= List of Wikipedias =

Most popular edition of Wikipedia by country as of December 2022. In grayed-out countries, a local language edition is usually the most popular.

Wikipedia is a free multilingual wiki-based open-source online encyclopedia edited and maintained by a community of volunteer editors, started on 15 January 2001 as an English-language encyclopedia. Non-English editions followed in the same year: the German and Catalan editions were created on 16 March, the French edition was created on 23 March, and the Swedish edition was created on 23 May. As of November 2026, Wikipedia articles have been created in 364 editions, with 348 currently active, 16 closed and 11 moved to Wikimedia Incubator.

The Meta-Wiki language committee manages policies on creating new Wikimedia projects. To be eligible, a language must have a valid ISO 639 code, be "sufficiently unique", and have a "sufficient number of fluent users".

== Variations in editions ==
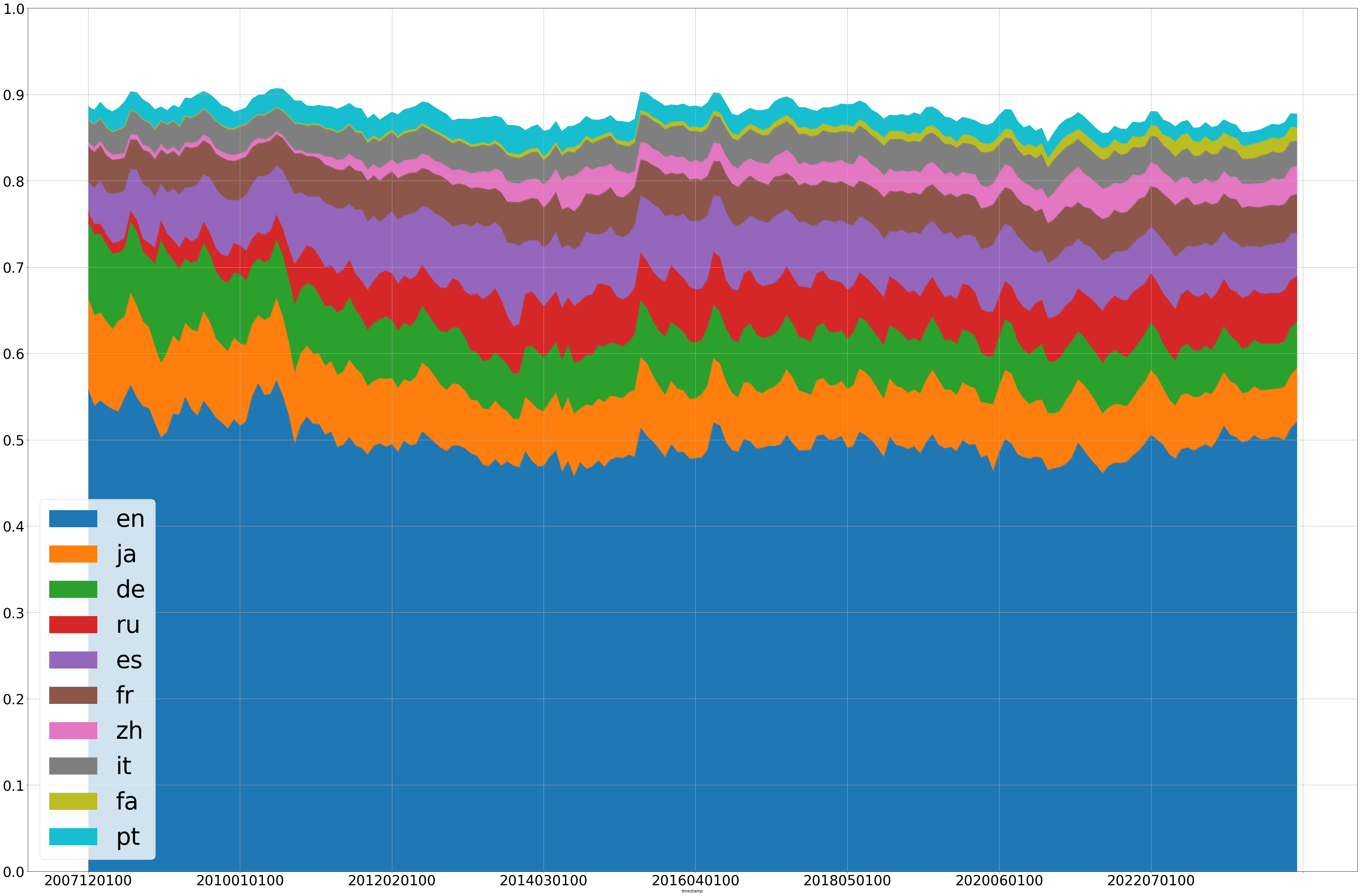
Most viewed editions of Wikipedia over time

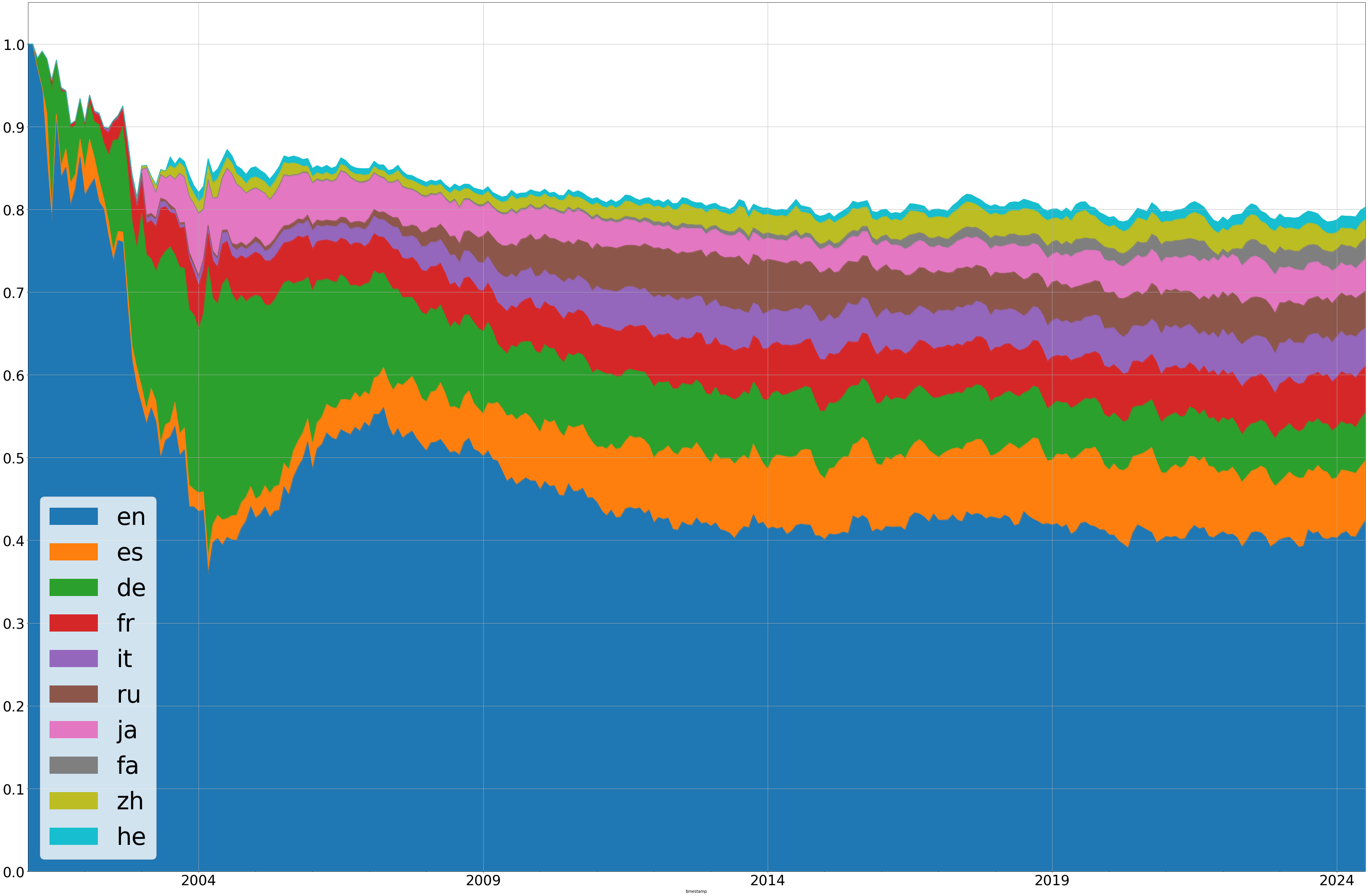
Most edited editions of Wikipedia over time

Wikipedia projects vary in how they divide dialects and variants. For example, the English Wikipedia includes most modern varieties of English including American English and British English. Similarly, the Catalan Wikipedia encompasses all Catalan variants, such as Valencian, Balearic, or France's Catalan; Spanish Wikipedia includes both Peninsular Spanish and Latin American Spanish; and the Portuguese Wikipedia includes both European Portuguese and Brazilian Portuguese. In contrast, some languages have multiple Wikipedias. For example, Serbo-Croatian encompasses four Wikipedia editions: Serbo-Croatian and three different standardized varieties (Bosnian, Croatian, and Serbian).

Additionally, some Wikipedia projects apply different approaches to orthography. For instance, the Chinese Wikipedia automatically transliterates between six standard forms: three using simplified Chinese characters (Mainland China, Malaysia, and Singapore) and three using traditional Chinese characters (Taiwan, Hong Kong, and Macau). And rather than relying on transliteration, Belarusian has separate Wikipedia projects for the official Narkamaŭka and Taraškievica orthographies.

== Wikipedia edition codes ==
Each Wikipedia project has a code, which is used as a subdomain of wikipedia.org. The codes mostly conform to ISO 639-1 two-letter codes or ISO 639-2/ISO 639-3 three-letter codes, with preference given to a two-letter code if available. For example, en stands for English in ISO 639-1, so the English Wikipedia is at en.wikipedia.org. There are also some Wikimedia-specific original creations like simple (for the Simple English Wikipedia) or be-tarask (for the Belarusian Wikipedia).

== Wikipedia editions ==
=== Active Wikipedias ===
The table below lists all the language editions of Wikipedia sorted by the date of launch.

Wikipedia editions
Wikipedia name in English	Wikipedia name in native language	Language	Script (ISO 15924 code)	Wikipedia code (linked to wp-main page)	Articles	Active users	Launch date	Logo	New WPs per year
English Wikipedia	English Wikipedia	English	Latn	en	7,266,054	261,656	15 Jan 2001	Wikipedia logo displaying the name "Wikipedia" and its slogan: "The Free Encyclopedia" below it, in English	2001 +17
Catalan Wikipedia	Viquipèdia en català	Catalan	Latn	ca	808,304	2,171	16 Mar 2001	Wikipedia logo displaying the name "Wikipedia" and its slogan: "The Free Encyclopedia" below it, in Catalan	2001 +17
German Wikipedia	Deutschsprachige Wikipedia	German	Latn	de	3,167,133	33,705	16 Mar 2001	Wikipedia logo displaying the name "Wikipedia" and its slogan: "The Free Encyclopedia" below it, in German	2001 +17
French Wikipedia	Wikipédia en français	French	Latn	fr	2,790,135	35,925	23 Mar 2001	Wikipedia logo displaying the name "Wikipedia" and its slogan: "The Free Encyclopedia" below it, in French	2001 +17
Italian Wikipedia	Wikipedia in italiano	Italian	Latn	it	1,996,230	25,000	11 May 2001	Wikipedia logo displaying the name "Wikipedia" and its slogan: "The Free Encyclopedia" below it, in Italian	2001 +17
Portuguese Wikipedia	Wikipédia em português	Portuguese	Latn	pt	1,189,453	7,321	11 May 2001	Wikipedia logo displaying the name "Wikipedia" and its slogan: "The Free Encyclopedia" below it, in Portuguese	2001 +17
Japanese Wikipedia	ウィキペディア日本語版 (Wikipedia nihongo-ban)	Japanese	Jpan	ja	1,528,342	22,776	20 May 2001	Wikipedia logo displaying the name "Wikipedia" and its slogan: "The Free Encyclopedia" below it, in Japanese	2001 +17
Russian Wikipedia	Русская Википедия (Russkaja Vikipedija)	Russian	Cyrl	ru	2,129,976	17,135	20 May 2001	Wikipedia logo displaying the name "Wikipedia" and its slogan: "The Free Encyclopedia" below it, in Russian	2001 +17
Spanish Wikipedia	Wikipedia en español	Spanish	Latn	es	2,150,614	37,688	20 May 2001	Wikipedia logo displaying the name "Wikipedia" and its slogan: "The Free Encyclopedia" below it, in Spanish	2001 +17
Swedish Wikipedia	Svenskspråkiga Wikipedia	Swedish	Latn	sv	2,630,607	4,484	23 May 2001	Wikipedia logo displaying the name "Wikipedia" and its slogan: "The Free Encyclopedia" below it, in Swedish	2001 +17
Dutch Wikipedia	Nederlandstalige Wikipedia	Dutch	Latn	nl	2,232,166	7,922	19 Jun 2001	Wikipedia logo displaying the name "Wikipedia" and its slogan: "The Free Encyclopedia" below it, in Dutch	2001 +17
Polish Wikipedia	Polskojęzyczna Wikipedia	Polish	Latn	pl	1,714,998	9,254	26 Jun 2001	Wikipedia logo displaying the name "Wikipedia" and its slogan: "The Free Encyclopedia" below it, in Polish	2001 +17
Simple English Wikipedia	Simple English Wikipedia	Simple English	Latn	simple	286,802	3,421	18 Sep 2001	Wikipedia logo displaying the words "Simple English" in italics and the name "Wikipedia" below them, in English	2001 +17
Esperanto Wikipedia	Vikipedio en Esperanto	Esperanto	Latn	eo	390,869	406	6 Nov 2001	Wikipedia logo displaying the name "Wikipedia" and its slogan: "The Free Encyclopedia" below it, in Esperanto	2001 +17
Afrikaans Wikipedia	Afrikaanse Wikipedia	Afrikaans	Latn	af	145,001	271	16 Nov 2001	Wikipedia logo displaying the name "Wikipedia" and its slogan: "The Free Encyclopedia" below it, in Afrikaans	2001 +17
Norwegian Wikipedia (Bokmål)	Norsk Wikipedia	Norwegian (Bokmål)	Latn	no	695,424	2,166	26 Nov 2001	Wikipedia logo displaying the name "Wikipedia" and its slogan: "The Free Encyclopedia" below it, in Norwegian (Bokmål)	2001 +17
Basque Wikipedia	Euskarazko Wikipedia	Basque	Latn	eu	501,072	926	6 Dec 2001	Wikipedia logo displaying the name "Wikipedia" and its slogan: "The Free Encyclopedia" below it, in Basque	2001 +17
Serbo-Croatian Wikipedia	Wikipedija na srpskohrvatskom jeziku (Википедија на српскохрватском језику)	Serbo-Croatian	Latn/ Cyrl	sh	462,027	282	16 Jan 2002 – 20 Feb 2005 (original); 23 Jun 2005 (relaunch)	Wikipedia logo displaying the name "Wikipedia" and its slogan: "The Free Encyclopedia" below it, in Serbo-Croatian	2002 +24
Danish Wikipedia	Dansk Wikipedia	Danish	Latn	da	316,773	1,530	1 Feb 2002	Wikipedia logo displaying the name "Wikipedia" and its slogan: "The Free Encyclopedia" below it, in Danish	2002 +24
Finnish Wikipedia	Suomenkielinen Wikipedia	Finnish	Latn	fi	628,712	3,335	21 Feb 2002	Wikipedia logo displaying the name "Wikipedia" and its slogan: "The Free Encyclopedia" below it, in Finnish	2002 +24
Slovene Wikipedia	Slovenska Wikipedija	Slovene	Latn	sl	199,671	639	26 Feb 2002	Wikipedia logo displaying the name "Wikipedia" and its slogan: "The Free Encyclopedia" below it, in Slovene	2002 +24
Interlingua Wikipedia	Wikipedia in interlingua	Interlingua	Latn	ia	30,487	53	29 Apr 2002	Wikipedia logo displaying the name "Wikipedia" and its slogan: "The Free Encyclopedia" below it, in Interlingua	2002 +24
Latin Wikipedia	Vicipaedia Latina	Latin	Latn	la	142,731	201	May 2002	Wikipedia logo displaying the name "Wikipedia" and its slogan: "The Free Encyclopedia" below it, in Latin	2002 +24
Czech Wikipedia	Česká Wikipedie	Czech	Latn	cs	602,059	4,578	3 May 2002	Wikipedia logo displaying the name "Wikipedia" and its slogan: "The Free Encyclopedia" below it, in Czech	2002 +24
Odia Wikipedia	ଓଡ଼ିଆ ଉଇକିପିଡ଼ିଆ (Oṛiā uikipiṛiā)	Odia	Orya	or	21,218	55	Jun 2002	Wikipedia logo displaying the name "Wikipedia" and its slogan: "The Free Encyclopedia" below it, in Odia	2002 +24
Assamese Wikipedia	অসমীয়া ৱিকিপিডিয়া (Ôxômiya wikipidiya)	Assamese	Beng	as	26,146	156	2 Jun 2002	Wikipedia logo displaying the name "Wikipedia" and its slogan: "The Free Encyclopedia" below it, in Assamese	2002 +24
Kazakh Wikipedia	Қазақша Уикипедия (Qazaqşa Wïkïpedïya) (قازاقشا ۋىيكىيپەدىييا)	Kazakh	Cyrl	kk	246,139	462	3 Jun 2002	Wikipedia logo displaying the name "Wikipedia" and its slogan: "The Free Encyclopedia" below it, in Kazakh	2002 +24
Kyrgyz Wikipedia	Кыргыз Википедиясы (Kyrgyz Wikipediyasy)	Kyrgyz	Cyrl	ky	76,718	328	3 Jun 2002	Wikipedia logo displaying the name "Wikipedia" and its slogan: "The Free Encyclopedia" below it, in Kyrgyz	2002 +24
Nepali Wikipedia	नेपाली विकिपिडिया (Nepālī vikipiḍiyā)	Nepali	Deva	ne	30,087	149	3 Jun 2002	Wikipedia logo displaying the name "Wikipedia" and its slogan: "The Free Encyclopedia" below it, in Nepali	2002 +24
Punjabi Wikipedia	ਪੰਜਾਬੀ ਵਿਕੀਪੀਡੀਆ (Pañjābī vikīpīḍīā)	Punjabi	Guru	pa	59,758	123	3 Jun 2002	Wikipedia logo displaying the name "Wikipedia" and its slogan: "The Free Encyclopedia" below it, in Punjabi	2002 +24
Estonian Wikipedia	Eestikeelne Vikipeedia	Estonian	Latn	et	263,029	1,011	24 Aug 2002	Wikipedia logo displaying the name "Wikipedia" and its slogan: "The Free Encyclopedia" below it, in Estonian	2002 +24
West Frisian Wikipedia	Frysktalige Wikipedy	West Frisian	Latn	fy	61,313	86	2 Sep 2002	Wikipedia logo displaying the name "Wikipedia" and its slogan: "The Free Encyclopedia" below it, in West Frisian	2002 +24
Korean Wikipedia	한국어 위키백과 (Hangugeo wikibaekgwa)	Korean	Hang	ko	774,553	4,989	11 Oct 2002	Wikipedia logo displaying the name "Wikipedia" and its slogan: "The Free Encyclopedia" below it, in Korean	2002 +24
Chinese Wikipedia	Traditional Chinese: 中文維基百科, simplified Chinese: 中文维基百科 (pinyin: Zhōngwén wéijī bǎikē)	Chinese (written vernacular Chinese)	Hans/ Hant	zh	1,566,658	13,257	24 Oct 2002	Wikipedia logo displaying the name "Wikipedia" and its slogan: "The Free Encyclopedia" below it, in Chinese	2002 +24
Malay Wikipedia	Wikipedia Bahasa Melayu (ويکيڤيديا بهاس ملايو)	Malay	Latn	ms	445,521	1,803	26 Oct 2002	Wikipedia logo displaying the name "Wikipedia" and its slogan: "The Free Encyclopedia" below it, in Malay	2002 +24
Vietnamese Wikipedia	Wikipedia tiếng Việt	Vietnamese	Latn	vi	1,306,070	4,150	Nov 2002	Wikipedia logo displaying the name "Wikipedia" and its slogan: "The Free Encyclopedia" below it, in Vietnamese	2002 +24
Amharic Wikipedia	አማርኛ ዊኪፔዲያ (Amarəñña wikipediya)	Amharic	Ethi	am	15,747	64	Dec 2002	Wikipedia logo displaying the name "Wikipedia" and its slogan: "The Free Encyclopedia" below it, in Amharic	2002 +24
Greek Wikipedia	Ελληνική Βικιπαίδεια (Ellinikí Vikipaídeia)	Greek	Grek	el	275,380	1,971	1 Dec 2002	Wikipedia logo displaying the name "Wikipedia" and its slogan: "The Free Encyclopedia" below it, in Greek	2002 +24
Turkish Wikipedia	Türkçe Vikipedi	Turkish	Latn	tr	710,908	3,922	5 Dec 2002	Wikipedia logo displaying the name "Wikipedia" and its slogan: "The Free Encyclopedia" below it, in Turkish	2002 +24
Bosnian Wikipedia	Wikipedia na bosanskom jeziku	Bosnian	Latn	bs	99,105	271	12 Dec 2002	Wikipedia logo displaying the name "Wikipedia" and its slogan: "The Free Encyclopedia" below it, in Bosnian	2002 +24
Malayalam Wikipedia	മലയാളം വിക്കിപീഡിയ (Malayāḷaṃ vikkipīḍiya)	Malayalam	Mlym	ml	89,432	375	21 Dec 2002	Wikipedia logo displaying the name "Wikipedia" and its slogan: "The Free Encyclopedia" below it, in Malayalam	2002 +24
Māori Wikipedia	Wikipedia Māori	Māori	Latn	mi	8,070	15	2003	Wikipedia logo displaying the name "Wikipedia" and its slogan: "The Free Encyclopedia" below it, in Māori	2003 +42
Pashto Wikipedia	پښتو ويکيپېډيا (Pax̌tó wīkīpeḍyā)	Pashto	Arab	ps	77,285	40,154	2003	Wikipedia logo displaying the name "Wikipedia" and its slogan: "The Free Encyclopedia" below it, in Pashto	2003 +42
Zulu Wikipedia	Wikipedia isiZulu	Zulu	Latn	zu	13,017	47	2003	Wikipedia logo displaying the name "Wikipedia" and its slogan: "The Free Encyclopedia" below it, in Zulu	2003 +42
Quechua Wikipedia	Qhichwa Wikipidiya	Quechua (Southern Quechua)	Latn	qu	24,684	54	Jan 2003	Wikipedia logo displaying the name "Wikipedia" and its slogan: "The Free Encyclopedia" below it, in Southern Quechua	2003 +42
Croatian Wikipedia	Hrvatska Wikipedija	Croatian	Latn	hr	236,666	1,035	16 Feb 2003	Wikipedia logo displaying the name "Wikipedia" and its slogan: "The Free Encyclopedia" below it, in Croatian	2003 +42
Serbian Wikipedia	Википедија на српском језику (Vikipedija na srpskom jeziku)	Serbian	Cyrl/ Latn	sr	711,232	1,542	16 Feb 2003	Wikipedia logo displaying the name "Wikipedia" and its slogan: "The Free Encyclopedia" below it, in Serbian	2003 +42
Lithuanian Wikipedia	Lietuviškoji Vikipedija	Lithuanian	Latn	lt	227,273	605	20 Feb 2003	Wikipedia logo displaying the name "Wikipedia" and its slogan: "The Free Encyclopedia" below it, in Lithuanian	2003 +42
Bhojpuri Wikipedia	भोजपुरी विकिपीडिया (Bhojapurī vikipīḍiyā)	Bhojpuri	Deva	bh	9,456	30	21 Feb 2003	Wikipedia logo displaying the name "Wikipedia" and its slogan: "The Free Encyclopedia" below it, in Bhojpuri	2003 +42
Latvian Wikipedia	Vikipēdija latviešu valodā	Latvian	Latn	lv	147,082	554	3 Mar 2003	Wikipedia logo displaying the name "Wikipedia" and its slogan: "The Free Encyclopedia" below it, in Latvian	2003 +42
Galician Wikipedia	Galipedia or Wikipedia en galego	Galician	Latn	gl	249,276	428	8 Mar 2003	Wikipedia logo displaying the name "Wikipedia" and its slogan: "The Free Encyclopedia" below it, in Galician	2003 +42
Swahili Wikipedia	Wikipedia ya Kiswahili	Swahili	Latn	sw	134,400	203	8 Mar 2003	Wikipedia logo displaying the name "Wikipedia" and its slogan: "The Free Encyclopedia" below it, in Swahili	2003 +42
Indonesian Wikipedia	Wikipedia bahasa Indonesia	Indonesian	Latn	id	805,061	4,614	30 Mar 2003	Wikipedia logo displaying the name "Wikipedia" and its slogan: "The Free Encyclopedia" below it, in Indonesian	2003 +42
Marathi Wikipedia	मराठी विकिपीडिया (Marāṭhī vikipīḍiyā)	Marathi	Deva	mr	104,295	286	1 May 2003	Wikipedia logo displaying the name "Wikipedia" and its slogan: "The Free Encyclopedia" below it, in Marathi	2003 +42
Kannada Wikipedia	ಕನ್ನಡ ವಿಕಿಪೀಡಿಯ (Kannaḍa vikipīḍiya)	Kannada	Knda	kn	34,975	229	Jun 2003	Wikipedia logo displaying the name "Wikipedia" and its slogan: "The Free Encyclopedia" below it, in Kannada	2003 +42
Welsh Wikipedia	Wicipedia Cymraeg	Welsh	Latn	cy	284,886	152	Jul 2003	Wikipedia logo displaying the name "Wikipedia" and its slogan: "The Free Encyclopedia" below it, in Welsh	2003 +42
Arabic Wikipedia	ويكيبيديا العربية (Wīkībīdiyā al-ʿarabiyya)	Arabic	Arab	ar	1,339,946	5,305	8 Jul 2003	Wikipedia logo displaying the name "Wikipedia" and its slogan: "The Free Encyclopedia" below it, in Arabic	2003 +42
Hebrew Wikipedia	ויקיפדיה העברית (Vikipedya ha-ivrit)	Hebrew	Hebr	he	409,004	6,258	8 Jul 2003	Wikipedia logo displaying the name "Wikipedia" and its slogan: "The Free Encyclopedia" below it, in Hebrew	2003 +42
Hungarian Wikipedia	Magyar Wikipédia	Hungarian	Latn	hu	576,396	2,798	8 Jul 2003	Wikipedia logo displaying the name "Wikipedia" and its slogan: "The Free Encyclopedia" below it, in Hungarian	2003 +42
Hindi Wikipedia	हिन्दी विकिपीडिया (Hindī vikipīḍiyā)	Hindi	Deva	hi	172,392	842	11 Jul 2003	Wikipedia logo displaying the name "Wikipedia" and its slogan: "The Free Encyclopedia" below it, in Hindi	2003 +42
Romanian Wikipedia	Wikipedia în limba română	Romanian	Latn	ro	550,664	1,831	12 Jul 2003	Wikipedia logo displaying the name "Wikipedia" and its slogan: "The Free Encyclopedia" below it, in Romanian	2003 +42
Walloon Wikipedia	Wikipedia e walon	Walloon	Latn	wa	13,050	31	20 Jul 2003	Wikipedia logo displaying the name "Wikipedia" and its slogan: "The Free Encyclopedia" below it, in Walloon	2003 +42
Nahuatl Wikipedia	Huiquipedia nāhuatlahtōlcopa	Nahuatl	Latn	nah	1,427	17	Aug 2003	Wikipedia logo displaying the name "Wikipedia" and its slogan: "The Free Encyclopedia" below it, in Nahuatl	2003 +42
Slovak Wikipedia	Slovenská Wikipedia	Slovak	Latn	sk	262,351	1,212	Aug 2003	Wikipedia logo displaying the name "Wikipedia" and its slogan: "The Free Encyclopedia" below it, in Slovak	2003 +42
Macedonian Wikipedia	Македонска Википедија (Makedonska Vikipedija)	Macedonian	Cyrl	mk	166,622	320	Sep 2003	Wikipedia logo displaying the name "Wikipedia" and its slogan: "The Free Encyclopedia" below it, in Macedonian	2003 +42
Manx Wikipedia	Wikipedia yn Gaelg	Manx	Latn	gv	7,145	24	Sep 2003	Wikipedia logo displaying the name "Wikipedia" and its slogan: "The Free Encyclopedia" below it, in Manx	2003 +42
Scottish Gaelic Wikipedia	Uicipeid na Gàidhlig	Scottish Gaelic	Latn	gd	15,956	19	Sep 2003	Wikipedia logo displaying the name "Wikipedia" and its slogan: "The Free Encyclopedia" below it, in Scottish Gaelic	2003 +42
Tamil Wikipedia	தமிழ் விக்கிபீடியா (Tamiḻ vikkippīṭiyā)	Tamil	Taml	ta	192,151	364	Sep 2003	Wikipedia logo displaying the name "Wikipedia" and its slogan: "The Free Encyclopedia" below it, in Tamil	2003 +42
Tatar Wikipedia	Татар Википедиясе (Tatar Wikipediäse)	Tatar	Cyrl	tt	709,331	113	15 Sep 2003	Wikipedia logo displaying the name "Wikipedia" and its slogan: "The Free Encyclopedia" below it, in Tatar	2003 +42
Irish Wikipedia	Vicipéid na Gaeilge	Irish	Latn	ga	64,639	109	Oct 2003	Wikipedia logo displaying the name "Wikipedia" and its slogan: "The Free Encyclopedia" below it, in Irish	2003 +42
Albanian Wikipedia	Wikipedia shqip	Albanian	Latn	sq	106,294	401	12 Oct 2003	Wikipedia logo displaying the name "Wikipedia" and its slogan: "The Free Encyclopedia" below it, in Albanian	2003 +42
Occitan Wikipedia	Wikipèdia en occitan	Occitan	Latn	oc	91,059	109	20 Oct 2003	Wikipedia logo displaying the name "Wikipedia" and its slogan: "The Free Encyclopedia" below it, in Occitan	2003 +42
Georgian Wikipedia	ქართული ვიკიპედია (Kartuli vik’ip’edia)	Georgian	Geor	ka	201,906	432	Nov 2003	Wikipedia logo displaying the name "Wikipedia" and its slogan: "The Free Encyclopedia" below it, in Georgian	2003 +42
Alemannic Wikipedia	Alemannische Wikipedia	Alemannic German	Latn	als	31,872	104	13 Nov 2003	Wikipedia logo displaying the name "Wikipedia" and its slogan: "The Free Encyclopedia" below it, in Alemannic	2003 +42
Sanskrit Wikipedia	संस्कृतविकिपीडिया (Saṃskṛta vikipīḍiyā)	Sanskrit	Deva	sa	12,589	82	Dec 2003	Wikipedia logo displaying the name "Wikipedia" and its slogan: "The Free Encyclopedia" below it, in Sanskrit	2003 +42
Thai Wikipedia	วิกิพีเดียภาษาไทย (Wi-ki-phi-dia pha-sa thai)	Thai	Thai	th	189,931	2,441	Dec 2003	Wikipedia logo displaying the name "Wikipedia" and its slogan: "The Free Encyclopedia" below it, in Thai	2003 +42
Tagalog Wikipedia	Wikipediang Tagalog	Tagalog	Latn	tl	50,845	299	1 Dec 2003	Wikipedia logo displaying the name "Wikipedia" and its slogan: "The Free Encyclopedia" below it, in Tagalog	2003 +42
Icelandic Wikipedia	Íslenska Wikipedia	Icelandic	Latn	is	60,623	228	5 Dec 2003	Wikipedia logo displaying the name "Wikipedia" and its slogan: "The Free Encyclopedia" below it, in Icelandic	2003 +42
Bulgarian Wikipedia	Българоезична Уикипедия (Bǎlgaroezična Uikipedija)	Bulgarian	Cyrl	bg	313,212	1,774	6 Dec 2003	Wikipedia logo displaying the name "Wikipedia" and its slogan: "The Free Encyclopedia" below it, in Bulgarian	2003 +42
Corsican Wikipedia	Corsipedia or Wikipedia in lingua corsa	Corsican	Latn	co	9,637	28	9 Dec 2003	Wikipedia logo displaying the name "Wikipedia" and its slogan: "The Free Encyclopedia" below it, in Corsican	2003 +42
Telugu Wikipedia	తెలుగు వికీపీడియా (Telugu vikīpīḍiyā)	Telugu	Telu	te	131,139	326	10 Dec 2003	Wikipedia logo displaying the name "Wikipedia" and its slogan: "The Free Encyclopedia" below it, in Telugu	2003 +42
Persian Wikipedia	ویکی‌پدیای فارسی (Vikipediā-ye Fārsi)	Persian	Arab	fa	1,104,125	8,318	19 Dec 2003	Wikipedia logo displaying the name "Wikipedia" and its slogan: "The Free Encyclopedia" below it, in Persian	2003 +42
Uzbek Wikipedia	Oʻzbekcha Vikipediya (Ўзбекча Википедия)	Uzbek	Latn/ Cyrl	uz	373,673	683	21 Dec 2003	Wikipedia logo displaying the name "Wikipedia" and its slogan: "The Free Encyclopedia" below it, in Uzbek	2003 +42
Aromanian Wikipedia	Wikipedia pri Armâneaști	Aromanian	Latn	roa-rup	1,390	12	2004	Wikipedia logo displaying the name "Wikipedia" and its slogan: "The Free Encyclopedia" below it, in Aromanian	2004 +71
Ido Wikipedia	Wikipedio en Ido	Ido	Latn	io	65,855	61	2004	Wikipedia logo displaying the name "Wikipedia" and its slogan: "The Free Encyclopedia" below it, in Ido	2004 +71
Azerbaijani Wikipedia	Azərbaycanca Vikipediya	Azerbaijani	Latn	az	219,216	956	Jan 2004	Wikipedia logo displaying the name "Wikipedia" and its slogan: "The Free Encyclopedia" below it, in Azerbaijani	2004 +71
Tongan Wikipedia	Wikipedia ʻi lea fakatonga	Tongan	Latn	to	2,049	9	Jan 2004	Wikipedia logo displaying the name "Wikipedia" and its slogan: "The Free Encyclopedia" below it, in Tongan	2004 +71
Kurdish Wikipedia	Wîkîpediya kurdî (ویکیپەدیا کوردی)	Kurdish (Kurmanji)	Latn/ Arab	ku	92,400	96	4 Jan 2004	Wikipedia logo displaying the name "Wikipedia" and its slogan: "The Free Encyclopedia" below it, in Kurmanji Kurdish	2004 +71
Urdu Wikipedia	اردو ویکیپیڈیا (Urdū vikipīḍiyā)	Urdu	Arab	ur	711,893	429	24 Jan 2004	Wikipedia logo displaying the name "Wikipedia" and its slogan: "The Free Encyclopedia" below it, in Urdu	2004 +71
Bengali Wikipedia	বাংলা উইকিপিডিয়া (Bāṅlā uikipiḍiẏa)	Bengali	Beng	bn	192,668	1,766	27 Jan 2004	Wikipedia logo displaying the name "Wikipedia" and its slogan: "The Free Encyclopedia" below it, in Bengali	2004 +71
Tajik Wikipedia	Википедияи Тоҷикӣ (Vikipedijai Toçikī)	Tajik	Cyrl/ Latn	tg	119,644	137	27 Jan 2004	Wikipedia logo displaying the name "Wikipedia" and its slogan: "The Free Encyclopedia" below it, in Tajik	2004 +71
Volapük Wikipedia	Vükiped Volapükik	Volapük	Latn	vo	58,150	43	27 Jan 2004	Wikipedia logo displaying the name "Wikipedia" and its slogan: "The Free Encyclopedia" below it, in Volapük	2004 +71
Ukrainian Wikipedia	Українська Вікіпедія (Ukrajinska Vikipedija)	Ukrainian	Cyrl	uk	1,442,353	4,885	30 Jan 2004	Wikipedia logo displaying the name "Wikipedia" and its slogan: "The Free Encyclopedia" below it, in Ukrainian	2004 +71
Turkmen Wikipedia	Türkmençe Wikipediýa	Turkmen	Latn	tk	7,353	65	16 Feb 2004	Wikipedia logo displaying the name "Wikipedia" and its slogan: "The Free Encyclopedia" below it, in Turkmen	2004 +71
Mongolian Wikipedia	Монгол Википедиа (Mongol Vikipyedia)	Mongolian	Cyrl	mn	28,733	216	28 Feb 2004	Wikipedia logo displaying the name "Wikipedia" and its slogan: "The Free Encyclopedia" below it, in Mongolian	2004 +71
Sotho Wikipedia	Wikipedia Sesotho	Sotho	Latn	st	2,256	21	Mar 2004	Wikipedia logo displaying the name "Wikipedia" and its slogan: "The Free Encyclopedia" below it, in Sotho	2004 +71
Yiddish Wikipedia	יידישע וויקיפעדיע (Yidishe vikipedye)	Yiddish	Hebr	yi	15,850	56	4 Mar 2004	Wikipedia logo displaying the name "Wikipedia" and its slogan: "The Free Encyclopedia" below it, in Yiddish	2004 +71
Javanese Wikipedia	Wikipedia basa Jawa (ꦮꦶꦏꦶꦥꦺꦝꦶꦪꦃꦧꦱꦗꦮ)	Javanese	Latn/ Java	jv	75,645	104	8 Mar 2004	Wikipedia logo displaying the name "Wikipedia" and its slogan: "The Free Encyclopedia" below it, in Javanese	2004 +71
Sundanese Wikipedia	Wikipédia basa Sunda	Sundanese	Latn	su	63,036	54	15 Mar 2004	Wikipedia logo displaying the name "Wikipedia" and its slogan: "The Free Encyclopedia" below it, in Sundanese	2004 +71
Kashmiri Wikipedia	کٲشُر وِکیٖپیٖڈیا (Kạ̄śur vikipīḍiyā)	Kashmiri	Arab	ks	11,953	28	25 Mar 2004	Wikipedia logo displaying the name "Wikipedia" and its slogan: "The Free Encyclopedia" below it, in Kashmiri	2004 +71
Kashubian Wikipedia	Kaszëbskô Wikipedijô	Kashubian	Latn	csb	5,926	34	31 Mar 2004	Wikipedia logo displaying the name "Wikipedia" and its slogan: "The Free Encyclopedia" below it, in Kashubian	2004 +71
Malagasy Wikipedia	Wikipedia amin'ny teny malagasy	Malagasy	Latn	mg	104,396	83	Apr 2004	Wikipedia logo displaying the name "Wikipedia" and its slogan: "The Free Encyclopedia" below it, in Malagasy	2004 +71
Sardinian Wikipedia	Wikipedia in sardu	Sardinian	Latn	sc	7,860	24	Apr 2004	Wikipedia logo displaying the name "Wikipedia" and its slogan: "The Free Encyclopedia" below it, in Sardinian	2004 +71
Toki Pona Wikipedia	lipu Wikipesija pi toki pona	Toki Pona	Latn	tok	4,893	76	4 Apr 2004 – 16 Nov 2004 (closure; original), 24 Mar 2009 (deletion; original), 26 Nov 2025 (relaunch)	Wikipedia logo displaying the name "Wikipedia" and its slogan: "The Free Encyclopedia" below it, in Toki Pona	2004 +71
Cherokee Wikipedia	ᏫᎩᏇᏗᏯ ᏣᎳᎩ (Wigiquediya tsalagi)	Cherokee	Cher	chr	1,000	16	May 2004	Wikipedia logo displaying the name "Wikipedia" and its slogan: "The Free Encyclopedia" below it, in Cherokee	2004 +71
Romansh Wikipedia	Vichipedia rumantscha	Romansh	Latn	rm	3,903	38	May 2004	Wikipedia logo displaying the name "Wikipedia" and its slogan: "The Free Encyclopedia" below it, in Romansh	2004 +71
Southern Min Wikipedia	Traditional Chinese: 閩南語維基百科; Pe̍h-ōe-jī: Holopedia or Wikipedia Bân-lâm-gú	Southern Min	Latn/ Hant	zh-min-nan	434,709	108	28 May 2004	Wikipedia logo displaying the name "Wikipedia" and its slogan: "The Free Encyclopedia" below it, in Southern Min	2004 +71
Faroese Wikipedia	Føroysk Wikipedia	Faroese	Latn	fo	14,220	48	30 May 2004	Wikipedia logo displaying the name "Wikipedia" and its slogan: "The Free Encyclopedia" below it, in Faroese	2004 +71
Breton Wikipedia	Wikipedia e brezhoneg	Breton	Latn	br	92,023	128	Jun 2004	Wikipedia logo displaying the name "Wikipedia" and its slogan: "The Free Encyclopedia" below it, in Breton	2004 +71
Bislama Wikipedia	Wikipedia long Bislama	Bislama	Latn	bi	1,518	8	Jun 2004	Wikipedia logo displaying the name "Wikipedia" and its slogan: "The Free Encyclopedia" below it, in Bislama	2004 +71
Tok Pisin Wikipedia	Wikipedia long Tok Pisin	Tok Pisin	Latn	tpi	1,417	8	Jun 2004	Wikipedia logo displaying the name "Wikipedia" and its slogan: "The Free Encyclopedia" below it, in Tok Pisin	2004 +71
Oromo Wikipedia	Oromoo Wikipedia	Oromo	Latn	om	1,972	32	Jun 2004	Wikipedia logo displaying the name "Wikipedia" and its slogan: "The Free Encyclopedia" below it, in Oromo	2004 +71
Classical Syriac Wikipedia	ܘܝܩܝܦܕܝܐ ܠܫܢܐ ܣܘܪܝܝܐ (Wīqīpedyāʾ leššānā suryāyā)	Aramaic (Syriac)	Syrc	arc	1,920	14	Jul 2004	Wikipedia logo displaying the name "Wikipedia" and its slogan: "The Free Encyclopedia" below it, in Aramaic	2004 +71
Armenian Wikipedia	Հայերեն Վիքիպեդիա (Hayeren Vikʿipedia)	Armenian	Armn	hy	333,360	590	Jul 2004	Wikipedia logo displaying the name "Wikipedia" and its slogan: "The Free Encyclopedia" below it, in Armenian	2004 +71
Burmese Wikipedia	မြန်မာဝီကီပီးဒီးယား (Mranma wikipi:di:ya:)	Burmese	Mymr	my	113,508	231	Jul 2004	Wikipedia logo displaying the name "Wikipedia" and its slogan: "The Free Encyclopedia" below it, in Burmese	2004 +71
Gujarati Wikipedia	ગુજરાતી વિકિપીડિયા (Gujrātī vikipīḍiyā)	Gujarati	Gujr	gu	30,941	75	Jul 2004	Wikipedia logo displaying the name "Wikipedia" and its slogan: "The Free Encyclopedia" below it, in Gujarati	2004 +71
Asturian Wikipedia	Wikipedia n'asturianu	Asturian	Latn	ast	141,747	160	20 Jul 2004	Wikipedia logo displaying the name "Wikipedia" and its slogan: "The Free Encyclopedia" below it, in Asturian	2004 +71
Northern Sámi Wikipedia	Davvisámegiel Wikipedia	Northern Sámi	Latn	se	7,923	31	20 Jul 2004	Wikipedia logo displaying the name "Wikipedia" and its slogan: "The Free Encyclopedia" below it, in Northern Sámi	2004 +71
Aragonese Wikipedia	Biquipedia en aragonés	Aragonese	Latn	an	88,839	90	21 Jul 2004	Wikipedia logo displaying the name "Wikipedia" and its slogan: "The Free Encyclopedia" below it, in Aragonese	2004 +71
Luxembourgish Wikipedia	Wikipedia op Lëtzebuergesch	Luxembourgish	Latn	lb	68,209	121	21 Jul 2004	Wikipedia logo displaying the name "Wikipedia" and its slogan: "The Free Encyclopedia" below it, in Luxembourgish	2004 +71
Norwegian Wikipedia (Nynorsk)	Norsk (Nynorsk) Wikipedia	Norwegian (Nynorsk)	Latn	nn	181,463	202	31 Jul 2004	Wikipedia logo displaying the name "Wikipedia" and its slogan: "The Free Encyclopedia" below it, in Norwegian (Nynorsk)	2004 +71
Komi Wikipedia	Коми Википедия (Komi Vikipedija)	Komi	Cyrl	kv	5,832	15	Aug 2004	Wikipedia logo displaying the name "Wikipedia" and its slogan: "The Free Encyclopedia" below it, in Komi	2004 +71
Limburgish Wikipedia	Limburgse Wikipedia	Limburgish	Latn	li	15,223	31	Aug 2004	Wikipedia logo displaying the name "Wikipedia" and its slogan: "The Free Encyclopedia" below it, in Limburgish	2004 +71
Xhosa Wikipedia	Wikipedia isiXhosa	Xhosa	Latn	xh	2,604	15	Aug 2004	Wikipedia logo displaying the name "Wikipedia" and its slogan: "The Free Encyclopedia" below it, in Xhosa	2004 +71
Uyghur Wikipedia	UEY: ئۇيغۇرچە ۋىكىپېدىيە (ULY: Uyghur wikipëdiye) (UYY: Uyghur vikipediyə) (UKY: Уйғур википедийә)	Uyghur	Arab	ug	9,765	26	Aug 2004	Wikipedia logo displaying the name "Wikipedia" and its slogan: "The Free Encyclopedia" below it, in Uyghur	2004 +71
Shona Wikipedia	Wikipedhiya chiShona	Shona	Latn	sn	11,897	12	Aug 2004	Wikipedia logo displaying the name "Wikipedia" and its slogan: "The Free Encyclopedia" below it, in Shona	2004 +71
Chamorro Wikipedia	Wikipedia Chamoru	Chamorro	Latn	ch	581	17	Aug 2004	Wikipedia logo displaying the name "Wikipedia" and its slogan: "The Free Encyclopedia" below it, in Chamorro	2004 +71
Interlingue Wikipedia	Wikipedia in Interlingue	Interlingue	Latn	ie	13,850	29	Aug 2004	Wikipedia logo displaying the name "Wikipedia" and its slogan: "The Free Encyclopedia" below it, in Interlingue	2004 +71
Lojban Wikipedia	ni'o la .uikipedi'as. pe lo jbobau	Lojban	Latn	jbo	1,380	36	Aug 2004	Wikipedia logo displaying the name "Wikipedia" and its slogan: "The Free Encyclopedia" below it, in Lojban	2004 +71
Tsonga Wikipedia	Wikipediya Xitsonga	Tsonga	Latn	ts	1,329	9	Aug 2004	Wikipedia logo displaying the name "Wikipedia" and its slogan: "The Free Encyclopedia" below it, in Tsonga	2004 +71
Belarusian Wikipedia (Classical)	Беларуская Вікіпэдыя (Bielaruskaja Vikipiedyja)	Belarusian (Taraškievica orthography)	Cyrl	be-tarask	91,569	166	12 Aug 2004	Wikipedia logo displaying the name "Wikipedia" and its slogan: "The Free Encyclopedia" below it, in Belarusian (Classical orthography)	2004 +71
Maldivian Wikipedia	ދިވެހި ވިކިޕީޑިޔާ (Dhivehi vikipīḍiyā)	Maldivian	Thaa	dv	3,235	15	28 Aug 2004	Wikipedia logo displaying the name "Wikipedia" and its slogan: "The Free Encyclopedia" below it, in Maldivian	2004 +71
Lao Wikipedia	ວິກິພີເດຍ ພາສາລາວ (Wi ki phī dīa phasa lao)	Lao	Laoo	lo	5,674	45	Sep 2004	Wikipedia logo displaying the name "Wikipedia" and its slogan: "The Free Encyclopedia" below it, in Lao	2004 +71
Twi Wikipedia	Wikipidia Twi	Twi	Latn	tw	4,749	24	Sep 2004	Wikipedia logo displaying the name "Wikipedia" and its slogan: "The Free Encyclopedia" below it, in Twi	2004 +71
Aymara Wikipedia	Aymar Wikipidiya	Aymara	Latn	ay	5,302	23	Sep 2004	Wikipedia logo displaying the name "Wikipedia" and its slogan: "The Free Encyclopedia" below it, in Aymara	2004 +71
Tswana Wikipedia	Wikipedia Setswana	Tswana	Latn	tn	6,133	25	Sep 2004	Wikipedia logo displaying the name "Wikipedia" and its slogan: "The Free Encyclopedia" below it, in Tswana	2004 +71
Navajo Wikipedia	Wikiibíídiiya Dinék'ehjí	Navajo	Latn	nv	22,668	7	Sep 2004	Wikipedia logo displaying the name "Wikipedia" and its slogan: "The Free Encyclopedia" below it, in Navajo	2004 +71
Somali Wikipedia	Soomaali Wikipedia	Somali	Latn	so	14,174	92	Sep 2004	Wikipedia logo displaying the name "Wikipedia" and its slogan: "The Free Encyclopedia" below it, in Somali	2004 +71
Iñupiaq Wikipedia	Uiqipitia Iñupiatun	Iñupiaq	Latn	ik	599	8	Sep 2004	Wikipedia logo displaying the name "Wikipedia" and its slogan: "The Free Encyclopedia" below it, in Iñupiaq	2004 +71
Fijian Wikipedia	Vaka-Viti Wikipedia	Fijian	Latn	fj	1,729	5	Sep 2004	Wikipedia logo displaying the name "Wikipedia" and its slogan: "The Free Encyclopedia" below it, in Fijian	2004 +71
Maltese Wikipedia	Wikipedija Malti	Maltese	Latn	mt	8,100	54	10 Sep 2004	Wikipedia logo displaying the name "Wikipedia" and its slogan: "The Free Encyclopedia" below it, in Maltese	2004 +71
Inuktitut Wikipedia	ᐃᓄᒃᑎᑐᑦ ᐊᕆᐅᙵᐃᐹ (Uikipitia inuktitut)	Inuktitut	Latn/ Cans	iu	427	33	Oct 2004	Wikipedia logo displaying the name "Wikipedia" and its slogan: "The Free Encyclopedia" below it, in Inuktitut	2004 +71
Swazi Wikipedia	Wikipedia siSwati	Swazi	Latn	ss	1,195	7	Oct 2004	Wikipedia logo displaying the name "Wikipedia" and its slogan: "The Free Encyclopedia" below it, in Swazi	2004 +71
Gothic Wikipedia	𐌲𐌿𐍄𐌹𐍃𐌺 𐍅𐌹𐌺𐌹𐍀𐌰𐌹𐌳𐌾𐌰 (Gutisk wikipaidja)	Gothic	Goth	got	1,037	19	Oct 2004	Wikipedia logo displaying the name "Wikipedia" and its slogan: "The Free Encyclopedia" below it, in Gothic	2004 +71
Old English Wikipedia	Engliscan Ƿikipǣdia	Old English	Latn	ang	5,369	72	Oct 2004	Wikipedia logo displaying the name "Wikipedia" and its slogan: "The Free Encyclopedia" below it, in Old English	2004 +71
Lingala Wikipedia	Lingála Wikipedia	Lingala	Latn	ln	5,335	26	Oct 2004	Wikipedia logo displaying the name "Wikipedia" and its slogan: "The Free Encyclopedia" below it, in Lingala	2004 +71
Avar Wikipedia	Авар Википедия (Avar Vikipedija)	Avar	Cyrl	av	4,046	23	Oct 2004	Wikipedia logo displaying the name "Wikipedia" and its slogan: "The Free Encyclopedia" below it, in Avar	2004 +71
Sicilian Wikipedia	Wikipedia ’n sicilianu	Sicilian	Latn	scn	26,369	37	5 Oct 2004	Wikipedia logo displaying the name "Wikipedia" and its slogan: "The Free Encyclopedia" below it, in Sicilian	2004 +71
Samoan Wikipedia	Wikipedia gagana Sāmoa	Samoan	Latn	sm	1,208	9	Nov 2004	Wikipedia logo displaying the name "Wikipedia" and its slogan: "The Free Encyclopedia" below it, in Samoan	2004 +71
Venda Wikipedia	Wikipedia nga tshiVenḓa	Venda	Latn	ve	929	9	Nov 2004	Wikipedia logo displaying the name "Wikipedia" and its slogan: "The Free Encyclopedia" below it, in Venda	2004 +71
Abkhaz Wikipedia	Аԥсуа авикипедиа (Apsua avikipedia)	Abkhaz	Cyrl	ab	6,753	24	Nov 2004	Wikipedia logo displaying the name "Wikipedia" and its slogan: "The Free Encyclopedia" below it, in Abkhaz	2004 +71
Kinyarwanda Wikipedia	Wikipediya mu Ikinyarwanda	Kinyarwanda	Latn	rw	11,270	63	Nov 2004	Wikipedia logo displaying the name "Wikipedia" and its slogan: "The Free Encyclopedia" below it, in English	2004 +71
Chuvash Wikipedia	Чăваш Википедийĕ (Russian-based: Căvaš Vikipedijĕ, Turkish-based: Çovaş Vikipyediyö)	Chuvash	Cyrl	cv	59,306	56	22 Nov 2004	Wikipedia logo displaying the name "Wikipedia" and its slogan: "The Free Encyclopedia" below it, in Chuvash	2004 +71
Tumbuka Wikipedia	Wikipedia Chitumbuka	Tumbuka	Latn	tum	19,846	25	Dec 2004	Wikipedia logo displaying the name "Wikipedia" and its slogan: "The Free Encyclopedia" below it, in Tumbuka	2004 +71
Bambara Wikipedia	Wikipedi Bamanankan	Bambara	Latn	bm	930	12	2005	Wikipedia logo displaying the name "Wikipedia" and its slogan: "The Free Encyclopedia" below it, in Bambara	2005 +35
Banyumasan Wikipedia	Wikipédia basa Banyumasan	Banyumasan	Latn	map-bms	13,982	16	2005	Wikipedia logo displaying the name "Wikipedia" and its slogan: "The Free Encyclopedia" below it, in Banyumasan	2005 +35
Guarani Wikipedia	Vikipetã avañe'ẽme	Guarani	Latn	gn	6,038	24	2005	Wikipedia logo displaying the name "Wikipedia" and its slogan: "The Free Encyclopedia" below it, in Guarani	2005 +35
Ilocano Wikipedia	Wikipedia nga Ilokano	Ilocano	Latn	ilo	15,528	23	2005	Wikipedia logo displaying the name "Wikipedia" and its slogan: "The Free Encyclopedia" below it, in Ilocano	2005 +35
Kapampangan Wikipedia	Wikipediang Kapampángan	Kapampangan	Latn	pam	10,222	21	2005	Wikipedia logo displaying the name "Wikipedia" and its slogan: "The Free Encyclopedia" below it, in Kapampangan	2005 +35
Venetian Wikipedia	Wikipedia en łéngoa vèneta	Venetian	Latn	vec	69,635	42	2005	Wikipedia logo displaying the name "Wikipedia" and its slogan: "The Free Encyclopedia" below it, in Venetian	2005 +35
Võro Wikipedia	Võrokeeline Vikipeediä	Võro	Latn	fiu-vro	6,942	31	2005	Wikipedia logo displaying the name "Wikipedia" and its slogan: "The Free Encyclopedia" below it, in Võro	2005 +35
Wolof Wikipedia	Wikipedia Wolof	Wolof	Latn	wo	1,736	15	2005	Wikipedia logo displaying the name "Wikipedia" and its slogan: "The Free Encyclopedia" below it, in Wolof	2005 +35
Pali Wikipedia	पालि विकिपीडिया (Pāli vikipīḍiyā)	Pali	Deva	pi	302	14	Jan 2005	Wikipedia logo displaying the name "Wikipedia" and its slogan: "The Free Encyclopedia" below it, in Pali	2005 +35
Hawaiian Wikipedia	Hawai‘i Wikipikia	Hawaiian	Latn	haw	2,901	24	Jan 2005	Wikipedia logo displaying the name "Wikipedia" and its slogan: "The Free Encyclopedia" below it, in Hawaiian	2005 +35
Tahitian Wikipedia	Vitipetia Reo Tahiti	Tahitian	Latn	ty	1,252	14	Jan 2005	Wikipedia logo displaying the name "Wikipedia" and its slogan: "The Free Encyclopedia" below it, in Tahitian	2005 +35
Khmer Wikipedia	វិគីភីឌាភាសាខ្មែរ (Vikiiphiidiaa phiăsaa khmae)	Khmer	Khmr	km	12,998	86	15 Jan 2005	Wikipedia logo displaying the name "Wikipedia" and its slogan: "The Free Encyclopedia" below it, in Khmer	2005 +35
Friulian Wikipedia	Vichipedie par furlan	Friulian	Latn	fur	6,077	20	25 Jan 2005	Wikipedia logo displaying the name "Wikipedia" and its slogan: "The Free Encyclopedia" below it, in Friulian	2005 +35
Chechen Wikipedia	Нохчийн Википеди (Noxçiyn Wikipedi)	Chechen	Cyrl	ce	874,451	86	28 Feb 2005	Wikipedia logo displaying the name "Wikipedia" and its slogan: "The Free Encyclopedia" below it, in Chechen	2005 +35
Ossetian Wikipedia	Ирон Википеди (Iron Vikipedi)	Ossetian	Cyrl	os	21,763	27	28 Feb 2005	Wikipedia logo displaying the name "Wikipedia" and its slogan: "The Free Encyclopedia" below it, in Ossetian	2005 +35
Ewe Wikipedia	Wikipiɖia Eʋegbe	Ewe	Latn	ee	1,437	21	Apr 2005	Wikipedia logo displaying the name "Wikipedia" and its slogan: "The Free Encyclopedia" below it, in Ewe	2005 +35
Bashkir Wikipedia	Башҡорт Википедияһы (Başķort Vikipediya)	Bashkir	Cyrl	ba	64,318	95	16 Apr 2005	Wikipedia logo displaying the name "Wikipedia" and its slogan: "The Free Encyclopedia" below it, in Bashkir	2005 +35
Cheyenne Wikipedia	Vekepete'a Tsėhésenėstsestȯtse	Cheyenne	Latn	chy	719	21	May 2005	Wikipedia logo displaying the name "Wikipedia" and its slogan: "The Free Encyclopedia" below it, in Cheyenne	2005 +35
Zhuang Wikipedia	Veizgiek Bakgoh Vahcuengh	Zhuang (Standard Zhuang)	Latn	za	3,030	12	Jun 2005	Wikipedia logo displaying the name "Wikipedia" and its slogan: "The Free Encyclopedia" below it, in Standard Zhuang	2005 +35
Fula Wikipedia	Wikipedia Fulfude	Fula	Latn	ff	22,818	30	Jun 2005	Wikipedia logo displaying the name "Wikipedia" and its slogan: "The Free Encyclopedia" below it, in Fula	2005 +35
Cebuano Wikipedia	Wikipedya sa Sinugboanon	Cebuano	Latn	ceb	6,116,386	197	22 Jun 2005	Wikipedia logo displaying the name "Wikipedia" and its slogan: "The Free Encyclopedia" below it, in Cebuano	2005 +35
Scots Wikipedia	Scots Wikipædia	Scots	Latn	sco	34,046	130	23 Jun 2005	Wikipedia logo displaying the name "Wikipedia" and its slogan: "The Free Encyclopedia" below it, in Scots	2005 +35
Sinhala Wikipedia	සිංහල විකිපීඩියා (Siṁhala wikipīḍiyā)	Sinhala	Sinh	si	25,930	150	Jul 2005	Wikipedia logo displaying the name "Wikipedia" and its slogan: "The Free Encyclopedia" below it, in Sinhala	2005 +35
Ripuarian Wikipedia	Wikkipedija en Ripoarisch Platt	Ripuarian	Latn	ksh	3,039	19	6 Jul 2005	Wikipedia logo displaying the name "Wikipedia" and its slogan: "The Free Encyclopedia" below it, in Ripuarian	2005 +35
Haitian Creole Wikipedia	Wikipedya kreyòl ayisyen	Haitian Creole	Latn	ht	72,145	88	Aug 2005	Wikipedia logo displaying the name "Wikipedia" and its slogan: "The Free Encyclopedia" below it, in Haitian Creole	2005 +35
Tigrinya Wikipedia	ዊኪፐድያ ብትግርኛ (Wikipädya bətəgrəñña)	Tigrinya	Ethi	ti	374	14	Aug 2005	Wikipedia logo displaying the name "Wikipedia" and its slogan: "The Free Encyclopedia" below it, in Tigrinya	2005 +35
Kikuyu Wikipedia	Wikipedia Gĩgĩkũyũ	Kikuyu	Latn	ki	2,987	13	Sep 2005	Wikipedia logo displaying the name "Wikipedia" and its slogan: "The Free Encyclopedia" below it, in Kikuyu	2005 +35
Waray Wikipedia	Waray Wikipedia	Waray	Latn	war	1,267,077	63	25 Sep 2005	Wikipedia logo displaying the name "Wikipedia" and its slogan: "The Free Encyclopedia" below it, in Waray	2005 +35
Lombard Wikipedia	Wikipedia in lombard	Lombard	Latn	lmo	80,398	52	Oct 2005	Wikipedia logo displaying the name "Wikipedia" and its slogan: "The Free Encyclopedia" below it, in Lombard	2005 +35
Chewa Wikipedia	Wikipedia Chichewa	Chewa	Latn	ny	1,167	19	Oct 2005	Wikipedia logo displaying the name "Wikipedia" and its slogan: "The Free Encyclopedia" below it, in Chewa	2005 +35
Judaeo-Spanish Wikipedia	Vikipedya en lingua Judeo-Espanyola	Judaeo-Spanish	Latn	lad	4,099	20	Oct 2005	Wikipedia logo displaying the name "Wikipedia" and its slogan: "The Free Encyclopedia" below it, in Judaeo-Spanish	2005 +35
Udmurt Wikipedia	Удмурт Википедия (Udmurt Vikipedija)	Udmurt	Cyrl	udm	5,918	20	24 Oct 2005	Wikipedia logo displaying the name "Wikipedia" and its slogan: "The Free Encyclopedia" below it, in Udmurt	2005 +35
Kirundi Wikipedia	Wikipediya mu Ikirundi	Kirundi	Latn	rn	730	7	Nov 2005	Wikipedia logo displaying the name "Wikipedia" and its slogan: "The Free Encyclopedia" below it, in English	2005 +35
Buginese Wikipedia	ᨓᨗᨀᨗᨄᨙᨉᨗᨕ ᨅᨔ ᨕᨘᨁᨗ (Wikipedia basa Ugi)	Buginese	Bugi	bug	15,976	15	Dec 2005	Wikipedia logo displaying the name "Wikipedia" and its slogan: "The Free Encyclopedia" below it, in Buginese	2005 +35
Romani Wikipedia	Romani Vikipidiya	Romani (Vlax Romani)	Latn	rmy	758	11	Dec 2005	Wikipedia logo displaying the name "Wikipedia" and its slogan: "The Free Encyclopedia" below it, in Vlax Romani	2005 +35
Gilaki Wikipedia	گیلکی ویکیپدیاٰ (Gilɵki vikipɵdiya)	Gilaki	Arab	glk	48,313	22	2006	Wikipedia logo displaying the name "Wikipedia" and its slogan: "The Free Encyclopedia" below it, in Gilaki	2006 +36
Norman Wikipedia	Augeron, Cotentinais, Percheron: Viqùipédie normaunde Auregnais: Ouitchipédie Nourmaounde; Brayon, Cauchois, Rouennais: Viqùipédie normande Guernésiais: Ouitchipédie normande Jèrriais: Ouitchipédie Nouormande; Sercquiais: Witchipedi Normãdi	Norman	Latn	nrm	5,059	7	2006	Wikipedia logo displaying the name "Wikipedia" and its slogan: "The Free Encyclopedia" below it, in Norman	2006 +36
Sindhi Wikipedia	سنڌي وڪيپيڊيا (Sindhi wikipidia)	Sindhi	Arab	sd	23,709	42	6 Feb 2006	Wikipedia logo displaying the name "Wikipedia" and its slogan: "The Free Encyclopedia" below it, in Sindhi	2006 +36
Pennsylvania Dutch Wikipedia	Pennsilfaanisch-Deitsche Wikipedelche	Pennsylvania Dutch	Latn	pdc	2,136	16	Mar 2006	Wikipedia logo displaying the name "Wikipedia" and its slogan: "The Free Encyclopedia" below it, in Pennsylvania Dutch	2006 +36
Luganda Wikipedia	Wikipediya Luganda	Luganda	Latn	lg	5,899	72	Mar 2006	Wikipedia logo displaying the name "Wikipedia" and its slogan: "The Free Encyclopedia" below it, in Luganda	2006 +36
West Flemish Wikipedia	West-Vlamse Wikipedia	West Flemish	Latn	vls	8,414	81	Mar 2006	Wikipedia logo displaying the name "Wikipedia" and its slogan: "The Free Encyclopedia" below it, in West Flemish	2006 +36
Kongo Wikipedia	Wikipedia kikôngo	Kongo	Latn	kg	2,112	14	Mar 2006	Wikipedia logo displaying the name "Wikipedia" and its slogan: "The Free Encyclopedia" below it, in Kongo	2006 +36
Dutch Low Saxon Wikipedia	Nedersaksische Wikipedie	Dutch Low Saxon	Latn	nds-nl	8,110	45	24 Mar 2006	Wikipedia logo displaying the name "Wikipedia" and its slogan: "The Free Encyclopedia" below it, in Dutch Low Saxon	2006 +36
Franco-Provençal Wikipedia	Vouiquipèdia en arpetan	Franco-Provençal	Latn	frp	5,845	25	24 Mar 2006	Wikipedia logo displaying the name "Wikipedia" and its slogan: "The Free Encyclopedia" below it, in Franco-Provençal	2006 +36
Kalmyk Wikipedia	Хальмг Бикипеди (Haľmg Vikipedi)	Kalmyk Oirat	Cyrl	xal	1,578	14	24 Mar 2006	Wikipedia logo displaying the name "Wikipedia" and its slogan: "The Free Encyclopedia" below it, in Kalmyk Oirat	2006 +36
Cantonese Wikipedia	Traditional Chinese: 粵文維基百科 (Jyutping: Jyut6 man4 wai4 gei1 baak3 fo1)	Cantonese	Hant	zh-yue	154,582	802	25 Mar 2006	Wikipedia logo displaying the name "Wikipedia" and its slogan: "The Free Encyclopedia" below it, in Cantonese	2006 +36
Samogitian Wikipedia	Žemaitėška Vikipedėjė	Samogitian	Latn	bat-smg	17,276	23	25 Mar 2006	Wikipedia logo displaying the name "Wikipedia" and its slogan: "The Free Encyclopedia" below it, in Samogitian	2006 +36
Papiamento Wikipedia	Wikipedia na papiamentu	Papiamento	Latn	pap	5,843	28	26 Mar 2006	Wikipedia logo displaying the name "Wikipedia" and its slogan: "The Free Encyclopedia" below it, in Papiamento	2006 +36
Piedmontese Wikipedia	Wikipedia an piemontèisa	Piedmontese	Latn	pms	71,569	37	27 Mar 2006	Wikipedia logo displaying the name "Wikipedia" and its slogan: "The Free Encyclopedia" below it, in Piedmontese	2006 +36
Low German Wikipedia	Plattdüütsche Wikipedia	Low German	Latn	nds	85,985	49	Apr 2006	Wikipedia logo displaying the name "Wikipedia" and its slogan: "The Free Encyclopedia" below it, in Low German	2006 +36
Tetun Wikipedia	Wikipédia iha lia-tetun	Tetun	Latn	tet	2,022	19	Apr 2006	Wikipedia logo displaying the name "Wikipedia" and its slogan: "The Free Encyclopedia" below it, in Tetun	2006 +36
Ligurian Wikipedia	Wikipedia Ligure	Ligurian	Latn	lij	11,666	25	Apr 2006	Wikipedia logo displaying the name "Wikipedia" and its slogan: "The Free Encyclopedia" below it, in Ligurian	2006 +36
Bavarian Wikipedia	Boarische Wikipedia	Bavarian	Latn	bar	27,255	60	2 May 2006	Wikipedia logo displaying the name "Wikipedia" and its slogan: "The Free Encyclopedia" below it, in Bavarian	2006 +36
Newar Wikipedia	𑐣𑐾𑐥𑐵𑐮𑐨𑐵𑐲𑐵 𑐰𑐶𑐎𑐶𑐥𑐶𑐡𑐶𑐫𑐵 (Nepālabhāshā vikipiḍiyā)	Newar	Deva/ Newa	new	75,052	28	4 Jun 2006	Wikipedia logo displaying the name "Wikipedia" and its slogan: "The Free Encyclopedia" below it, in Newar	2006 +36
Classical Chinese Wikipedia	文言維基大典 (Wényán wéijī dàdiǎn)	Classical Chinese	Hant	zh-classical	14,836	69	31 Jul 2006	Wikipedia logo displaying the name "Wikipedia" and its slogan: "The Free Encyclopedia" below it, in Classical Chinese	2006 +36
Bishnupriya Manipuri Wikipedia	বিষ্ণুপ্রিয়া মণিপুরী উইকিপিডিয়া (Bişnupriya mônipuri u'ikipiḍiẏā)	Bishnupriya Manipuri	Beng	bpy	25,097	13	30 Sep 2006	Wikipedia logo displaying the name "Wikipedia" and its slogan: "The Free Encyclopedia" below it, in Bishnupriya Manipuri	2006 +36
Buryat Wikipedia	Буряад Википеэди (Buryaad Vikipjeedi)	Buryat (Russia Buriat)	Cyrl	bxr	2,924	21	30 Sep 2006	Wikipedia logo displaying the name "Wikipedia" and its slogan: "The Free Encyclopedia" below it, in Russia Buriat	2006 +36
Eastern Min Wikipedia	Traditional Chinese: 閩東語維基百科; Bàng-uâ-cê: Bànguâpedia or Mìng-dĕ̤ng-ngṳ̄ Wikipedia	Eastern Min	Latn/ Hant	cdo	16,774	32	30 Sep 2006	Wikipedia logo displaying the name "Wikipedia" and its slogan: "The Free Encyclopedia" below it, in Eastern Min	2006 +36
Emilian-Romagnol Wikipedia	Emiliàn e rumagnòl Vichipedèia	Emilian–Romagnol	Latn	eml	14,359	23	30 Sep 2006	Wikipedia logo displaying the name "Wikipedia" and its slogan: "The Free Encyclopedia" below it, in Emilian–Romagnol	2006 +36
Mazanderani Wikipedia	مازرونی ویکی‌پدیا (Mazandarani vikipedi)	Mazanderani	Arab	mzn	76,254	58	30 Sep 2006	Wikipedia logo displaying the name "Wikipedia" and its slogan: "The Free Encyclopedia" below it, in Mazanderani	2006 +36
Novial Wikipedia	Wikipedie in novial	Novial	Latn	nov	2,067	11	30 Sep 2006	Wikipedia logo displaying the name "Wikipedia" and its slogan: "The Free Encyclopedia" below it, in Novial	2006 +36
Old Church Slavonic Wikipedia	Словѣньска Википєдїꙗ (Slověnĭska Vikipedija)	Old Church Slavonic	Cyrs	cu	1,516	19	30 Sep 2006	Wikipedia logo displaying the name "Wikipedia" and its slogan: "The Free Encyclopedia" below it, in Old Church Slavonic	2006 +36
Pangasinan Wikipedia	Wikipedia Pangasinan	Pangasinan	Latn	pag	2,654	19	30 Sep 2006	Wikipedia logo displaying the name "Wikipedia" and its slogan: "The Free Encyclopedia" below it, in Pangasinan	2006 +36
Tarantino Wikipedia	Uicchipèdie tarandíne	Tarantino	Latn	roa-tara	9,508	9	30 Sep 2006	Wikipedia logo displaying the name "Wikipedia" and its slogan: "The Free Encyclopedia" below it, in Tarantino	2006 +36
Zazaki Wikipedia	Wikipediyay Zazaki	Zaza	Latn	diq	45,823	37	30 Sep 2006	Wikipedia logo displaying the name "Wikipedia" and its slogan: "The Free Encyclopedia" below it, in Zaza	2006 +36
Zeelandic Wikipedia	Zeêuwstaelihe Wikipedia	Zeelandic	Latn	zea	7,456	23	30 Sep 2006	Wikipedia logo displaying the name "Wikipedia" and its slogan: "The Free Encyclopedia" below it, in Zeelandic	2006 +36
Chavacano Wikipedia	Chavacano Wikipedia	Zamboanga Chavacano	Latn	cbk-zam	2,878	20	30 Sep 2006	Wikipedia logo displaying the name "Wikipedia" and its slogan: "The Free Encyclopedia" below it, in Zamboanga Chavacano	2006 +36
Wu Wikipedia	Traditional Chinese: 吳語維基百科, simplified Chinese: 吴语维基百科 (Romanized: Wu-nyu Vi-ci-pah-khu)	Wu Chinese	Hans/ Hant	wuu	48,600	101	1 Oct 2006	Wikipedia logo displaying the name "Wikipedia" and its slogan: "The Free Encyclopedia" below it, in Wu Chinese	2006 +36
Upper Sorbian Wikipedia	Hornjoserbska wikipedija	Upper Sorbian	Latn	hsb	14,301	23	2 Oct 2006	Wikipedia logo displaying the name "Wikipedia" and its slogan: "The Free Encyclopedia" below it, in Upper Sorbian	2006 +36
Lak Wikipedia	Лакку мазрал Википедия (Lak:u mazral Vikipediaˤ)	Lak	Cyrl	lbe	1,054	8	Nov 2006	Wikipedia logo displaying the name "Wikipedia" and its slogan: "The Free Encyclopedia" below it, in Lak	2006 +36
Neapolitan Wikipedia	Wikipedia napulitana	Neapolitan	Latn	nap	15,027	22	21 Dec 2006	Wikipedia logo displaying the name "Wikipedia" and its slogan: "The Free Encyclopedia" below it, in Neapolitan	2006 +36
Extremaduran Wikipedia	Güiquipeya en estremeñu	Extremaduran	Latn	ext	4,300	35	27 Jan 2007	Wikipedia logo displaying the name "Wikipedia" and its slogan: "The Free Encyclopedia" below it, in Extremaduran	2007 +5
Belarusian Wikipedia	Беларуская Вікіпедыя (Bielaruskaja Vikipiedyja)	Belarusian (official Narkamaŭka orthography)	Cyrl	be	273,906	406	27 Mar 2007	Wikipedia logo displaying the name "Wikipedia" and its slogan: "The Free Encyclopedia" below it, in Belarusian	2007 +5
Hakka Wikipedia	Pha̍k-fa-sṳ: Hakkâpedia or Hak-kâ-ngî Wikipedia	Hakka Chinese	Latn	hak	10,516	29	27 May 2007	Wikipedia logo displaying the name "Wikipedia" and its slogan: "The Free Encyclopedia" below it, in Hakka Chinese	2007 +5
Kabyle Wikipedia	Wikipedia taqbaylit	Kabyle	Latn	kab	7,210	24	12 Nov 2007	Wikipedia logo displaying the name "Wikipedia" and its slogan: "The Free Encyclopedia" below it, in Kabyle	2007 +5
Central Bikol Wikipedia	Wikipedyang Bikol Sentral	Central Bikol	Latn	bcl	22,764	94	24 Nov 2007	Wikipedia logo displaying the name "Wikipedia" and its slogan: "The Free Encyclopedia" below it, in Central Bikol	2007 +5
Yoruba Wikipedia	Wikipéédíà Yorùbá	Yoruba	Latn	yo	41,368	68	2008	Wikipedia logo displaying the name "Wikipedia" and its slogan: "The Free Encyclopedia" below it, in Yoruba	2008 +14
Crimean Tatar Wikipedia	Qırımtatarca Vikipediya	Crimean Tatar	Latn	crh	29,844	55	12 Jan 2008	Wikipedia logo displaying the name "Wikipedia" and its slogan: "The Free Encyclopedia" below it, in Crimean Tatar	2008 +14
Erzya Wikipedia	Эрзянь Википедия (Erzäń Vikipedija)	Erzya	Cyrl	myv	7,878	12	26 May 2008	Wikipedia logo displaying the name "Wikipedia" and its slogan: "The Free Encyclopedia" below it, in Erzya	2008 +14
Moksha Wikipedia	Мокшень Википедиесь (Mokšenj Vikipedijesʹ)	Moksha	Cyrl	mdf	7,631	20	26 May 2008	Wikipedia logo displaying the name "Wikipedia" and its slogan: "The Free Encyclopedia" below it, in Moksha	2008 +14
Silesian Wikipedia	Ślůnsko Wikipedyjo	Silesian	Latn	szl	61,690	44	26 May 2008	Wikipedia logo displaying the name "Wikipedia" and its slogan: "The Free Encyclopedia" below it, in Silesian	2008 +14
Yakut Wikipedia	Сахалыы Бикипиэдьийэ (Sahalyy Bikipieçje)	Yakut	Cyrl	sah	18,291	45	26 May 2008	Wikipedia logo displaying the name "Wikipedia" and its slogan: "The Free Encyclopedia" below it, in Yakut	2008 +14
Gan Wikipedia	Traditional Chinese: 贛語維基百科, simplified Chinese: 赣语维基百科 (Pha̍k-oa-chhi: Gon wéijī bǎikē)	Gan Chinese	Hans/ Hant	gan	6,821	49	27 May 2008	Wikipedia logo displaying the name "Wikipedia" and its slogan: "The Free Encyclopedia" below it, in Gan Chinese	2008 +14
Western Punjabi Wikipedia	پنجابی وکیپیڈیا (Pañjābī vikīpīḍīā)	Western Punjabi	Arab	pnb	75,825	56	24 Oct 2008	Wikipedia logo displaying the name "Wikipedia" and its slogan: "The Free Encyclopedia" below it, in Western Punjabi	2008 +14
Fiji Hindi Wikipedia	Fiji Baat Wikipedia	Fiji Hindi	Latn	hif	12,529	72	12 Nov 2008	Wikipedia logo displaying the name "Wikipedia" and its slogan: "The Free Encyclopedia" below it, in Fiji Hindi	2008 +14
Karakalpak Wikipedia	Qaraqalpaq Wikipediası	Karakalpak	Latn	kaa	75,478	61	12 Nov 2008	Wikipedia logo displaying the name "Wikipedia" and its slogan: "The Free Encyclopedia" below it, in Karakalpak	2008 +14
Lower Sorbian Wikipedia	Dolnoserbska wikipedija	Lower Sorbian	Latn	dsb	3,468	19	12 Nov 2008	Wikipedia logo displaying the name "Wikipedia" and its slogan: "The Free Encyclopedia" below it, in Lower Sorbian	2008 +14
Saterland Frisian Wikipedia	Seelterfräiske Wikipedia	Saterland Frisian	Latn	stq	4,202	11	12 Nov 2008	Wikipedia logo displaying the name "Wikipedia" and its slogan: "The Free Encyclopedia" below it, in Saterland Frisian	2008 +14
Sranan Tongo Wikipedia	Sranan Wikipedia	Sranan Tongo	Latn	srn	1,135	4	12 Nov 2008	Wikipedia logo displaying the name "Wikipedia" and its slogan: "The Free Encyclopedia" below it, in Sranan Tongo	2008 +14
Egyptian Arabic Wikipedia	ويكيپيديا مصرى (Wīkībīdiyā maṣri)	Egyptian Arabic	Arab	arz	1,634,163	299	24 Nov 2008	Wikipedia logo displaying the name "Wikipedia" and its slogan: "The Free Encyclopedia" below it, in Egyptian Arabic	2008 +14
Pontic Wikipedia	Ποντιακόν Βικιπαίδεια (Pontiakón Bikipaídeia)	Pontic Greek	Grek	pnt	687	6	5 Mar 2009	Wikipedia logo displaying the name "Wikipedia" and its slogan: "The Free Encyclopedia" below it, in Pontic Greek	2009 +6
Picard Wikipedia	Wikipédia in lingue picarde	Picard	Latn	pcd	6,162	33	19 Mar 2009	Wikipedia logo displaying the name "Wikipedia" and its slogan: "The Free Encyclopedia" below it, in Picard	2009 +6
Meadow Mari Wikipedia	Олык Марий Википедий (Olyk Marij Vikipedij)	Meadow Mari	Cyrl	mhr	11,328	17	9 Jul 2009	Wikipedia logo displaying the name "Wikipedia" and its slogan: "The Free Encyclopedia" below it, in Meadow Mari	2009 +6
Acehnese Wikipedia	Wikipèdia bahsa Acèh	Acehnese	Latn	ace	13,085	31	12 Aug 2009	Wikipedia logo displaying the name "Wikipedia" and its slogan: "The Free Encyclopedia" below it, in Acehnese	2009 +6
Mirandese Wikipedia	Biquipédia an lhéngua mirandesa	Mirandese	Latn	mwl	4,359	25	12 Aug 2009	Wikipedia logo displaying the name "Wikipedia" and its slogan: "The Free Encyclopedia" below it, in Mirandese	2009 +6
Sorani Kurdish Wikipedia	ویکیپیدیای کوردیی سۆرانی (Wîkîpîdiyay Kurdî Soranî)	Kurdish (Sorani)	Arab	ckb	85,297	140	13 Aug 2009	Wikipedia logo displaying the name "Wikipedia" and its slogan: "The Free Encyclopedia" below it, in Sorani Kurdish	2009 +6
Karachay-Balkar Wikipedia	Къарачай-Малкъар Википедия (Qaraçay-Malqar Wikipédiya)	Karachay-Balkar	Cyrl	krc	3,126	14	19 Mar 2010	Wikipedia logo displaying the name "Wikipedia" and its slogan: "The Free Encyclopedia" below it, in Karachay-Balkar	2010 +7
North Frisian Wikipedia	Nordfriisk Wikipedia	North Frisian	Latn	frr	21,665	22	19 Aug 2010	Wikipedia logo displaying the name "Wikipedia" and its slogan: "The Free Encyclopedia" below it, in North Frisian	2010 +7
Banjarese Wikipedia	Wikipidia basa Banjar	Banjarese	Latn	bjn	12,528	48	17 Oct 2010	Wikipedia logo displaying the name "Wikipedia" and its slogan: "The Free Encyclopedia" below it, in Banjarese	2010 +7
Hill Mari Wikipedia	Кырык марла Википеди (Kyryk marla Vikipedi)	Hill Mari	Cyrl	mrj	10,437	10	17 Oct 2010	Wikipedia logo displaying the name "Wikipedia" and its slogan: "The Free Encyclopedia" below it, in Hill Mari	2010 +7
Komi-Permyak Wikipedia	Перем коми Википедия (Perem komi Vikipedija)	Komi-Permyak	Cyrl	koi	3,472	7	19 Oct 2010	Wikipedia logo displaying the name "Wikipedia" and its slogan: "The Free Encyclopedia" below it, in Komi-Permyak	2010 +7
Gagauz Wikipedia	Gagauzca Vikipediya	Gagauz	Latn	gag	3,010	12	13 Nov 2010	Wikipedia logo displaying the name "Wikipedia" and its slogan: "The Free Encyclopedia" below it, in Gagauz	2010 +7
Palatine German Wikipedia	Pälzisch Wikipedia	Palatine German	Latn	pfl	2,869	12	13 Nov 2010	Wikipedia logo displaying the name "Wikipedia" and its slogan: "The Free Encyclopedia" below it, in Palatine German	2010 +7
Rusyn Wikipedia	Русиньска Вікіпедія (Rusîn'ska Vikipedija)	Rusyn	Cyrl	rue	7,443	44	23 Jan 2011	Wikipedia logo displaying the name "Wikipedia" and its slogan: "The Free Encyclopedia" below it, in Rusyn	2011 +6
Kabardian Wikipedia	Адыгэбзэ Уикипедиэ (Adıgəbzə Wikipediă)	Kabardian	Cyrl	kbd	1,675	10	18 Mar 2011	Wikipedia logo displaying the name "Wikipedia" and its slogan: "The Free Encyclopedia" below it, in Kabardian	2011 +6
Latgalian Wikipedia	Vikipedeja latgaļu volūdā	Latgalian	Latn	ltg	1,164	4	18 Mar 2011	Wikipedia logo displaying the name "Wikipedia" and its slogan: "The Free Encyclopedia" below it, in Latgalian	2011 +6
Mingrelian Wikipedia	მარგალური ვიკიპედია (Margaluri vik’ip’edia)	Mingrelian	Geor	xmf	22,516	32	12 Jun 2011	Wikipedia logo displaying the name "Wikipedia" and its slogan: "The Free Encyclopedia" below it, in Mingrelian	2011 +6
Sango Wikipedia	Wïkïpêdïyäa na Sängö	Sango	Latn	sg	376	11	21 Oct 2011	Wikipedia logo displaying the name "Wikipedia" and its slogan: "The Free Encyclopedia" below it, in Sango	2011 +6
Northern Sotho Wikipedia	Wikipedia Sesotho sa Leboa	Northern Sotho	Latn	nso	9,138	14	29 Oct 2011	Wikipedia logo displaying the name "Wikipedia" and its slogan: "The Free Encyclopedia" below it, in Northern Sotho	2011 +6
Veps Wikipedia	Vepsän Vikipedii	Veps	Latn	vep	7,117	25	1 Feb 2012	Wikipedia logo displaying the name "Wikipedia" and its slogan: "The Free Encyclopedia" below it, in Veps	2012 +3
Lezgian Wikipedia	Лезги Википедия (Lezgi Vikipediä)	Lezgian	Cyrl	lez	4,507	23	27 Mar 2012	Wikipedia logo displaying the name "Wikipedia" and its slogan: "The Free Encyclopedia" below it, in Lezgian	2012 +3
Cornish Wikipedia	Wikipedya Kernewek	Cornish	Latn	kw	7,286	22	10 May 2012	Wikipedia logo displaying the name "Wikipedia" and its slogan: "The Free Encyclopedia" below it, in Cornish	2012 +3
Minangkabau Wikipedia	Wikipedia Minangkabau	Minangkabau	Latn	min	230,099	74	7 Feb 2013	Wikipedia logo displaying the name "Wikipedia" and its slogan: "The Free Encyclopedia" below it, in Minangkabau	2013 +2
Tuvan Wikipedia	Тыва Википедия (Tıwa Vikipediya)	Tuvan	Cyrl	tyv	4,126	15	11 Aug 2013	Wikipedia logo displaying the name "Wikipedia" and its slogan: "The Free Encyclopedia" below it, in Tuvan	2013 +2
Maithili Wikipedia	मैथिली विकिपिडिया (Maithilī vikipiḍiyā)	Maithili	Deva	mai	14,359	37	6 Nov 2014	Wikipedia logo displaying the name "Wikipedia" and its slogan: "The Free Encyclopedia" below it, in Maithili	2014 +1
Konkani Wikipedia	कोंकणी विकिपीडिया (Konknni Wikipidia) (ಕೊಂಕ್ಣಿ ವಿಕಿಪೀಡಿಯಾ)	Konkani (Goan Konkani)	Deva/ Latn/ Knda	gom	3,644	34	16 Jun 2015	Wikipedia logo displaying the name "Wikipedia" and its slogan: "The Free Encyclopedia" below it, in Goan Konkani	2015 +2
South Azerbaijani Wikipedia	تورکجه ویکی‌پدیا (Azərbaycanca Vikipediya)	South Azerbaijani	Arab	azb	244,960	112	22 Jul 2015	Wikipedia logo displaying the name "Wikipedia" and its slogan: "The Free Encyclopedia" below it, in South Azerbaijani	2015 +2
Jamaican Patois Wikipedia	Jumiekan Patwa Wikipidia	Jamaican Patois	Latn	jam	1,721	16	2 May 2016	Wikipedia logo displaying the name "Wikipedia" and its slogan: "The Free Encyclopedia" below it, in Jamaican Patois	2016 +4
Tulu Wikipedia	ತುಳು ವಿಕಿಪೀಡಿಯ (Tuḷu vikipīḍiya)	Tulu	Knda	tcy	4,029	27	6 Aug 2016	Wikipedia logo displaying the name "Wikipedia" and its slogan: "The Free Encyclopedia" below it, in Tulu	2016 +4
Livvi-Karelian Wikipedia	Livvinkarjalan Wikipedii	Livvi-Karelian	Latn	olo	5,252	20	7 Oct 2016	Wikipedia logo displaying the name "Wikipedia" and its slogan: "The Free Encyclopedia" below it, in Livvi-Karelian	2016 +4
Adyghe Wikipedia	Адыгэ Википедие (Adıgə Vikipedie)	Adyghe	Cyrl	ady	649	16	11 Feb 2016	Wikipedia logo displaying the name "Wikipedia" and its slogan: "The Free Encyclopedia" below it, in Adyghe	2016 +4
Doteli Wikipedia	डोटेली विकिपिडिया (Ḍōṭēlī vikipiḍiyā)	Doteli	Deva	dty	3,814	10	24 Apr 2017	Wikipedia logo displaying the name "Wikipedia" and its slogan: "The Free Encyclopedia" below it, in Doteli	2017 +4
Atikamekw Wikipedia	Atikamekw Wikipetcia	Atikamekw	Latn	atj	2,083	7	21 Jun 2017	Wikipedia logo displaying the name "Wikipedia" and its slogan: "The Free Encyclopedia" below it, in Atikamekw	2017 +4
Kabiye Wikipedia	Wikipediya kabɩyɛ	Kabiye	Latn	kbp	1,716	11	23 Jun 2017	Wikipedia logo displaying the name "Wikipedia" and its slogan: "The Free Encyclopedia" below it, in Kabiye	2017 +4
Dinka Wikipedia	Wikipedia Thuɔŋjäŋ	Dinka	Latn	din	341	7	12 Jul 2017	Wikipedia logo displaying the name "Wikipedia" and its slogan: "The Free Encyclopedia" below it, in Dinka	2017 +4
Gorontalo Wikipedia	Wikipedia bahasa Hulontalo	Gorontalo	Latn	gor	15,159	41	18 Apr 2018	Wikipedia logo displaying the name "Wikipedia" and its slogan: "The Free Encyclopedia" below it, in Gorontalo	2018 +6
Ingush Wikipedia	Гӏалгӏай Википеди (Ghalghaj Vikipedi)	Ingush	Cyrl	inh	2,561	14	18 Apr 2018	Wikipedia logo displaying the name "Wikipedia" and its slogan: "The Free Encyclopedia" below it, in Ingush	2018 +6
Lingua Franca Nova Wikipedia	Vicipedia en lingua franca nova	Lingua Franca Nova	Latn	lfn	4,689	20	18 Apr 2018	Wikipedia logo displaying the name "Wikipedia" and its slogan: "The Free Encyclopedia" below it, in Lingua Franca Nova	2018 +6
Igbo Wikipedia	Wikipedia Igbo	Igbo	Latn	ig	49,316	94	11 May 2018	Wikipedia logo displaying the name "Wikipedia" and its slogan: "The Free Encyclopedia" below it, in Igbo	2018 +6
Santali Wikipedia	ᱥᱟᱱᱛᱟᱲᱤ ᱣᱤᱠᱤᱯᱤᱰᱤᱭᱟ (Santaṛi wikipiḍiya)	Santali	Olck	sat	16,118	55	2 Aug 2018	Wikipedia logo displaying the name "Wikipedia" and its slogan: "The Free Encyclopedia" below it, in Santali	2018 +6
Shan Wikipedia	ဝီႇၶီႇၽီးတီးယႃးတႆး (Wiː-kʰiː-pʰiː-tiː-jaɑː- táy)	Shan	Mymr	shn	55,364	22	14 Nov 2018	Wikipedia logo displaying the name "Wikipedia" and its slogan: "The Free Encyclopedia" below it, in Shan	2018 +6
Tibetan Wikipedia	བོད་ཡིག་གི་ཝེ་ཁེ་རིག་མཛོད (Wylie: Bod yig gi we khe rig mdzod)	Central Tibetan (Lhasa Tibetan)	Tibt	bo	8,113	26	13 Jan 2019	Wikipedia logo displaying the name "Wikipedia" and its slogan: "The Free Encyclopedia" below it, in Lhasa Tibetan	2019 +7
Western Armenian Wikipedia	Արեւմտահայերէն Ուիքիփետիա (Arevmdahayerēn Uikʿipʿetia)	Western Armenian	Armn	hyw	15,115	37	1 Apr 2019	Wikipedia logo displaying the name "Wikipedia" and its slogan: "The Free Encyclopedia" below it, in Western Armenian	2019 +7
N'Ko Wikipedia	ߥߞߌߔߘߋߞߎ ߒߞߏ (Wkipdeku n'ko)	N'Ko	Nkoo	nqo	1,622	8	26 Sep 2019	Wikipedia logo displaying the name "Wikipedia" and its slogan: "The Free Encyclopedia" below it, in N'Ko	2019 +7
Balinese Wikipedia	Wikipédia Basa Bali (ᬯᬶᬓᬶᬧᬾᬤᬶᬬ ᬩᬲᬩᬮᬶ)	Balinese	Latn	ban	39,589	145	14 Oct 2019	Wikipedia logo displaying the name "Wikipedia" and its slogan: "The Free Encyclopedia" below it, in Balinese	2019 +7
Mon Wikipedia	ဝဳကဳပဳဒဳယာမန် (Wīkīpīdīya mawn)	Mon	Mymr	mnw	5,272	25	4 Nov 2019	Wikipedia logo displaying the name "Wikipedia" and its slogan: "The Free Encyclopedia" below it, in Mon	2019 +7
Guianan Creole Wikipedia	Wikipédja an kriyòl gwiyannen	French Guianese Creole	Latn	gcr	1,077	6	22 Nov 2019	Wikipedia logo displaying the name "Wikipedia" and its slogan: "The Free Encyclopedia" below it, in French Guianese Creole	2019 +7
Sakizaya Wikipedia	Wikipitiya nu Sakizaya	Sakizaya	Latn	szy	2,760	14	22 Nov 2019	Wikipedia logo displaying the name "Wikipedia" and its slogan: "The Free Encyclopedia" below it, in Sakizaya	2019 +7
Hausa Wikipedia	Wikipedia Hausa	Hausa	Latn	ha	121,916	322	2020	Wikipedia logo displaying the name "Wikipedia" and its slogan: "The Free Encyclopedia" below it, in Hausa	2020 +8
Awadhi Wikipedia	अवधी विकिपीडिया (Avadhī vikipīḍiyā)	Awadhi	Deva	awa	3,023	25	21 May 2020	Wikipedia logo displaying the name "Wikipedia" and its slogan: "The Free Encyclopedia" below it, in Awadhi	2020 +8
Moroccan Arabic Wikipedia	ويكيبيديا المغربية (Wīkībīdiyā maḡribiyy)	Moroccan Arabic	Arab	ary	20,597	74	20 Jul 2020	Wikipedia logo displaying the name "Wikipedia" and its slogan: "The Free Encyclopedia" below it, in Moroccan Arabic	2020 +8
Ladin Wikipedia	Wikipedia per ladin	Ladin	Latn	lld	183,254	33	17 Aug 2020	Wikipedia logo displaying the name "Wikipedia" and its slogan: "The Free Encyclopedia" below it, in Ladin	2020 +8
Inari Sámi Wikipedia	Anarâškielâlâš Wikipedia	Inari Sámi	Latn	smn	6,762	18	19 Oct 2020	Wikipedia logo displaying the name "Wikipedia" and its slogan: "The Free Encyclopedia" below it, in Inari Sámi	2020 +8
Saraiki Wikipedia	سرائیکی ویٖکیٖپیڈیا (Sarā'īkī vikipīḍiyā)	Saraiki	Arab	skr	25,168	20	22 Nov 2020	Wikipedia logo displaying the name "Wikipedia" and its slogan: "The Free Encyclopedia" below it, in Saraiki	2020 +8
Madurese Wikipedia	Wikipèḍia bhâsa Madhurâ	Madurese	Latn	mad	5,686	80	15 Dec 2020	Wikipedia logo displaying the name "Wikipedia" and its slogan: "The Free Encyclopedia" below it, in Madurese	2020 +8
Kotava Wikipedia	Wikipedia men Kotava	Kotava	Latn	avk	29,908	23	29 Dec 2020	Wikipedia logo displaying the name "Wikipedia" and its slogan: "The Free Encyclopedia" below it, in Kotava	2020 +8
Nias Wikipedia	Wikipedia Li Niha	Nias	Latn	nia	1,826	6	11 Jan 2021	Wikipedia logo displaying the name "Wikipedia" and its slogan: "The Free Encyclopedia" below it, in Nias	2021 +9
Meitei Wikipedia	ꯃꯤꯇꯩꯂꯣꯟ ꯋꯤꯀꯤꯄꯦꯗꯤꯌꯥ (Meeteilon weekeepaydeeya)	Meitei	Mtei	mni	10,531	29	22 Feb 2021	Wikipedia logo displaying the name "Wikipedia" and its slogan: "The Free Encyclopedia" below it, in Meitei	2021 +9
Southern Altai Wikipedia	Тӱштӱк алтай Википедия (Tüštük altay Vikipediya)	Southern Altai	Cyrl	alt	1,118	14	22 Feb 2021	Wikipedia logo displaying the name "Wikipedia" and its slogan: "The Free Encyclopedia" below it, in Southern Altai	2021 +9
Atayal Wikipedia	Wikibitia na Tayal	Atayal	Latn	tay	2,587	22	16 Mar 2021	Wikipedia logo displaying the name "Wikipedia" and its slogan: "The Free Encyclopedia" below it, in Atayal	2021 +9
Seediq Wikipedia	Seediq Wikipidiya	Seediq	Latn	trv	1,201	12	16 Mar 2021	Wikipedia logo displaying the name "Wikipedia" and its slogan: "The Free Encyclopedia" below it, in Seediq	2021 +9
Dagbani Wikipedia	Wikipidia Dagbani	Dagbani	Latn	dag	14,578	40	30 Jun 2021	Wikipedia logo displaying the name "Wikipedia" and its slogan: "The Free Encyclopedia" below it, in Dagbani	2021 +9
Shilha Wikipedia	Wikipidya taclḥiyt (ⵡⵉⴽⵉⵒⵉⴷⵢⴰ ⵜⴰⵛⵍⵃⵉⵜ)	Shilha	Latn/ Tfng	shi	10,893	33	30 Jun 2021	Wikipedia logo displaying the name "Wikipedia" and its slogan: "The Free Encyclopedia" below it, in Shilha	2021 +9
Amis Wikipedia	Wikipitiya 'Amis	Amis	Latn	ami	1,143	12	28 Oct 2021	Wikipedia logo displaying the name "Wikipedia" and its slogan: "The Free Encyclopedia" below it, in Amis	2021 +9
Paiwan Wikipedia	wikipidiya nua pinayuanan	Paiwan	Latn	pwn	377	8	28 Oct 2021	Wikipedia logo displaying the name "Wikipedia" and its slogan: "The Free Encyclopedia" below it, in Paiwan	2021 +9
Gun Wikipedia	Gungbe Wikipedia	Gun	Latn	guw	1,703	9	23 Mar 2022	Wikipedia logo displaying the name "Wikipedia" and its slogan: "The Free Encyclopedia" below it, in Gun	2022 +4
Tyap Wikipedia	Wukipedia nTyap	Tyap	Latn	kcg	2,188	21	16 May 2022	Wikipedia logo displaying the name "Wikipedia" and its slogan: "The Free Encyclopedia" below it, in Tyap	2022 +4
Pa'O Wikipedia	ပအိုဝ်ႏဝီခီပီးဒီးယား (Pǎʼǒ wikhipi:di:ya)	Pa'O	Mymr	blk	3,155	7	19 Jul 2022	Wikipedia logo displaying the name "Wikipedia" and its slogan: "The Free Encyclopedia" below it, in Pa'O	2022 +4
Nigerian Pidgin Wikipedia	Naijá Wikipedia	Nigerian Pidgin	Latn	pcm	1,727	27	17 Aug 2022	Wikipedia logo displaying the name "Wikipedia" and its slogan: "The Free Encyclopedia" below it, in Nigerian Pidgin	2022 +4
Gurene Wikipedia	Gurenɛ Wikipedia	Farefare (Gurene)	Latn	gur	1,385	2	27 Feb 2023	Wikipedia logo displaying the name "Wikipedia" and its slogan: "The Free Encyclopedia" below it, in Gurene	2023 +10
Wayuu Wikipedia	Wikipeetia süka wayuunaiki	Wayuu	Latn	guc	718	27	27 Feb 2023	Wikipedia logo displaying the name "Wikipedia" and its slogan: "The Free Encyclopedia" below it, in Wayuu	2023 +10
Angika Wikipedia	विकिपीडिया	Angika	Deva	anp	1,697	13	22 Mar 2023	Wikipedia logo displaying the name "Wikipedia" and its slogan: "The Free Encyclopedia" below it, in Angika	2023 +10
Fante Wikipedia	Fante Wikipedia	Fante	Latn	fat	1,801	17	20 Apr 2023	Wikipedia logo displaying the name "Wikipedia" and its slogan: "The Free Encyclopedia" below it, in Fante	2023 +10
Ghanaian Pidgin Wikipedia	Ghanaian Pidgin Wikipedia	Ghanaian Pidgin English	Latn	gpe	5,885	47	5 Jul 2023	Wikipedia logo displaying the name "Wikipedia" and its slogan: "The Free Encyclopedia" below it, in Ghanaian Pidgin	2023 +10
Talysh Wikipedia	Tolyšə Vikipedijə	Talysh	Latn	tly	10,257	61	30 Aug 2023	Wikipedia logo displaying the name "Wikipedia" and its slogan: "The Free Encyclopedia" below it, in Talysh	2023 +10
Fon Wikipedia	Wikipedya ɖò Fɔngbemɛ	Fon	Latn	fon	5,627	16	3 Oct 2023	Wikipedia logo displaying the name "Wikipedia" and its slogan: "The Free Encyclopedia" below it, in Fon	2023 +10
Dagaare Wikipedia	Dagaare Wikipiideɛ	Dagaare	Latn	dga	3,479	8	6 Nov 2023	Wikipedia logo displaying the name "Wikipedia" and its slogan: "The Free Encyclopedia" below it, in Dagaare	2023 +10
Toba Batak Wikipedia	Wikipedia Batak Toba	Toba Batak	Latn	bbc	1,504	7	6 Nov 2023	Wikipedia logo displaying the name "Wikipedia" and its slogan: "The Free Encyclopedia" below it, in Toba Batak	2023 +10
Moroccan Amazigh Wikipedia	ⵡⵉⴽⵉⴱⵉⴷⵢⴰ ⵜⴰⵎⴰⵣⵉⵖⵜ ⵜⴰⵏⴰⵡⴰⵢⵜ (Wikibidya tamaziɣt tanawayt)	Standard Moroccan Amazigh	Tfng	zgh	12,314	46	6 Nov 2023	Wikipedia logo displaying the name "Wikipedia" and its slogan: "The Free Encyclopedia" below it, in Standard Moroccan Amazigh	2023 +10
Betawi Wikipedia	Wikipédi basa Betawi	Betawi	Latn	bew	3,354	18	24 Apr 2024	Wikipedia logo displaying the name "Wikipedia" and its slogan: "The Free Encyclopedia" below it, in Betawi	2024 +15
Igala Wikipedia	Wikipídiya Igala	Igala	Latn	igl	1,905	20	24 Apr 2024	Wikipedia logo displaying the name "Wikipedia" and its slogan: "The Free Encyclopedia" below it, in Igala	2024 +15
Kusaal Wikipedia	Wikipiidia Kʋsaal	Kusaal	Latn	kus	1,382	9	24 Apr 2024	Wikipedia logo displaying the name "Wikipedia" and its slogan: "The Free Encyclopedia" below it, in Kusaal	2024 +15
Dusun Wikipedia	Wikipedia Kadazandusun	Dusun	Latn	dtp	2,063	23	28 May 2024	Wikipedia logo displaying the name "Wikipedia" and its slogan: "The Free Encyclopedia" below it, in Dusun	2024 +15
Mandailing Batak Wikipedia	Wikipedia Saro Mandailing	Mandailing Batak	Latn	btm	1,237	8	21 Jun 2024	Wikipedia logo displaying the name "Wikipedia" and its slogan: "The Free Encyclopedia" below it, in Mandailing Batak	2024 +15
Dzongkha Wikipedia	རྫོང་ཁ་ཝེ་ཁེ་རིག་མཛོད (Rdzong kha we khe rig mdzod)	Dzongkha	Tibt	dz	386	13	12 Jul 2024	Wikipedia logo displaying the name "Wikipedia" and its slogan: "The Free Encyclopedia" below it, in Dzongkha	2024 +15
Bajau Sama Wikipedia	Wikipidia Bajau Sama	West Coast Bajau	Latn	bdr	314	5	6 Aug 2024	Wikipedia logo displaying the name "Wikipedia" and its slogan: "The Free Encyclopedia" below it, in West Coast Bajau	2024 +15
Komering Wikipedia	Wikipidiya basa Kumoring	Komering	Latn	kge	2,910	3	24 Sep 2024	Wikipedia logo displaying the name "Wikipedia" and its slogan: "The Free Encyclopedia" below it, in Komering	2024 +15
Mooré Wikipedia	Wikipidiya Mossi	Mooré	Latn	mos	1,326	2	24 Sep 2024	Wikipedia logo displaying the name "Wikipedia" and its slogan: "The Free Encyclopedia" below it, in Mooré	2024 +15
Iban Wikipedia	Iban Wikipedia	Iban	Latn	iba	2,700	23	14 Oct 2024	Wikipedia logo displaying the name "Wikipedia" and its slogan: "The Free Encyclopedia" below it, in Iban	2024 +15
Obolo Wikipedia	Wìkìpedia Usem Obolo	Obolo	Latn	ann	439	9	14 Oct 2024	Wikipedia logo displaying the name "Wikipedia" and its slogan: "The Free Encyclopedia" below it, in Obolo	2024 +15
Pannonian Rusyn Wikipedia	Википедия на панонским руским язику (Vikipedija na panonskim ruskim jaziku)	Pannonian Rusyn	Cyrl	rsk	1,662	13	14 Oct 2024	Wikipedia logo displaying the name "Wikipedia" and its slogan: "The Free Encyclopedia" below it, in Pannonian Rusyn	2024 +15
Southern Ndebele Wikipedia	Wikiphidiya yelimi lesiNdebele	Southern Ndebele	Latn	nr	339	8	14 Oct 2024	Wikipedia logo displaying the name "Wikipedia" and its slogan: "The Free Encyclopedia" below it, in English	2024 +15
Tai Nuea Wikipedia	ᥝᥤᥱ ᥑᥤᥱ ᥚᥤᥱ ᥖᥤᥱ ᥕᥣᥱ ᥖᥭᥰ ᥖᥬᥲ ᥑᥨᥒᥰ	Tai Nuea	Tale	tdd	462	7	14 Oct 2024	Wikipedia logo displaying the name "Wikipedia" and its slogan: "The Free Encyclopedia" below it, in Tai Nuea	2024 +15
Tigre Wikipedia	ዊኪፒድያ ህግየ ትግሬ	Tigre	Ethi	tig	135	15	12 Dec 2024	Wikipedia logo displaying the name "Wikipedia" and its slogan: "The Free Encyclopedia" below it, in Tigre	2024 +15
Central Kanuri Wikipedia	Wikipedia tǝlam kanuri	Central Kanuri	Latn	knc	2,151	9	30 Jan 2025	Wikipedia logo displaying the name "Wikipedia" and its slogan: "The Free Encyclopedia" below it, in English	2025 +4
Sylheti Wikipedia	ꠍꠤꠟꠐꠤ ꠃꠁꠇꠤꠙꠤꠒꠤꠀꠞ (Silôṭi uikifiḍiẏa)	Sylheti	Sylo	syl	1,259	14	25 Feb 2025	Wikipedia logo displaying the name "Wikipedia" and its slogan: "The Free Encyclopedia" below it, in Sylheti	2025 +4
Nupe Wikipedia	Wikipedia Nya Nupe	Nupe	Latn	nup	1,258	18	24 Apr 2025	Wikipedia logo displaying the name "Wikipedia" and its slogan: "The Free Encyclopedia" below it, in English	2025 +4
Arakanese Wikipedia	ရခိုင်ဝီကီးပီးဒီယား	Rakhine	Mymr	rki	2,148	14	29 Aug 2025	Wikipedia logo displaying the name "Wikipedia" and its slogan: "The Free Encyclopedia" below it, in Arakanese	2025 +4
Jju Wikipedia	Wikipedia Asat Angban Bvwo	Jju	Latn	kaj	304	11	26 Jan 2026	Wikipedia logo displaying the name "Wikipedia" and its slogan: "The Free Encyclopedia" below it, in Jju	2026 +6
Nawat Wikipedia	Wikipedia Ne Wey Amachti Tupal	Nawat	Latn	ppl	265	14	29 Jan 2026	Wikipedia logo displaying the name "Wikipedia" and its slogan: "The Free Encyclopedia" below it, in Nawat	2026 +6
Karekare Wikipedia	Karai-Karai Wikipedia	Karekare	Latn	kai	2,067	8	6 Mar 2026	Wikipedia logo displaying the name "Wikipedia" and its slogan: "The Free Encyclopedia" below it, in Karekare	2026 +6
Magahi Wikipedia	मगही विकिपीडिया (Magahī vikipīḍiyā)	Magahi	Deva	mag	3,828	23	18 Jun 2026	Wikipedia logo displaying the name "Wikipedia" and its slogan: "The Free Encyclopedia" below it, in Magahi	2026 +6
Interslavic Wikipedia	Medžuslovjanska Vikipedija (Меджусловјанска Википедија)	Interslavic	Latn/ Cyrl	isv	1,793	30	23 Jun 2026	Wikipedia logo displaying the name "Wikipedia" and its slogan: "The Free Encyclopedia" below it, in Interslavic	2026 +6
Bole Wikipedia	Wikipidiya in bòo pìkkà	Bole	Latn	bol	495	21	21 Jul 2026	Wikipedia logo displaying the name "Wikipedia" and its slogan: "The Free Encyclopedia" below it, in Bole	2026 +6

=== Closed and read-only Wikipedias ===
The table below lists all the closed and read-only, language and non-language editions of Wikipedia sorted by the date of closing.

Wikipedia editions
Wikipedia name in English	Wikipedia name in native language	Language	Script (ISO 15924 code)	Wikipedia code (linked to wp-main page)	Articles	Active users	Launch date	Closing date	Logo	WPs per year
Kanuri Wikipedia		Kanuri	Latn	kr (closed)	0	1	Unknown date	3 May 2007	Wikipedia logo displaying the name "Wikipedia" and its slogan: "The Free Encyclopedia" below it, in English	2007 −7
Choctaw Wikipedia		Choctaw	Latn	cho (closed)	6	0	Unknown date	3 Jul 2007	Wikipedia logo displaying the name "Wikipedia" and its slogan: "The Free Encyclopedia" below it, in English	2007 −7
Hiri Motu Wikipedia		Hiri Motu	Latn	ho (closed)	3	0	Unknown date	9 Jul 2007	Wikipedia logo displaying the name "Wikipedia" and its slogan: "The Free Encyclopedia" below it, in English	2007 −7
Kwanyama Wikipedia		Ovambo (Kwanyama)	Latn	kj (closed)	4	0	9 Aug 2004	10 Jul 2007	Wikipedia logo displaying the name "Wikipedia" and its slogan: "The Free Encyclopedia" below it, in English	2007 −7
Muscogee Wikipedia		Muscogee	Latn	mus (closed)	1	0	Unknown date	10 Jul 2007	Wikipedia logo displaying the name "Wikipedia" and its slogan: "The Free Encyclopedia" below it, in English	2007 −7
Herero Wikipedia		Herero	Latn	hz (closed)	0	0	29 Aug 2004	24 Jul 2007	Wikipedia logo displaying the name "Wikipedia" and its slogan: "The Free Encyclopedia" below it, in English	2007 −7
Sichuan Yi Wikipedia		Nuosu	Yiii	ii (closed)	3	1	Unknown date	29 Jul 2007	Wikipedia logo displaying the name "Wikipedia" and its slogan: "The Free Encyclopedia" below it, in English	2007 −7
Marshallese Wikipedia		Marshallese	Latn	mh (closed)	4	0	Unknown date	4 May 2008	Wikipedia logo displaying the name "Wikipedia" and its slogan: "The Free Encyclopedia" below it, in English	2008 −2
Afar Wikipedia		Afar	Latn	aa (closed)	0	0	Unknown date	10 May 2008	Wikipedia logo displaying the name "Wikipedia" and its slogan: "The Free Encyclopedia" below it, in English	2008 −2
Ndonga Wikipedia		Ovambo (Ndonga)	Latn	ng (closed)	8	1	Unknown date	10 Jan 2010	Wikipedia logo displaying the name "Wikipedia" and its slogan: "The Free Encyclopedia" below it, in English	2010 −1
Northern Luri Wikipedia		Northern Luri	Arab	lrc (closed)	1	1	16 Jun 2015	14 Jan 2021	Wikipedia logo displaying the name "Wikipedia" and its slogan: "The Free Encyclopedia" below it, in "Northern Luri"	2021 −1
Akan Wikipedia	Wikipidia Akan	Akan	Latn	ak (closed)	0	2	Unknown date	1 Apr 2023	Wikipedia logo displaying the name "Wikipedia" and its slogan: "The Free Encyclopedia" below it, in Akan	2023 −2
Nauruan Wikipedia	Wikipediya Naoero	Nauruan	Latn	na (closed)	0	2	Unknown date	1 May 2023	Wikipedia logo displaying the name "Wikipedia" and its slogan: "The Free Encyclopedia" below it, in "Nauruan"	2023 −2
Norfuk Wikipedia	Norfuk Wikkapedya	Norfuk	Latn	pih(closed)	0	2	Unknown date	19 Mar 2025	Wikipedia logo displaying the name "Wikipedia" and its slogan: "The Free Encyclopedia" below it, in "Norfuk"	2025 −3
Greenlandic Wikipedia	Kalaallisut Wikipedia	Greenlandic	Latn	kl (closed)	0	4	Unknown date	27 Sep 2025	Wikipedia logo displaying the name "Wikipedia" and its slogan: "The Free Encyclopedia" below it, in Greenlandic	2025 −3
Cree Wikipedia	ᐎᑭᐱᑎᔭ ᓀᐦᐃᔭᐍᐏᐣ (Wikipitiya nēhiyawēwin)	Cree	Cans	cr (closed)	0	7	Aug 2004 (unknown day)	27 Sep 2025	Wikipedia logo displaying the name "Wikipedia" and its slogan: "The Free Encyclopedia" below it, in Cree	2025 −3
Nostalgia Wikipedia	Nostalgia Wikipedia	English	Latn	nostalgia	0	0	Unknown [re]publication date	20 Dec 2001 (archive date)	Wikipedia logo displaying the name "Wikipedia" and its slogan: "The Free Encyclopedia" below it, in English	−
Wikipedia 10	Wikipedia 10	English	Latn	ten (closed)	0	0	Unknown date	Unknown date	Wikipedia logo displaying the name "Wikipedia" in a small size and the number "10" below it in a much bigger size, in English	−

=== Deleted Wikipedias but hosted elsewhere ===
The table below lists all the deleted language editions of Wikipedia sorted by the date of deletion.

Wikipedia editions
Wikipedia name in English	Wikipedia name in native language	Language	Script (ISO 15924 code)	Wikipedia code	Articles	Active users	Launch date	Closing date	Deletion	Moved to (old incubator link)	Logo
Klingon Wikipedia		Klingon	Latn	tlh (deleted)	0	0	Jun 2004 (unknown day)	Unknown date	Aug 2005 (unknown day)	klingon.fandom.com (Wp/tlh)	Wikipedia logo displaying the name "Wikipedia" and its slogan: "The Free Encyclopedia" below it, in Klingon
Siberian Wikipedia		fictitious "artificial Siberian language"	Cyrl	ru-sib (deleted)	0	0	1 Oct 2006	19 Sep 2007	16 Oct 2007	Archived version	Wikipedia logo displaying the name "Wikipedia" and its slogan: "The Free Encyclopedia" below it, in the fictitious "artificial Siberian language"
September 11 Wiki		English	Latn	sep11 (deleted)	0	0	2001 (unknown date)	2008 (unknown date)	Unknown date	Unknown host	
Quenya Wikipedia		Quenya	Latn	qya (deleted)	0	0	Unknown date	Unknown date	11 Mar 2010	Wikia:Neo-Quenya (Wp/qya)	
Moldovan Wikipedia		Romanian (Moldovan)	Cyrl	mo (deleted)	0	0	Unknown date	21 Nov 2006	23 Nov 2017	wpmo.fandom.com (Wp/mo)	Wikipedia logo displaying the name "Wikipedia" and its slogan: "The Free Encyclopedia" below it, in Moldovan

=== Test Wikipedias ===
The table below lists all test Wikipedias.

Wikipedia editions
Wikipedia name in English	Language	Script (ISO 15924 code)	Wikipedia code (linked to wp-main page)	Articles	Active users	Launch date	Logo
Test Wikipedia	English	Latn	test	0	0	Unknown date	Wikipedia logo displaying the name "Wikipedia" and the words "Test Wiki" below it, in red, in English
Test2 Wikipedia	English	Latn	test2	0	0	Unknown date	Wikipedia logo displaying the name "Wikipedia" and its slogan: "The Free Encyclopedia" below it, in English

== See also ==
- History of Wikipedia
- Meta:List of Wikipedias – current list, including also all closed, deleted and nonstandard language Wikipedias
- List of online encyclopedias
- Languages used on the internet
- Wikimedia Foundation § Wikimedia projects
