= Kurdish Wikipedias =

Kurdish-language editions of Wikipedia

Logo of the Kurmanji Wikipedia (left) and the Sorani Wikipedia (right)
- Website type: Internet encyclopedia project
- Available in: Kurdish (Kurmanji · Sorani)
- Owner: Wikimedia Foundation
- Creator: Kurdish wiki community
- Website: ku.wikipedia.org (Kurmanji) ckb.wikipedia.org (Sorani)
- Commercial: No
- Registration: Optional
- Launched: 7 January 2004; 22 years ago
- Content license: Creative Commons Attribution/ Share-Alike 4.0 (most text also dual-licensed under GFDL); Media licensing varies

There are two Kurdish editions of Wikipedia (Kurmanji Kurdish: Wîkîpediya kurdî, Sorani Kurdish: ویکیپیدیای کوردی), one written in Kurmanji (Northern Kurdish) and the other in Sorani (Central Kurdish).

The original one was founded in January 2004. As of November 2026, the Kurmanji Wikipedia has 92,216 articles and Sorani Wikipedia has 85,215 articles. There are also two other Wikipedia editions for Zazaki and Southern Kurdish with the latter still in the test phase.

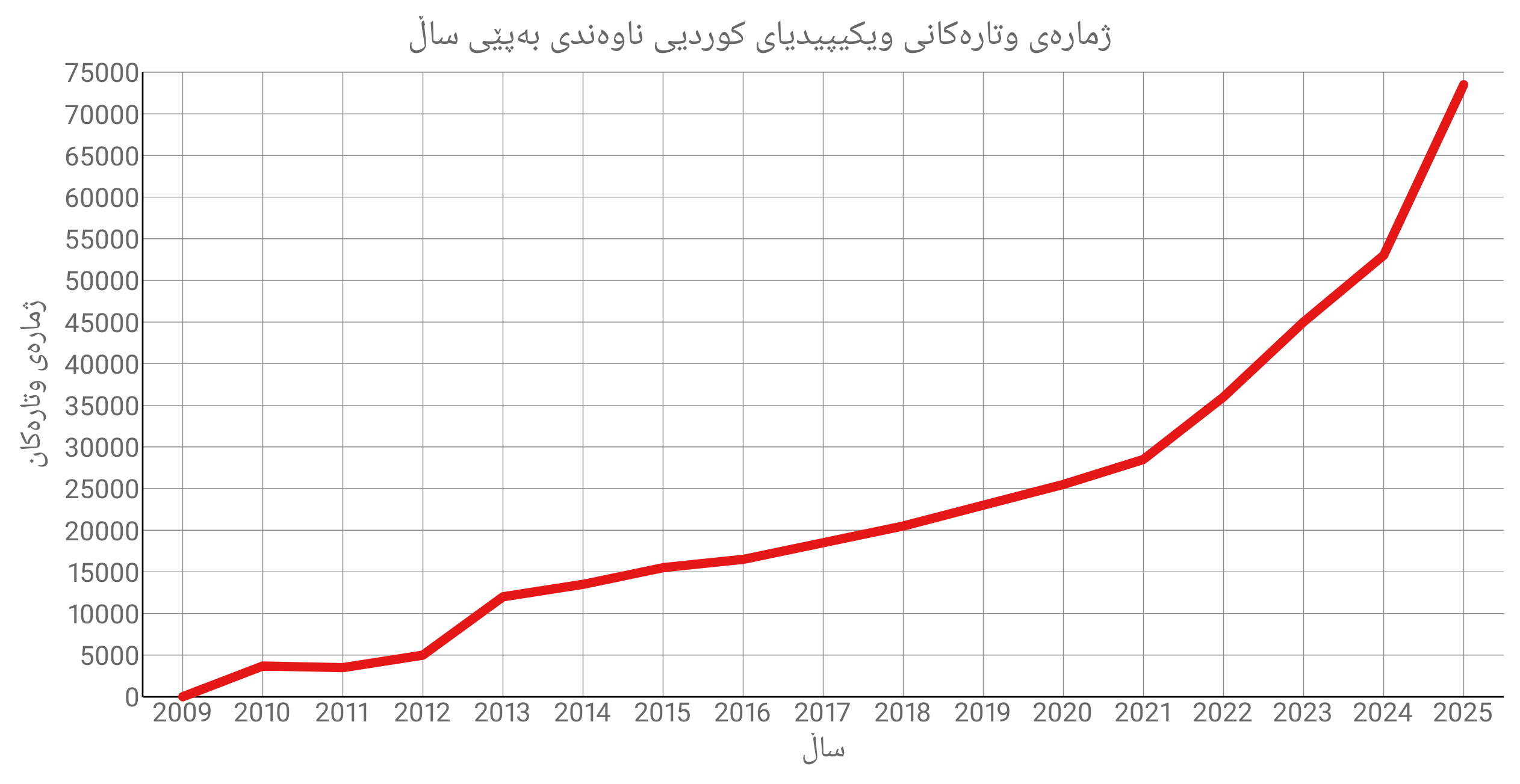
A diagram of the progression of articles number of the Sorani Kurdish Wikipedia, 2009–2025

== History ==
The Kurdish Wikipedia established on 7 January 2004, designed to contain articles in Kurmanji and Sorani at the same time. On 12 August 2009, Kurdish Wikipedia separated into two versions due to technical and linguistic issues. The old version (ku.) remained as Kurmanji Kurdish Wikipedia and a new version (ckb.) created for Sorani Kurdish Wikipedia.

== See also ==
- Zazaki Wikipedia

== Gallery ==
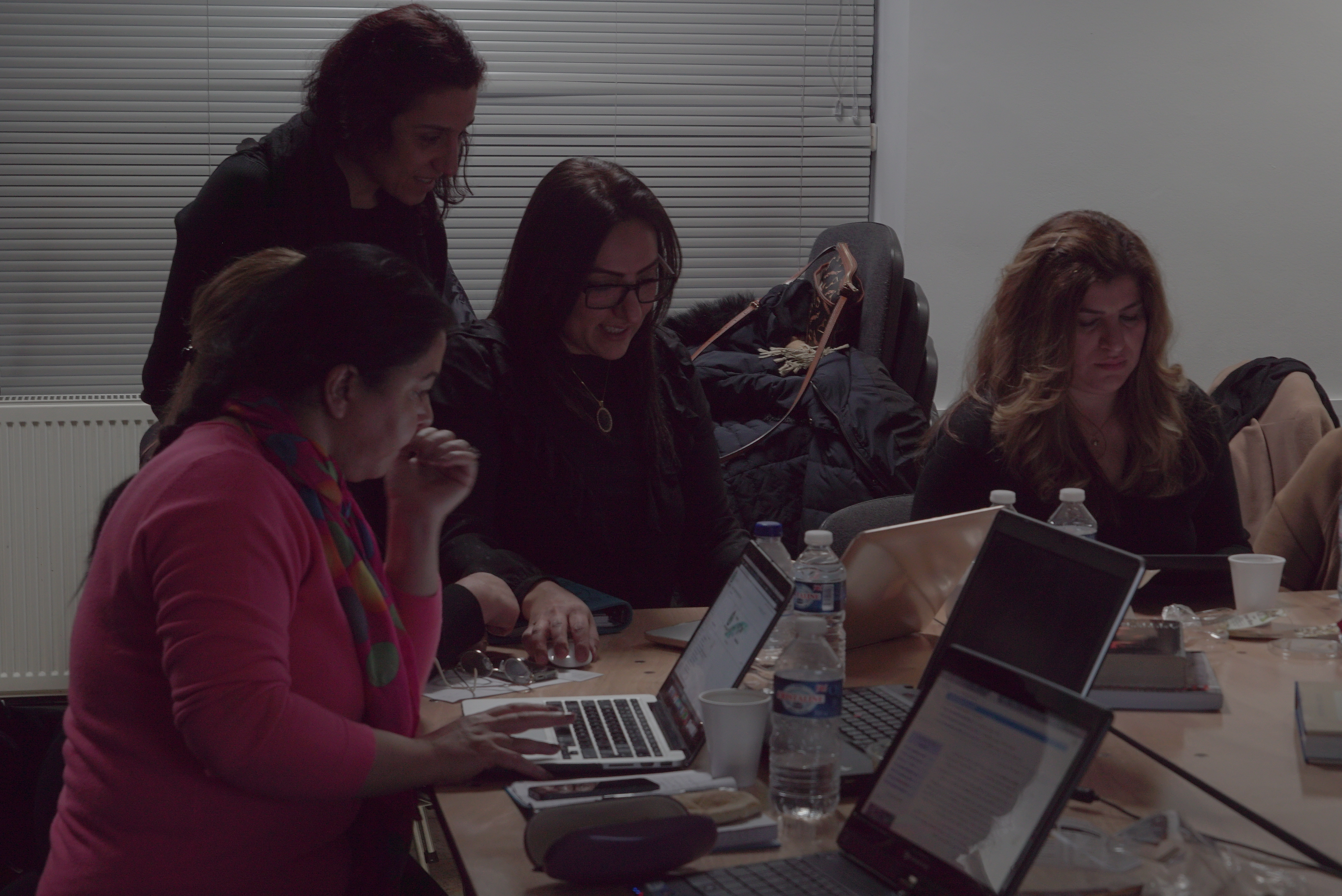
Kurdish women at a Wikimedia UK Wikipedia training event in London, December 2016

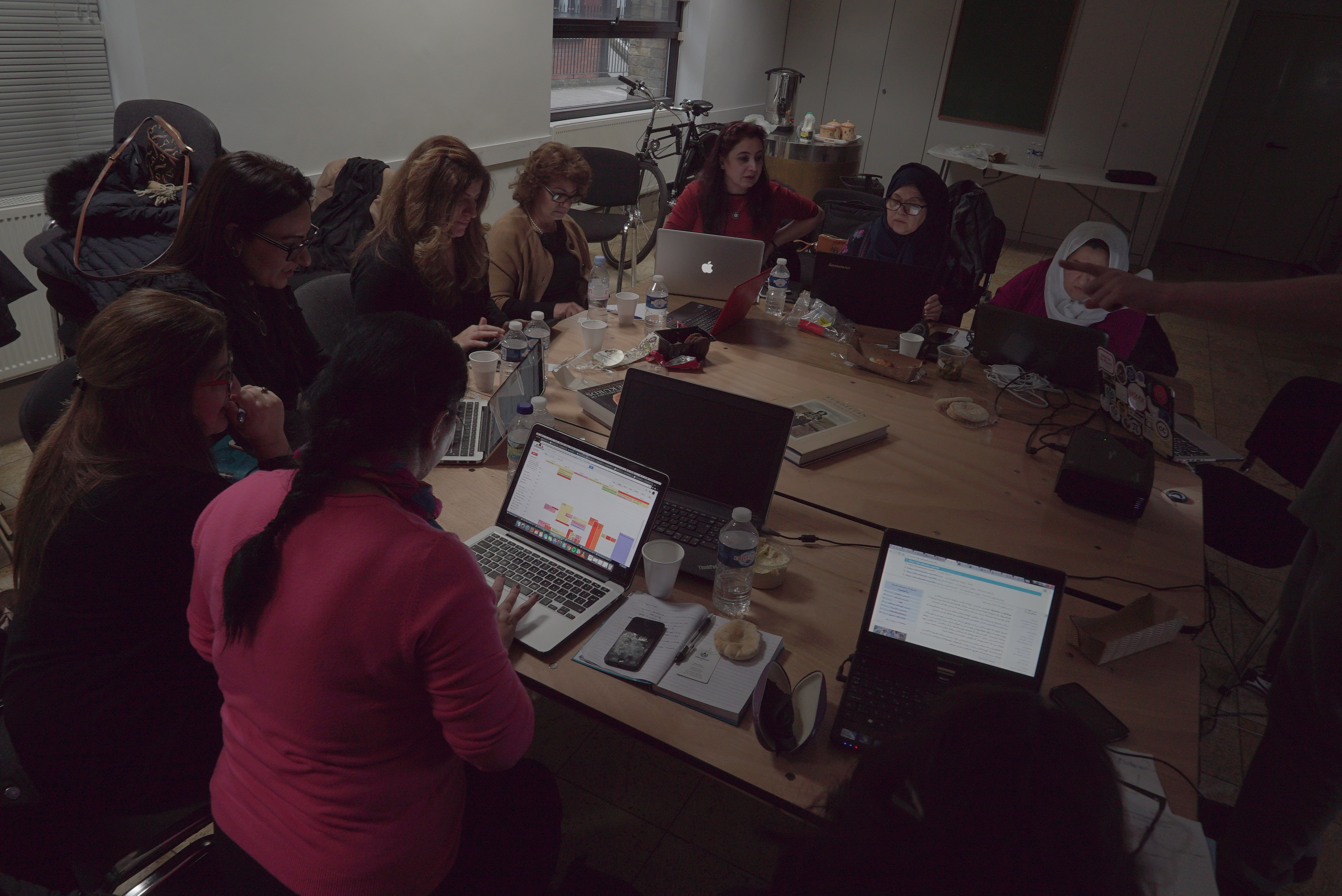

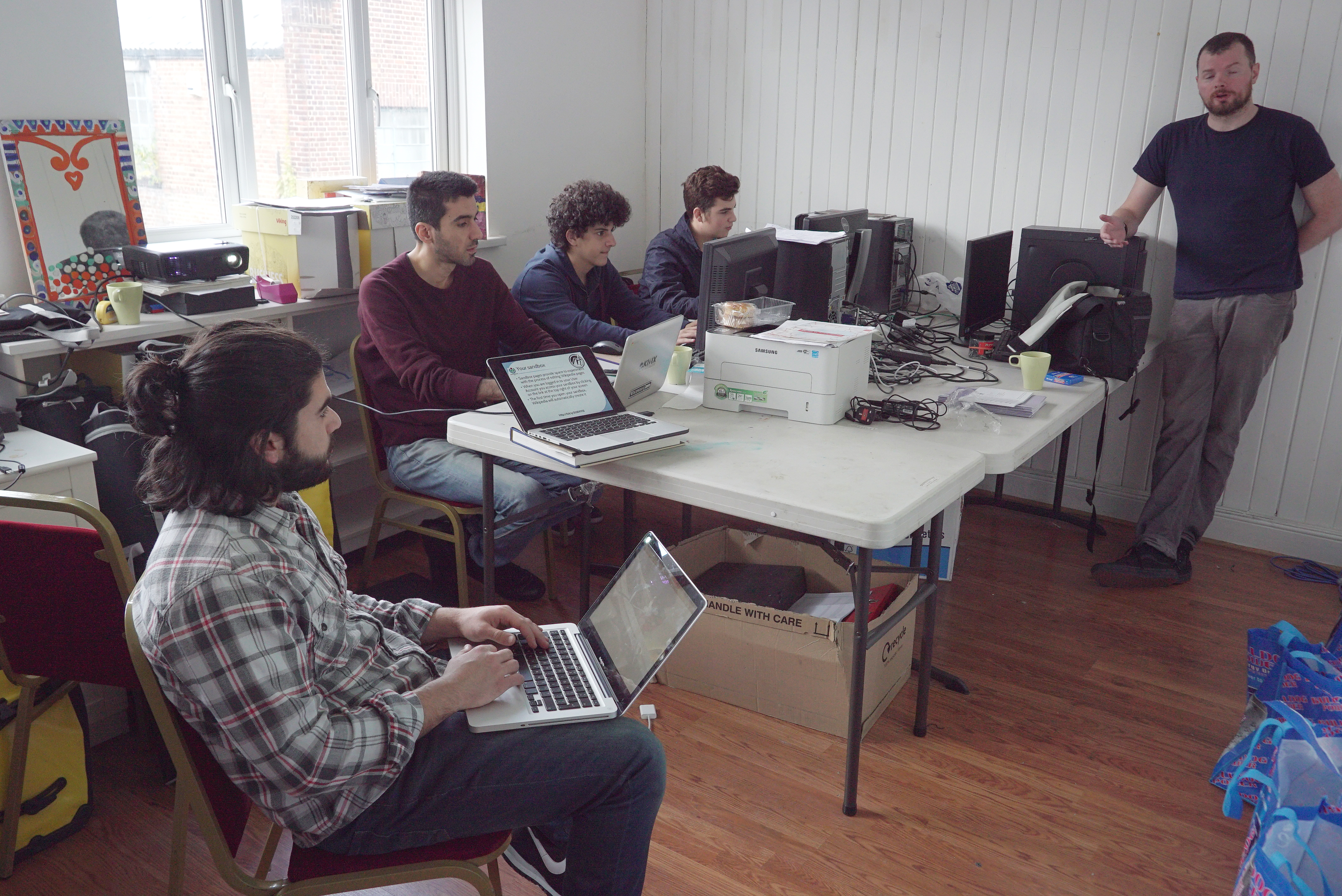
Kurdish Cultural Centre for Wikipedia training, October 2016
