= Ladin Wikipedia =

Ladin-language edition of Wikipedia

- Website type: Internet encyclopedia project
- Owner: Wikimedia Foundation
- Website: lld.wikipedia.org/
- Commercial: No
- Registration: Optional
- Launched: 17 August 2020
- Content license: Creative Commons Attribution/ Share-Alike 4.0 (most text also dual-licensed under GFDL); Media licensing varies

The Ladin Wikipedia (Ladin: Wikipedia ladina) is the Ladin-language edition of Wikipedia, a free, open-content encyclopedia. Started in 17 August 2020, it has 183,223 articles as of September 2026 and 41 active registered users. It reached 10,000 articles in January 2022 and 40,000 in June 2022.

The Ladin Wikipedia should not be confused with the Ladino Wikipedia (another name for Judaeo-Spanish Wikipedia) or the Latin Wikipedia.

== History ==
The Ladin Wikipedia started as a project on Wikimedia Incubator in 2005. Due to the existence of many dialects of the Ladin language and a weak spread in the usage of standard Ladin, it took a long time to become a definitive project of Wikipedia: about 15 years from the creation of the project and 3 years from the beginning of the participation of the institutions. It reached its first 1000 articles on 14 November 2019, while it was still a test wiki on Wikimedia Incubator.

== Features ==
The articles can be written in standard Ladin (Ladin Dolomitan) or in one of the five different dialects: Gherdëina, Badiot, Fascian, Fodom, Anpezan (the latter two are almost never used).

The Ladin Wikipedia has one of the highest article per speaker ratios with around five articles for each native speaker.
