= Classical Syriac Wikipedia =

Classical Syriac-language edition of Wikipedia

- Website type: Internet encyclopedia project
- Available in: Classical Syriac
- Owner: Wikimedia Foundation
- Website: arc.wikipedia.org
- Commercial: No
- Registration: Optional
- Launched: July 2004; 22 years ago
- Content license: Creative Commons Attribution/ Share-Alike 4.0 (most text also dual-licensed under GFDL); Media licensing varies

The Classical Syriac Wikipedia (Syriac: ܘܝܩܝܦܕܝܐ ܠܫܢܐ ܣܘܪܝܝܐ), also known as the Aramaic Wikipedia (Syriac: ܘܝܩܝܦܕܝܐ ܠܫܢܐ ܐܪܡܝܐ), is an edition of Wikipedia in Classical Syriac. It was officially created in July 2004.

As of 21 August 2026, the Classical Syriac edition of Wikipedia contains 1,920 articles and has 24,117 contributors, including 23 active contributors and 2 administrators.

== History ==
The Classical Syriac Wikipedia was officially launched in 2004, although it would not be until 2005 before a second article was published on the site. The Wikipedia was originally launched under the name of the Aramaic Wikipedia.

In 2010, it was decided to change the Wikipedia from being named the Aramaic Wikipedia to the Classical Syriac Wikipedia. This change was made in order to encompass a unifying language that all modern speakers of Neo-Aramaic dialects could understand and read. Although this change was officially decided on, the Wikipedia has yet to change its ISO 639-2 code from arc to syr.

== Statistics ==
The Classical Syriac Wikipedia is currently ranked 278th out of 348 active Wikipedia's, in terms of number of articles, as of 2026. On 21 October 2009, the Wikipedia achieved 1,000 total articles, and it was noted that the Wikipedia was increasing by an average of 63 articles per year. The Wikipedia is currently 7th out of 9 different Semitic language-Wikipedias, leading over the Tigrinya language, which itself leads over Tigre. The Classical Syriac Wikipedia accounts for a little over 0.05% of all Semitic language articles on Wikipedia.

- In September 2006, the Wikipedia achieved over 200 total articles.
- In August 2008, the Wikipedia achieved 500 total articles.
- In December 2011, the Wikipedia achieved 1.5K total articles.

== Gallery ==
Modern logo, using the Syriac Unicode block

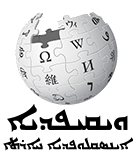
Former logo, using Classical ʾEsṭrangēlā

== See also ==
- List of Wikipedias
- Aramaic

== Bibliography ==
- Lih, Andrew (17 March 2009). The Wikipedia Revolution: How a Bunch of Nobodies Created the World's Greatest Encyclopedia. United States: Hyperion Books. p. 165. ISBN 978-1-4013-0371-6. OCLC 232977686.
