= Wolof Wikipedia =

Wolof-language edition of Wikipedia

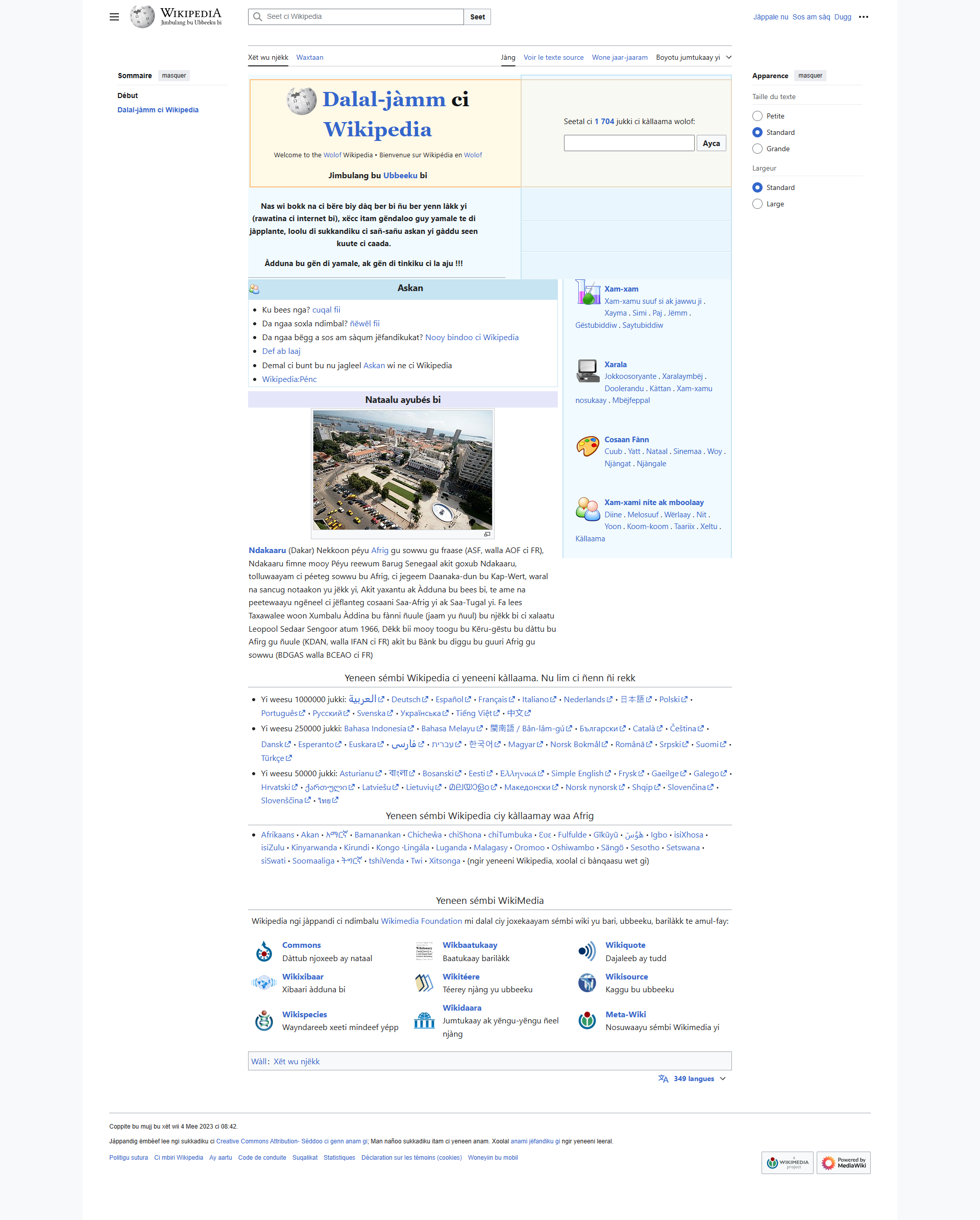
- Screenshot Main Page of the Wolof Wikipedia in November 2024
- Website type: Internet encyclopedia project
- Available in: Wolof language
- Headquarters: Miami, Florida
- Owner: Wikimedia Foundation
- Website: wo.wikipedia.org
- Commercial: No
- Registration: Optional
- Launched: 2005; 21 years ago
- Content license: Creative Commons Attribution/ Share-Alike 4.0 (most text also dual-licensed under GFDL); Media licensing varies

The Wolof Wikipedia is the edition of Wikipedia in the Wolof language. It currently has 1,743 articles.

The Wikipedia was started in the beginning of 2005, along with the Bambara Wikipedia and the Fula Wikipedia. Kasper Souren, a Dutchman who worked with Geekcorps, wrote in a report to an open source conference that until 2006 "not much happened" on the Wolof Wikipedia. Up until that year, many small articles with very little content were posted.

In April 2007, Ibrahima Fall (username Ibou), a Senegalese student living in Italy, began adding substantial content to the Wolof Wikipedia. It had 500 articles in November 2007, 543 articles in June 2008, and 1028 articles in August 2015.
