= Bambara Wikipedia =

Bambara-language version of Wikipedia

- Website type: Internet encyclopedia
- Owner: Wikimedia Foundation
- Website: bm.wikipedia.org
- Commercial: No
- Registration: Optional
- Launched: 2005; 21 years ago
- Content license: Creative Commons Attribution/ Share-Alike 4.0 (most text also dual-licensed under GFDL); Media licensing varies

The Bambara Wikipedia is the edition of Wikipedia in the Bambara language, spoken in Mali, Burkina Faso, and Senegal. This edition of Wikipedia contains 930 articles.

== History ==
The Wikipedia was started in the beginning of 2005, along with the Wolof Wikipedia and the Fula Wikipedia. Kasper Souren, a Dutchman who worked with Geekcorps, established this Wikipedia while working on a mission in Mali. In December 2007, the Bambara Wikipedia had 142 articles, and the Wikipedia in Fula had 28 articles. According to Souren, he was volunteering in Mali in 2005 when he first encountered the Bambara language.

Souren wrote in a report to an open source conference that a Geekcorps Mali volunteer had created a side project where a person who wrote for the Wikipedia received $1 U.S. per article. Souren went to Bamako and met people at a community center. He paid each person willing to write an article $1 U.S. The authors had no internet connections and no Wikipedia usernames. They wrote articles in Microsoft Word and gave the files to Souren. Souren uploaded each article and credited the authors. Souren wrote "I can’t understand 100 percent of what they wrote, but I could estimate that it was right. It is a Wikipedia anyway, so I hope they can correct it."

The total expenses of the project amounted to fewer than $100 U.S. In regards to the payment, Ndesanjo Macha, a Wikipedian who speaks Swahili, argued that it is unnecessary to pay editors for their efforts, and he believed he was speaking for everyone in Africa. Noam Cohen of The New York Times wrote "Most of the people who have heard about Mr. Souren's decision to pay for entries lauded his goal but questioned his tactics, saying that they undercut the Wikipedia spirit, and that, ultimately, a Bambara Wikipedia would work only if there was a voluntary community to support it." This project resulted in the partial translation of the interfaces of the Bambara and Fula Wikipedias and the creation of some articles for those Wikipedias. Souren wrote that after 2005, the Bambara and Fula Wikipedias had "only sparse activity". In December 2007, the Bambara Wikipedia had 142 articles, and the Wikipedia in Fula had 28 articles.

In 2013, Valentin Vydrin, lead creator of the "Bamana Reference Corpus (BRC)", wrote that "The Bambara Wikipedia counts a couple of hundred entries, most of them rudimentary and often written without any respect for the rules of orthography."
