= Magahi Wikipedia =

- Website type: Internet encyclopedia
- Available in: Magahi
- Owner: Wikimedia Foundation
- Website: mag.wikipedia.org
- Commercial: No
- Registration: Optional
- Users: 609.00 (2026)
- Launched: 18 June 2026; 4 months ago
- Current status: Active
- Content license: Creative Commons Attribution/ Share-Alike 4.0 (most text also dual-licensed under GFDL); Media licensing varies

The Magahi Wikipedia (Magahi: मगही विकिपीडिया) is the Magahi (also called Magadhi) language version of Wikipedia, run by the Wikimedia Foundation. The site was launched on June 18, 2026, and as of November 2026, it has 3,828 articles. Magahi today is written in the Devanagari script. It is an Indo-Aryan language spoken in eastern India. It is chiefly spoken in southern Bihar and northern Jharkhand. The language is a minority language in parts of West Bengal and Odisha in eastern India, and in the Terai region of Nepal.

== Users and editors ==
Magahi Wikipedia statistics
Number of user accounts	Number of articles	Number of files	Number of administrators
609	3828	0	1
