= Extremaduran Wikipedia =

Extremaduran-language edition of Wikipedia

- Website type: Internet encyclopedia project
- Available in: Extremaduran
- Owner: Wikimedia Foundation
- Website: ext.wikipedia.org
- Commercial: No
- Registration: Optional
- Launched: 27 January 2007; 19 years ago
- Content license: Creative Commons Attribution/ Share-Alike 4.0 (most text also dual-licensed under GFDL); Media licensing varies

The Extremaduran Wikipedia (Extremaduran: Güiquipedia n'estremeñu) or Güiquipedia (formerly Güiquipeya) is the Extremaduran-language edition of Wikipedia, a free, online encyclopedia. It has 4,278 articles and is ranked 234th in the Wikipedia list according to the number of articles.

== Controversy ==
Different media have criticized the Extremaduran version of Wikipedia. It is questioned that Extremaduran is not really a separate language, but instead a dialect of Asturian and Castilian, and that it does not have defined spelling rules, although the OSCEC (Monitoring and Coordination Body of Extremaduran and its Culture) has worked on the standardization of Extremaduran through dictionaries and normative grammar materials. The fact that the page only has three main contributors, the same who initiated the project, has also been the subject of controversy.
