= Crimean Tatar Wikipedia =

Crimean Tatar–language edition of Wikipedia

- The logo of Crimean Tatar Wikipedia (left/top) and the version for the Romanian standard (right/bottom), a globe featuring glyphs from several writing systems

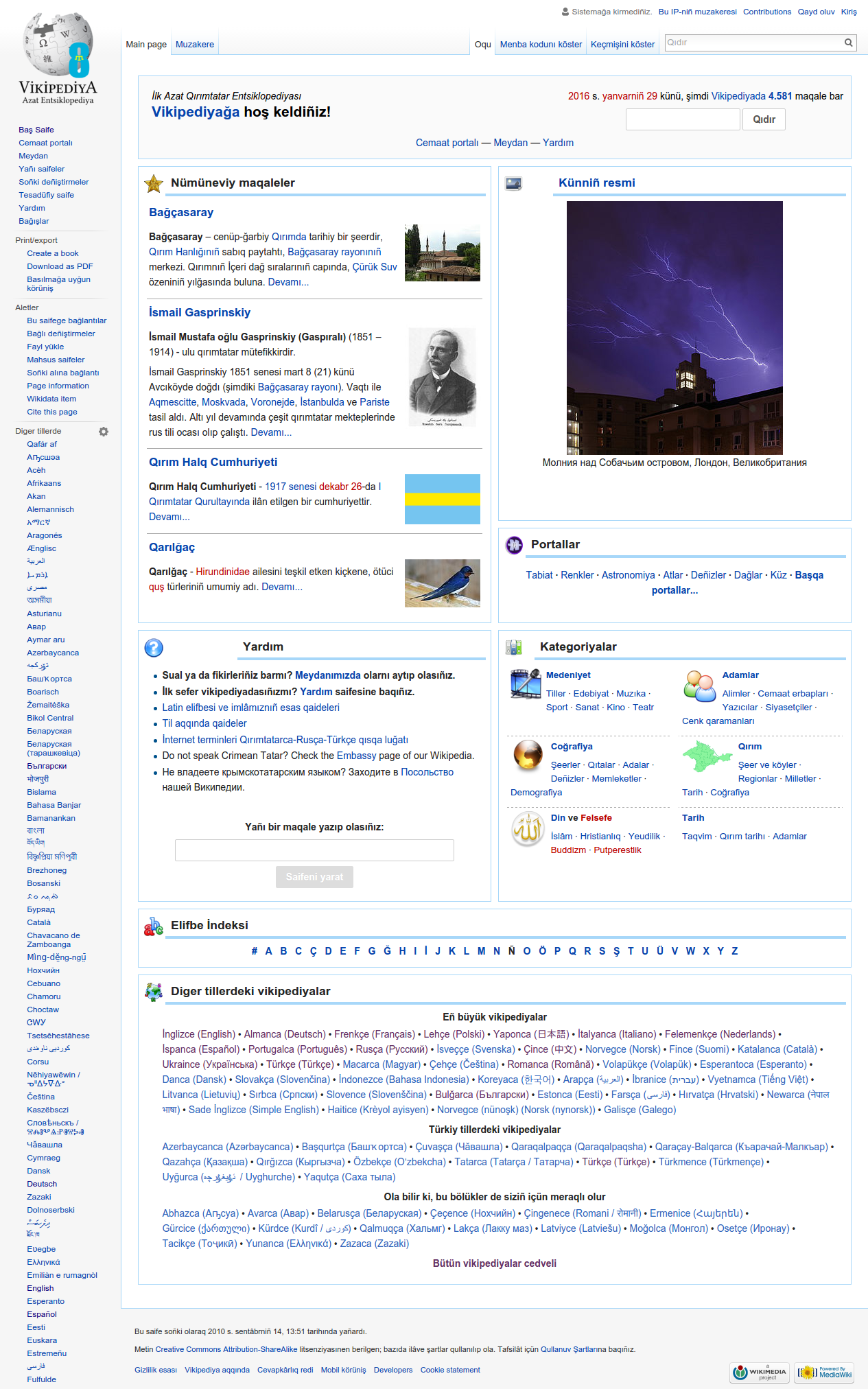
- Screenshot The homepage of the Crimean Tatar Wikipedia.
- Website type: Internet encyclopedia project
- Available in: Crimean Tatar
- Headquarters: Miami, Florida
- Owner: Wikimedia Foundation
- Website: crh.wikipedia.org
- Commercial: No
- Registration: Optional (but required to create articles)
- Users: 91,929
- Content license: Creative Commons Attribution/ Share-Alike 4.0 (most text also dual-licensed under GFDL); Media licensing varies

The Crimean Tatar Wikipedia (Crimean Tatar: Qırımtatarca Vikipediya, in Romanian standard: Kîrîm Tatarşa Wikipediya) is the Crimean Tatar language edition of the free online encyclopedia Wikipedia. Work began in 2006 when a test version in Crimean Tatar was set up as part of the Wikimedia Incubator. The Crimean Tatar Wikipedia was created on 12 January 2008. The Crimean Tatar Wikipedia supports also the Romanian standard of the language (Dobrujan Tatar).

== Statistics ==
Crimean Tatar
| Articles | 29,772 |
| Files | 0 |
| Edits | 246,013 |
| Users | 91,929 |
| Active users | 60 |
| Admins | 2 |

The encyclopedia reached several milestones over time, including 1,000 articles in 2009, 5,000 articles in 2016, and 10,000 articles in 2021. Due to the Russo-Ukrainian War, in 2022 alone, 5,000 new articles were added within six months. As of October 2026, Crimean Tatar Wikipedia has 29,772 articles. The main problem of the project is a lack of volunteers. The vast majority of edits are made by several volunteers, none of whom is a native speaker.

=== Milestones ===
- 12 January 2008 — 1st article
- 21 January 2008 — 557 articles
- 20 October 2009 — 1,000 articles
- 30 January 2010 — 1,405 articles
- 16 May 2014 — 4,035 articles
- June 2021 — 10,000 articles

== Links ==
- List of Wikipedias and their ranking by number of articles
- Wikipedia Statistics Crimean Tatar
- Wikimedia Traffic Analysis Report - Wikipedia Page Views Per Country
- Crimean Tatar Wikipedia (in Crimean Tatar)
- Crimean Tatar Wikipedia mobile version (in Crimean Tatar)
