= Zulu Wikipedia =

Zulu-language edition of Wikipedia

- Website type: Internet encyclopedia project
- Available in: Zulu
- Owner: Wikimedia Foundation
- Website: zu.wikipedia.org
- Commercial: No
- Registration: Optional
- Launched: 30 November 2003; 22 years ago
- Content license: Creative Commons Attribution/ Share-Alike 4.0 (most text also dual-licensed under GFDL); Media licensing varies

The Zulu Wikipedia is the Zulu-language edition of Wikipedia, a free, open-content encyclopedia. Started on 30 November 2003, it rose to 186 articles as of 13 May 2009, and to 766 on 25 April 2016, making it the 247th largest Wikipedia language edition (down from 221st in the previous date).

It has 12,732 articles as of September 2026 and 120 active registered users.

== History ==
Although it was the third African-language Wikipedia to reach 100 articles, progress has been slow, and it has been surpassed by numerous other African languages.

As Zulu is mostly mutually intelligible with Xhosa, both of which are Nguni languages, it is possible for articles in the Zulu edition to be easily translated into Xhosa for the Xhosa Wikipedia. Similar trans-wiki efforts have been made for Scandinavian-language editions, such as the Swedish, Norwegian, and Danish through Wikimedia's Skanwiki collaboration tool.

In January 2012, the Zulu Wikipedia was proposed for closing. The proposal was rejected in March 2012.

== See also ==
- Afrikaans Wikipedia
- Lingala Wikipedia
- Somali Wikipedia
- Swahili Wikipedia
- Tsonga Wikipedia
- Yoruba Wikipedia
