= History of Wikipedia =

Timeline of the history of Wikipedia

External videos
- Jimmy Wales: The birth of Wikipedia, 2005 TED (conference), 20 mins.

Raw data
The English edition of Wikipedia has grown to 7,267,950 articles.

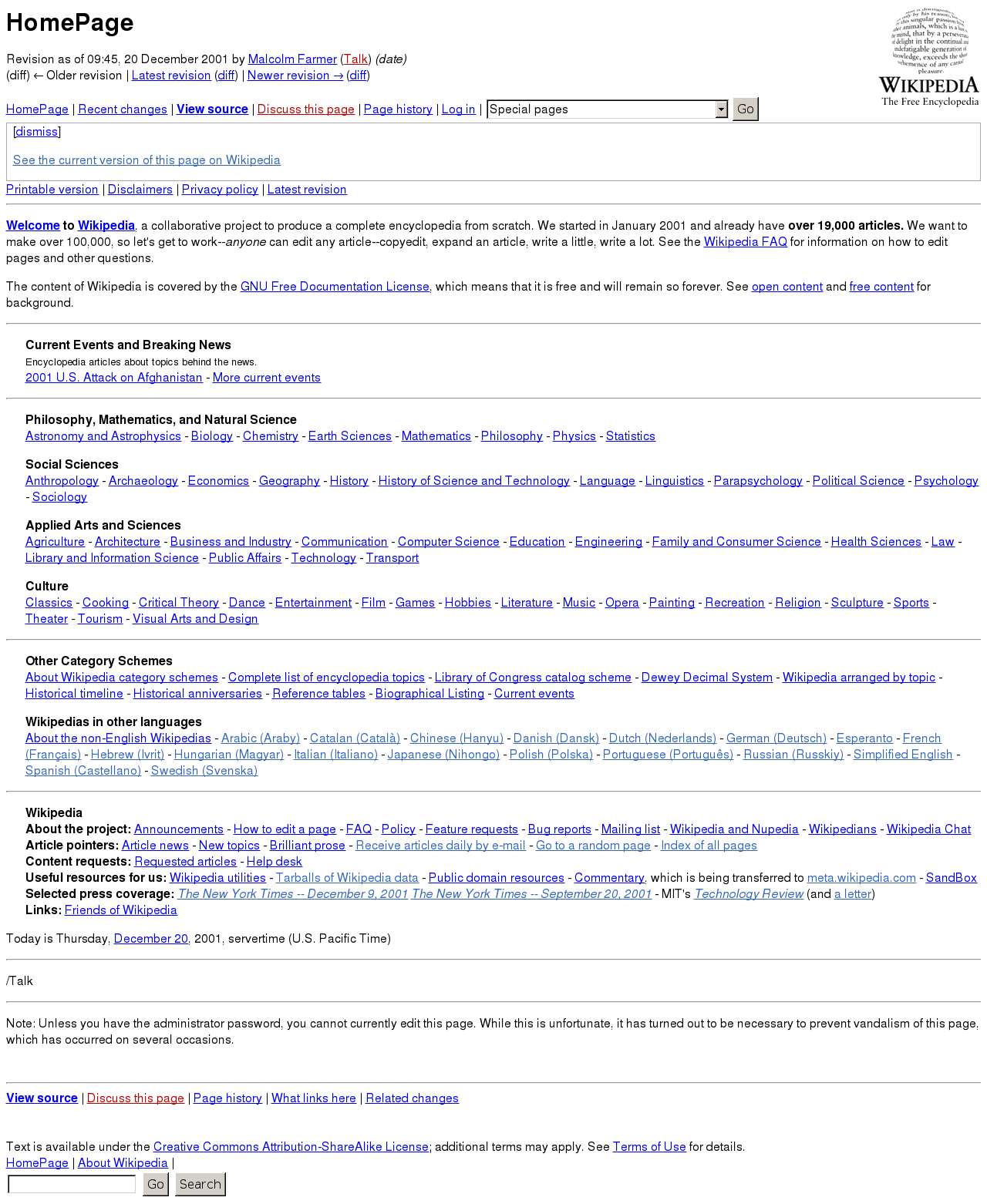
Wikipedia's main page (20 December 2001)

Wikipedia, a free-content online encyclopedia written and maintained by a community of volunteers known as Wikipedians, began with its first edit on 15 January 2001, two days after the domain was registered. It grew out of Nupedia, a more structured free encyclopedia, as a way to allow easier and faster drafting of articles and translations.

The technological and conceptual underpinnings of Wikipedia predate this; the earliest known proposal for an online encyclopedia was made by Rick Gates in 1993, and the concept of a free-as-in-freedom online encyclopedia (as distinct from mere open source) was proposed by Richard Stallman in 1998.

Stallman's concept specifically included the idea that no central organization should control editing. This contrasted with contemporary digital encyclopedias such as Microsoft Encarta and Encyclopædia Britannica. In 2001, the license for Nupedia was changed to GFDL, and Jimmy Wales and Larry Sanger launched Wikipedia as a complementary project, using an online wiki as a collaborative drafting tool.

While Wikipedia was initially imagined as a place to draft articles and ideas for eventual polishing in Nupedia, it quickly overtook its predecessor, becoming both draft space and home for the polished final product of a global project in hundreds of languages, inspiring a wide range of other online reference projects.

In 2014, Wikipedia had approximately 495 million monthly readers. In 2015, according to comScore, Wikipedia received over 115 million monthly unique visitors from the United States alone. In September 2018, the projects saw 15.5 billion monthly page views.

== Historical overview ==
=== Background ===
The concept of compiling the world's knowledge in a single location dates back to the ancient Library of Alexandria and Library of Pergamum, and there are ancient precursors of the idea of a comprehensive encyclopedia, such as Pliny the Elder's Naturalis historia, but the modern concept of a general-purpose, widely distributed, printed encyclopedia originates with Denis Diderot and the 18th-century French encyclopedists. The idea of using automated machinery beyond the printing press to build a more useful encyclopedia can be traced to Paul Otlet's 1934 book Traité de Documentation. Otlet also founded the Mundaneum, an institution dedicated to indexing the world's knowledge, in 1910. This concept of a machine-assisted encyclopedia was further expanded in H. G. Wells' book of essays World Brain (1938) and Vannevar Bush's future vision of the microfilm-based Memex in his essay "As We May Think" (1945). Another milestone was Ted Nelson's hypertext design Project Xanadu, which began in 1960.

The use of volunteers was integral in making and maintaining Wikipedia. However, even without the internet, huge complex projects of similar nature had made use of volunteers. Specifically, the creation of the Oxford English Dictionary was conceived with the speech at the London Library, on Guy Fawkes Day, 5 November 1857, by Richard Chenevix Trench. It took about 70 years to complete. Dr. Trench envisioned a grand new dictionary of every word in the English language, and to be used democratically and freely. According to author Simon Winchester, "The undertaking of the scheme, he said, was beyond the ability of any one man. To peruse all of English literature – and to comb the London and New York newspapers and the most literate of the magazines and journals – must be instead 'the combined action of many.' It would be necessary to recruit a team – moreover, a huge one – probably comprising hundreds and hundreds of unpaid amateurs, all of them working as volunteers."

Advances in information technology in the late 20th century led to changes in the form of encyclopedias. While previous encyclopedias, notably the Encyclopædia Britannica, were often book-based, Microsoft's Encarta, published in 1993, was available on CD-ROM and hyperlinked. The development of the World Wide Web led to many attempts to develop internet encyclopedia projects. An early proposal for an online encyclopedia was Interpedia in 1993 by Rick Gates; this project died before generating any encyclopedic content. Free software proponent Richard Stallman described the usefulness of a "Free Universal Encyclopedia and Learning Resource" in 1998. His published document outlined how to "ensure that progress continues towards this best and most natural outcome."

Wikipedia co-founder Jimmy Wales said that the concept of Wikipedia came when he was a graduate student at Indiana University, where he was impressed with the successes of the open-source movement and found Richard Stallman's Emacs Manifesto promoting free software and a sharing economy interesting. Wales also credits Austrian School economist Friedrich Hayek's essay, "The Use of Knowledge in Society," which he read as an undergraduate, as "central" to his thinking about "how to manage the Wikipedia project." The essay asserts that information is decentralized—that each individual only knows a small fraction of what is known collectively—and that as a result, decisions are best made by those with local knowledge, rather than by a central authority. At the time, Wales was studying finance and was intrigued by the incentives of the many people who contributed as volunteers toward creating free software, where many examples were having excellent results. According to The Economist, Wikipedia "has its roots in the techno-optimism that characterised the internet at the end of the 20th century. It held that ordinary people could use their computers as tools for liberation, education, and enlightenment."

=== Formulation of the concept ===
Wikipedia was initially conceived as a feeder project for the Wales-founded Nupedia, an earlier project to produce a free online encyclopedia, volunteered by Bomis, a web-advertising firm owned by Jimmy Wales, Tim Shell and Michael E. Davis. Nupedia was founded upon the use of qualified volunteer contributors and a considered multi-step peer review process. Despite its mailing list of over 2000 interested editors, and the presence of Sanger as full-time editor-in-chief, the production of content for Nupedia was extremely slow, with only 12 articles written during the first year.

The Nupedians discussed various ways to create content more rapidly. Wikis had been used elsewhere on the web to organize knowledge, and the idea of a wiki-based complement to Nupedia was seeded by a conversation between Sanger and Ben Kovitz, and by another between Wales and Jeremy Rosenfeld. Kovitz was a computer programmer and regular on Ward Cunningham's revolutionary wiki "the WikiWikiWeb". He explained to Sanger what wikis were, over a dinner on 2 January 2001. Wales stated in October 2001 that "Larry had the idea to use Wiki software" for people bored by Nupedia process, and later stated in December 2005 that Rosenfeld had introduced him to the wiki concept. Sanger thought a wiki would be a good platform to use, and proposed on the Nupedia mailing list that a wiki based upon UseModWiki (then v. 0.90) be set up as a "feeder" project for Nupedia. Under the subject "Let's make a wiki", he wrote:

No, this is not an indecent proposal. It's an idea to add a little feature to Nupedia. Jimmy Wales thinks that many people might find the idea objectionable, but I think not... As to Nupedia's use of a wiki, this is the ULTIMATE "open" and simple format for developing content. We have occasionally bandied about ideas for simpler, more open projects to either replace or supplement Nupedia. It seems to me wikis can be implemented practically instantly, need very little maintenance, and in general, are very low-risk. They're also a potentially great source of content. So there's little downside, as far as I can determine.

Wales set one up and put it online on Wednesday 10 January 2001, under the nupedia.com domain. This moved to a new wiki under the wikipedia.com domain on 15 January. On 17 January, the Free Software Foundation's (FSF) GNUPedia project went online, potentially competing with Nupedia, but within a few years the FSF encouraged people "to visit and contribute to [Wikipedia]" instead.

=== Founding of Wikipedia ===
There was some hesitation among editors about binding Nupedia too closely to a wiki-style workflow. After a Nupedia wiki was launched under nupedia.com on 10 January 2001, Wales proposed launching the new project under its own name, and Sanger proposed Wikipedia, framing it as "a supplementary project to Nupedia which operates entirely independently." A new wiki was launched at wikipedia.com on Monday 15 January 2001. The bandwidth and server (located in San Diego) used for these initial projects were donated by Bomis. Many former Bomis employees later contributed content to the encyclopedia: notably Tim Shell, co-founder and later CEO of Bomis, and programmer Jason Richey.

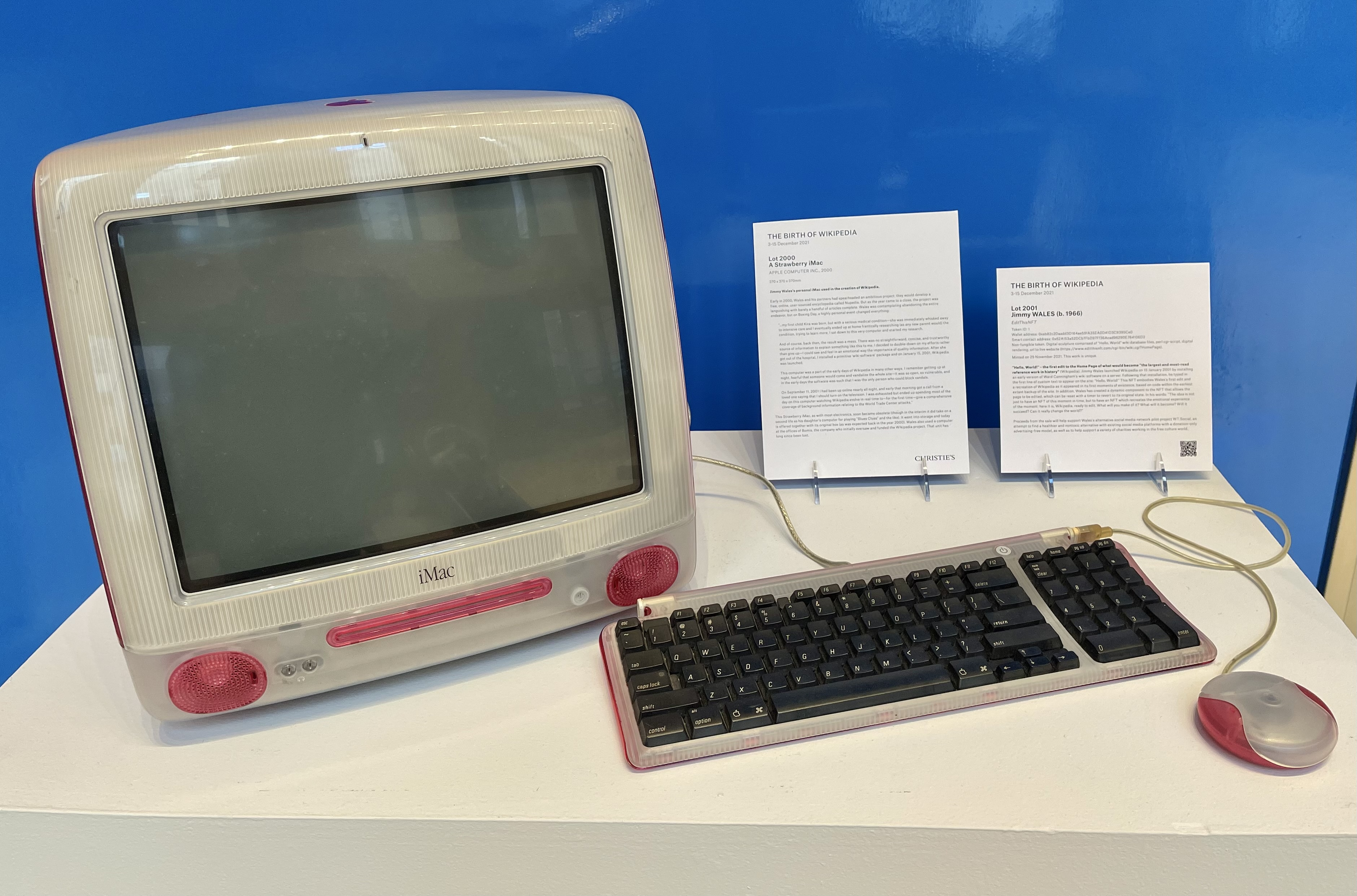
Jimmy Wales' iMac used to make the first edit to Wikipedia

Wales stated in December 2008 that he made Wikipedia's first edit, a test edit with the text "Hello, World!", but this may have been to an old version of Wikipedia which soon after was scrapped and replaced by a restart. The first recovered edit to Wikipedia.com was to the HomePage on 15 January 2001, reading "This is the new WikiPedia!"; it can be found here. The existence of the project was formally announced and an appeal for volunteers to engage in content creation was made to the Nupedia mailing list on 17 January 2001.

The project received many new participants after being mentioned on the Slashdot website in July 2001, having already earned two minor mentions in March 2001. It then received a prominent pointer to a story on the community-edited technology and culture website Kuro5hin on 25 July. Between these influxes of traffic, there had been a steady stream of traffic from other sources, especially Google, which alone sent hundreds of new visitors to the site every day. MIT Technology Review covered the project on 4 September 2001. Its first major mainstream media coverage was in The New York Times on 20 September 2001.

=== Divisions and internationalization ===
Early in Wikipedia's development, it began to expand internationally, with the creation of new namespaces, each with a distinct set of usernames. The first subdomain created for a non-English Wikipedia was deutsche.wikipedia.com (created on Friday 16 March 2001, 01:38 UTC), followed after a few hours by catalan.wikipedia.com (at 13:07 UTC). The Japanese Wikipedia, started as nihongo.wikipedia.com, was created around that period, and initially used only Romanized Japanese. For about two months Catalan was the one with the most articles in a non-English language, although statistics of that early period are imprecise.

The French Wikipedia was created on or around 11 May 2001, in a wave of new language versions that also included Chinese, Dutch, Esperanto, Hebrew, Italian, Portuguese, Russian, Spanish, and Swedish. These languages were soon joined by Arabic and Hungarian. In September 2001, an announcement pledged commitment to the multilingual provision of Wikipedia, notifying users of an upcoming roll-out of Wikipedias for all major languages, the establishment of core standards, and a push for the translation of core pages for the new wikis. At the end of that year, when international statistics first began to be logged, Afrikaans, Norwegian, and Serbian versions were announced.

In January 2002, 90% of all Wikipedia articles were in English. By January 2004, fewer than 50% were English, and this internationalization has continued to increase as the encyclopedia grows. As of 2014, about 85% of all Wikipedia articles were in non-English Wikipedia versions. As of 2023, the English and Simple English Wikipedias have 7 million articles between them, but roughly 90% of articles were in non-English Wikipedias.

=== Development of Wikipedia ===
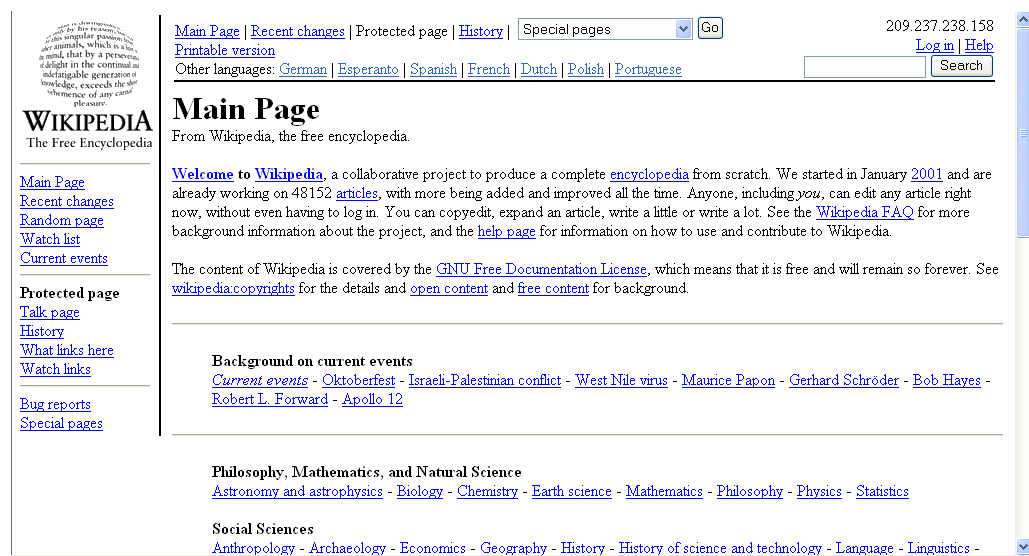
Wikipedia's main page (28 September 2002)

In March 2002, following the withdrawal of funding by Bomis during the dot-com bust, Sanger left both Nupedia and Wikipedia. By 2002, he and Wales differed in their views on how best to manage open encyclopedias. Both still supported the open-collaboration concept, but they disagreed on how to handle disruptive editors, specific roles for experts, and the best way to guide the project to success.

Wales went on to establish self-governance and bottom-up self-direction by editors on Wikipedia. He made it clear that he would not be involved in the community's day-to-day management, but would encourage it to learn to self-manage and find its own best approaches. As of 2007, Wales mostly restricted his role to occasional input on serious matters, executive activity, advocacy of knowledge, and encouragement of similar reference projects.

Sanger said he is an "inclusionist" and is open to almost anything, and proposed that experts still have a place in the Web 2.0 world. In 2006 he founded Citizendium, an open encyclopedia that used real names for contributors to reduce disruptive editing, and hoped to facilitate "gentle expert guidance" to increase the accuracy of its content. Decisions about article content were to be up to the community, but the site was to include a statement about "family-friendly content".

=== Past content of Wikipedia ===
Old, even obsolete, encyclopedia articles are highly valuable for historical research. For each Wikipedia article, past versions are accessible through the "View history" link at the top of the page. The full version history of all Wikipedia articles is also available for download as data dumps, in the form of compressed XML files.

In addition, the ZIM File Archive, at Internet Archive, contains past full snapshots of Wikipedia as well as article selections, in multiple languages, from different years. They can be opened with Kiwix software. Between 2007 and 2011, three CD/DVD versions (called Wikipedia Version 0.5, 0.7 and 0.8) containing a selection of articles from English Wikipedia were released. They became available as Kiwix ZIM files, both from the ZIM File Archive and from the Kiwix download site.

=== Evolution of logo ===
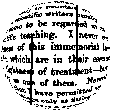
Founding – late 2001 (tentative)

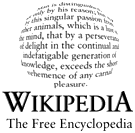
Late 2001 – 12 October 2003

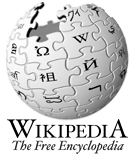
13 October 2003 – 13 May 2010

13 May 2010 – present

== Timeline ==
=== First decade: 2000–2009 ===
==== 2000 ====
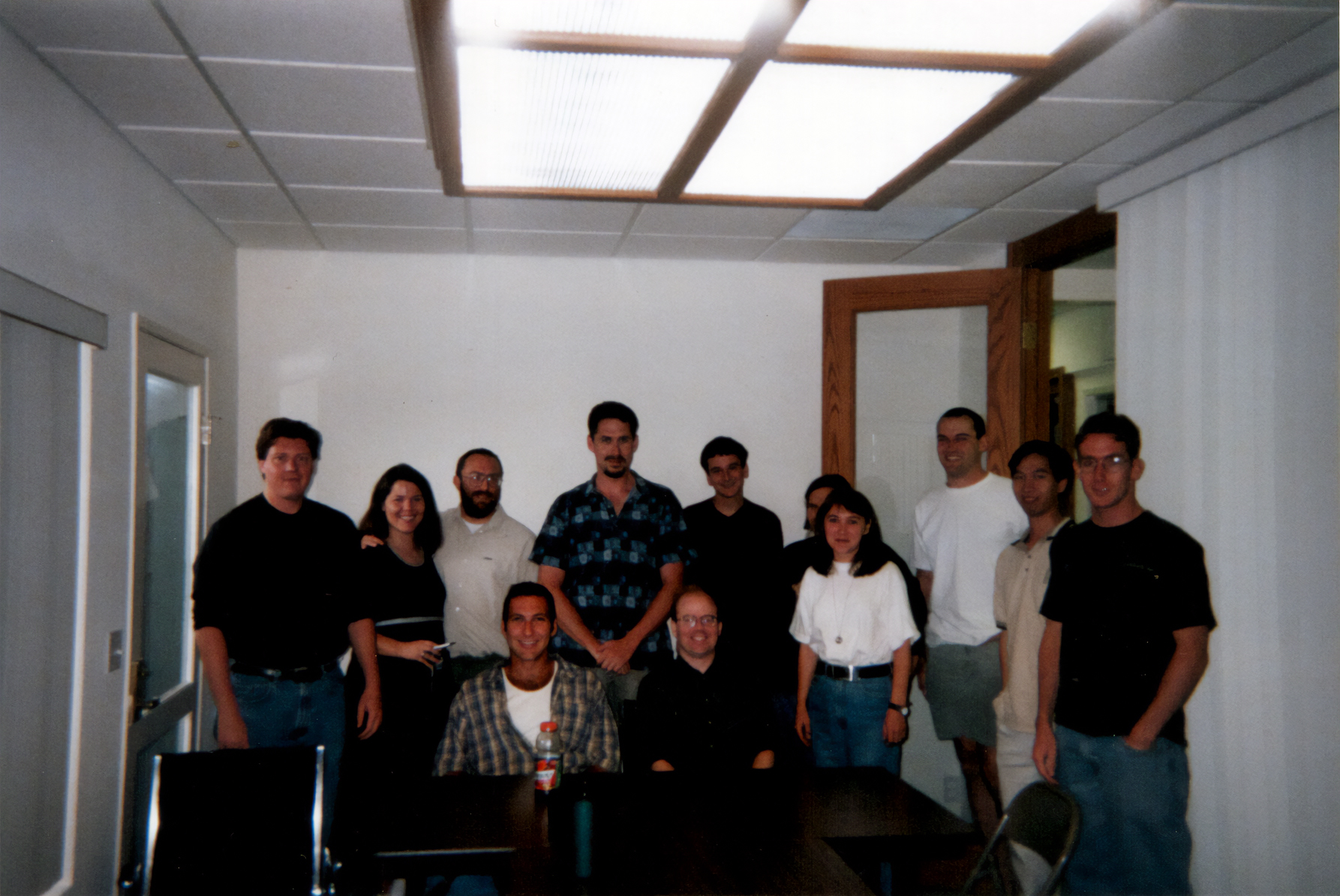
Bomis staff in mid-2000

In March 2000, the Nupedia project was started. Its intention was to publish articles written by experts which would be licensed as free content. Nupedia was founded by Wales, with Sanger as editor-in-chief, and funded by the web-advertising company Bomis.

==== 2001 ====
In January 2001, Wikipedia began as a side-project of Nupedia, to allow collaboration on articles prior to entering the peer-review process. The name was suggested by Sanger on 11 January 2001 as a portmanteau of the words wiki (Hawaiian for "quick") and encyclopedia. The wikipedia.com and wikipedia.org domain names were registered on 12 and 13 January, respectively, with wikipedia.org being brought online on the same day. The project formally opened on 15 January ("Wikipedia Day"), with the first international Wikipedias – the German, Catalan, French, Swedish, and Italian editions – being created between March and May. The "neutral point of view" (NPOV) policy was officially formulated at this time, and Wikipedia's first slashdotter wave arrived on 26 July. The first media report about Wikipedia appeared in August 2001 in the newspaper Wales on Sunday.

The September 11 attacks spurred the appearance of breaking news stories on the homepage, as well as information boxes linking related articles. At the time, approximately 100 articles related to 9/11 had been created. After the September 11 attacks, a link to the Wikipedia article on the attacks appeared on the Yahoo! home page, resulting in a spike in traffic.

==== 2002 ====
2002 saw the reduction of funding for Wikipedia from Bomis and the departure of Sanger. A fork of the Spanish Wikipedia took place, with the establishment of the Enciclopedia Libre. Jimmy Wales confirmed that Wikipedia would never run commercial advertising. The first portable MediaWiki software went live on 25 January. Bots were introduced. The first sister project (Wiktionary) and first formal Manual of Style were launched. Close to 200 contributors were editing Wikipedia daily.

==== 2003 ====
Wikipedia's main page (August 2003)

The English Wikipedia passed 100,000 articles in 2003, while the next largest edition, the German Wikipedia, passed 10,000. The Wikimedia Foundation was established. Wikipedia adopted its jigsaw world logo. Mathematical formulae using TeX were reintroduced to the website. The first Wikipedian social meeting took place in Munich, Germany, in October. The basic principles of English Wikipedia's Arbitration system and committee ("ArbCom") were developed. Wikisource was created as a separate project on 24 November 2003, to host free textual sources as its aim in multiple languages and translations.

==== 2004 ====
The worldwide Wikipedia article pool continued to grow rapidly in 2004, doubling in size in 12 months, from under 500,000 articles in late 2003 to over 1 million in over 100 languages by the end of 2004. The English Wikipedia accounted for just under half of these articles. The website's server farms were moved from California to Florida. Categories and CSS style configuration sheets were introduced. The first attempt to block Wikipedia occurred, with the website being blocked in China for two weeks in June. Formal elections began for a board for the Foundation, and an Arbitration Committee on English Wikipedia. The first national chapter of the Foundation, Wikimedia Deutschland, was recognized. The first social meeting in the United States took place in Boston, in July. Wikimedia Commons was created on 7 September 2004 to host media files for Wikipedia in all languages.

Bourgeois v. Peters, (11th Cir. 2004), a court case decided by the United States Court of Appeals for the Eleventh Circuit was one of the earliest court opinions to cite and quote Wikipedia. It stated: "We also reject the notion that the Department of Homeland Security's threat advisory level somehow justifies these searches. Although the threat level was 'elevated' at the time of the protest, 'to date, the threat level has stood at yellow (elevated) for the majority of its time in existence. It has been raised to orange (high) six times.'"

On 29 May, Wikipedia changed its default skin from Standard to MonoBook, the interface that remained the default for Wikimedia Foundation websites until 2010.

==== 2005 ====
In 2005, Wikipedia became the most popular reference website on the Internet, according to Hitwise, with English Wikipedia alone exceeding 750,000 articles. Wikipedia's first multilingual and subject portals were established in 2005. A formal fundraiser held in the first quarter of the year raised almost US$100,000 for system upgrades to handle growing demand. China again blocked Wikipedia in October 2005.

The first major Wikipedia scandal, the Seigenthaler incident, occurred in 2005 when a well-known figure was found to have a vandalized biography that had gone unnoticed for months. In the wake of this and other concerns, the first policy and system changes specifically designed to counter this form of abuse were established. These included a new Checkuser privilege policy update to assist in sock puppetry investigations, a new feature called semi-protection, a more strict policy on biographies of living people, and the tagging of such articles for stricter review. A restriction of new article creation to registered users was only put into place in December 2005 in English Wikipedia.

Wikimania 2005, the first Wikimania conference, was held from 4 to 8 August 2005 at the Haus der Jugend in Frankfurt, attracting about 380 attendees.

Wikimania – the Wikimentary, a documentary about Wikimania 2005, featuring Jimmy Wales and Ward Cunningham

==== 2006 ====
The English Wikipedia gained its one-millionth article, Jordanhill railway station, on March 1, 2006. The first approved Wikipedia article selection was made freely available to download, and "Wikipedia" became registered as a trademark of the Wikimedia Foundation. The congressional aides biography scandals – multiple incidents in which congressional staffers and a campaign manager were caught trying to covertly alter Wikipedia biographies – came to public attention, leading to the resignation of the campaign manager. Nonetheless, Wikipedia was rated as one of the top five global brands of 2006.

Jimmy Wales indicated at Wikimania 2006 that Wikipedia had achieved sufficient volume and called for an emphasis on quality, perhaps best expressed in the call for 100,000 feature-quality articles. A new privilege, "oversight", was created, allowing specific versions of archived pages with unacceptable content to be marked as non-viewable. Semi-protection against anonymous vandalism, introduced in 2005, proved more popular than expected, with over 1,000 pages being semi-protected at any given time in 2006.

==== 2007 ====
Wikipedia continued to grow rapidly in 2007, possessing over 5 million registered editor accounts by 13 August. The 250 language editions of Wikipedia contained a combined total of 7.5 million articles, totalling 1.74 billion words, by 13 August. The English Wikipedia gained articles at a steady rate of 1,700 a day, with the wikipedia.org domain name ranked the 10th-busiest in the world. Wikipedia continued to garner visibility in the press – the Essjay controversy broke out when a prominent member of Wikipedia was found to have lied about his credentials. Citizendium, a competing online encyclopedia, launched publicly. A new trend developed in Wikipedia, with the encyclopedia addressing people whose notability stemmed from being a participant in a news story by adding a redirect from their name to the larger story, rather than creating a distinct biographical article.

On 9 September 2007, the English Wikipedia gained its two-millionth article, El Hormiguero. There was some controversy in late 2007 when the Volapük Wikipedia jumped from 797 to over 112,000 articles, briefly becoming the 15th-largest Wikipedia edition, due to automated stub generation by an enthusiast for the Volapük constructed language. According to the MIT Technology Review, the number of regularly active editors on the English-language Wikipedia peaked in 2007 at more than 51,000, and has since been declining. In April 2007, Wikipedia Version 0.5 article selection release was published.

==== 2008 ====
Various WikiProjects in many areas continued to expand and refine article contents within their scope. In April 2008, the 10-millionth Wikipedia article was created, and by the end of the year the English Wikipedia exceeded 2.5 million articles.

==== 2009 ====
On 25 June 2009 at 22:15 UTC, following the death of Michael Jackson, the website temporarily crashed. The Wikimedia Foundation reported nearly a million visitors to Jackson's biography within one hour, probably the most visitors in a one-hour period to any article in Wikipedia's history. By late August 2009, the number of articles in all Wikipedia editions had exceeded 14 million. The three-millionth article on the English Wikipedia, Beate Eriksen, was created on 17 August 2009 at 04:05 UTC. On 27 December 2009, the German Wikipedia exceeded one million articles, becoming the second edition after the English Wikipedia to do so. A TIME article listed Wikipedia among 2009's best websites. Wikipedia content became licensed under a Creative Commons Attribution-ShareAlike license in 2009.

=== Second decade: 2010–2019 ===
==== 2010 ====
On 24 March, the European Wikipedia servers went offline due to an overheating problem. Failover to servers in Florida turned out to be broken, causing DNS resolution for Wikipedia to fail across the world. The problem was resolved quickly, but due to DNS caching effects, some areas were slower to regain access to Wikipedia than others.

On 13 May, the site released a new interface. New features included an updated logo, new navigation tools, and a link wizard. However, the classic interface remained available for those who wished to use it. On 12 December, the English Wikipedia passed the 3.5-million-article mark, while the French Wikipedia's millionth article was created on 21 September. The 1-billionth Wikimedia project edit was performed on 16 April. In early 2010, Wikipedia Version 0.7 article selection release was published.

==== 2011 ====
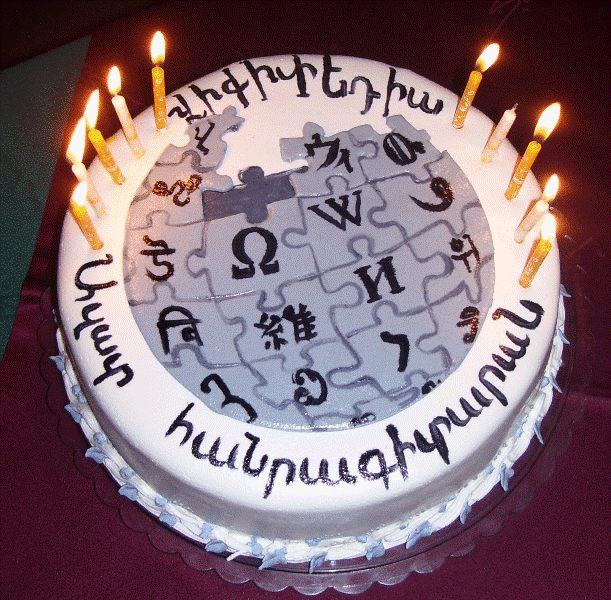
One of several cakes made to celebrate Wikipedia's 10th anniversary in 2011

Wikipedia and its users held many celebrations worldwide to commemorate the site's 10th anniversary on 15 January. The site began efforts to expand its growth in India, holding its first Indian conference in Mumbai in November 2011. The English Wikipedia passed the 3.6-million-article mark on 2 April, and reached 3.8 million articles on 18 November. On 7 November 2011, the German Wikipedia exceeded 100 million page edits, becoming the second language edition to do so after the English edition, which attained 500 million page edits on 24 November 2011. The Dutch Wikipedia exceeded 1 million articles on 17 December 2011, becoming the fourth Wikipedia edition to do so.

On 3 March 2011, Wikipedia Version 0.8 article selection release was published. The "Wikimania 2011 – Haifa, Israel" stamp was issued by Israel Post on 2 August 2011. This was the first-ever stamp dedicated to a Wikimedia-related project. Between 4 and 6 October 2011, the Italian Wikipedia became intentionally inaccessible in protest against the Italian Parliament's proposed DDL intercettazioni law, which, if approved, would allow any person to force websites to remove information that is perceived as untrue or offensive, without the need to provide evidence. Also in October 2011, Wikimedia announced the launch of Wikipedia Zero, an initiative to enable free mobile access to Wikipedia in developing countries through partnerships with mobile operators.

==== 2012 ====
The staff at the Wikimedia Foundation the moment the SOPA blackout happened

On 16 January, Wikipedia co-founder Jimmy Wales announced that the English Wikipedia would shut down for 24 hours on 18 January as part of a protest meant to call public attention to the proposed Stop Online Piracy Act and PROTECT IP Act, two anti-piracy laws under debate in the United States Congress. Calling the blackout a "community decision", Wales and other opponents of the laws believed that they would endanger free speech and online innovation. A similar blackout was staged on 10 July by the Russian Wikipedia, in protest against a proposed Russian internet regulation law.

In late March 2012, the Wikimedia Deutschland announced Wikidata, a universal platform for sharing data between all Wikipedia language editions. The US$1.7-million Wikidata project was partly funded by Google, the Gordon and Betty Moore Foundation, and the Allen Institute for Artificial Intelligence. Wikimedia Deutschland assumed responsibility for the first phase of Wikidata, and initially planned to make the platform available to editors by December 2012. Wikidata's first phase became fully operational in March 2013.

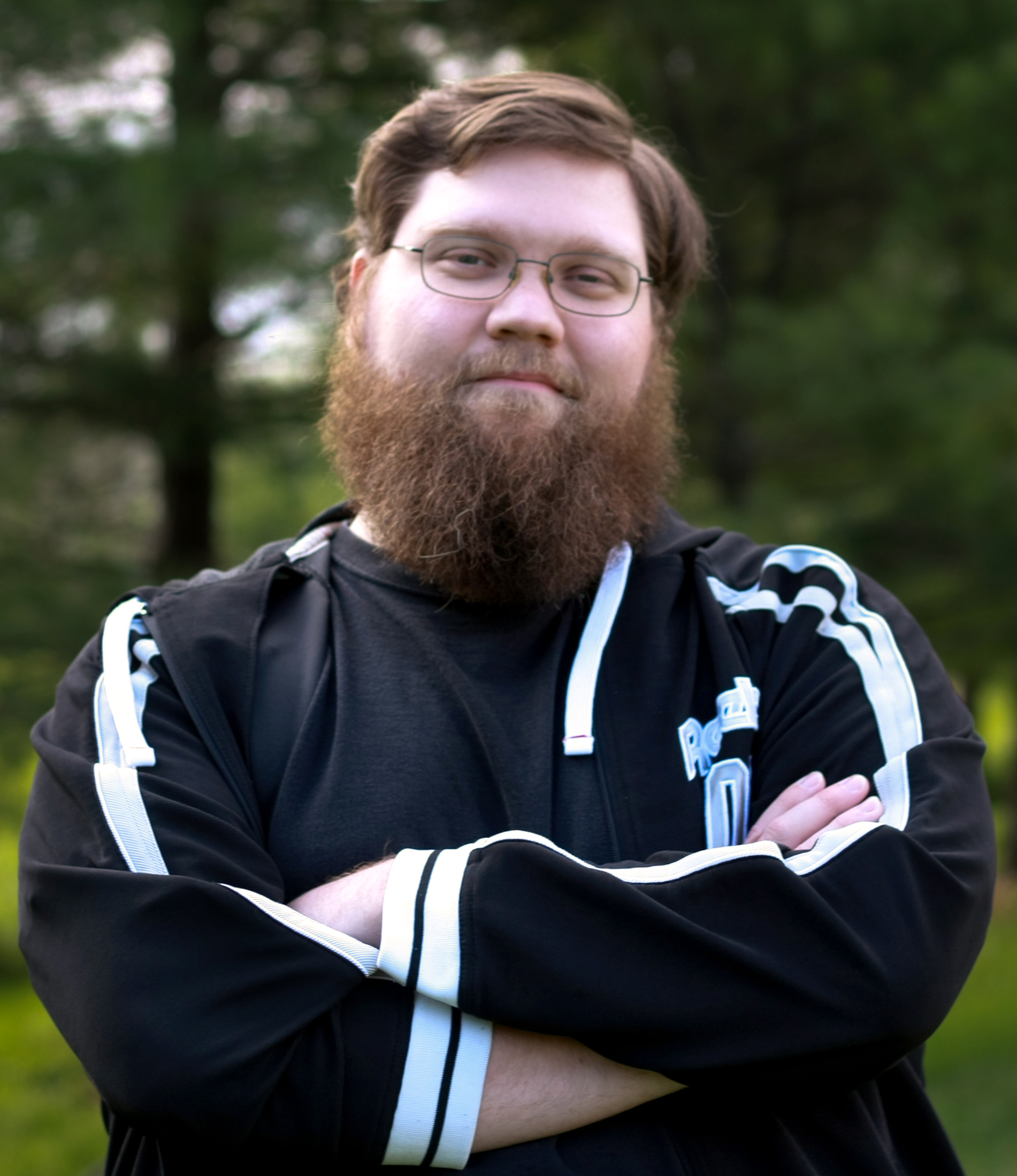
Justin Knapp

In April 2012, Justin Knapp became the first single contributor to make over one million edits to Wikipedia. Jimmy Wales congratulated Knapp for his work and presented him with the site's Special Barnstar medal and the Golden Wiki award for his achievement. Wales also declared that 20 April would be "Justin Knapp Day".

On 13 July 2012, the English Wikipedia gained its 4-millionth article, Izbat al-Burj. In October 2012, historian and Wikipedia editor Richard J. Jensen opined that the English Wikipedia was "nearing completion", noting that the number of regularly active editors had fallen significantly since 2007, despite Wikipedia's rapid growth in article count and readership. According to Alexa Internet, Wikipedia was the world's sixth-most-popular website as of November 2012. Dow Jones ranked Wikipedia fifth worldwide as of December 2012.

==== 2013 ====
On 22 January 2013, the Italian Wikipedia became the fifth language edition of Wikipedia to exceed 1 million articles, while the Russian and Spanish Wikipedias gained their millionth articles on 11 and 16 May respectively. On 15 July the Swedish and on 24 September the Polish Wikipedias gained their millionth articles, becoming the eighth and ninth Wikipedia editions to do so. On 27 January, the main belt asteroid 274301 was officially renamed "Wikipedia" by the Committee for Small Body Nomenclature.

The first phase of the Wikidata database, automatically providing interlanguage links and other data, became available for all language editions in March 2013. In April 2013, the French secret service was accused of attempting to censor Wikipedia by threatening a Wikipedia volunteer with arrest unless "classified information" about a military radio station was deleted.

Presentation about the Wikipedia VisualEditor

In July, the VisualEditor editing system was launched, forming the first stage of an effort to allow articles to be edited with a word processor-like interface instead of using wiki markup. An editor specifically designed for smartphones and other mobile devices was also launched.

==== 2014 ====
Video review of Wikipedia content in 2014, encouraging viewers to edit Wikipedia

In February 2014, a project to make a print edition of the English Wikipedia, consisting of 1,000 volumes and over 1,100,000 pages, was launched by German Wikipedia contributors. The project sought funding through Indiegogo, and was intended to honor the contributions of Wikipedia's editors. On 22 October 2014, the first monument to Wikipedia was unveiled in the Polish town of Slubice.

On 8 June, 15 June, and 16 July 2014, the Waray Wikipedia, the Vietnamese Wikipedia and the Cebuano Wikipedia each exceeded the one million article mark. They were the tenth, eleventh and twelfth Wikipedias to reach that milestone. Despite having very few active users, the Waray and Cebuano Wikipedias had a high number of automatically generated articles created by bots.

==== 2015 ====
Video marking English Wikipedia's milestone of five million articles on 1 November 2015

In mid-2015, Wikipedia was the world's seventh-most-popular website according to Alexa Internet, down one place from the position it held in November 2012. At the start of 2015, Wikipedia remained the largest general-knowledge encyclopedia online, with a combined total of over 36 million mainspace articles across all 291 language editions. On average, Wikipedia receives a total of 10 billion global pageviews from around 495 million unique visitors every month, including 85 million visitors from the United States alone, where it is the sixth-most-popular site.

Artist Michael Mandiberg talks about Print Wikipedia.

Print Wikipedia was an art project by Michael Mandiberg that created the ability to print 7473 volumes of Wikipedia as it existed on 7 April 2015. Each volume has 700 pages and only 110 were printed by the artist. On 1 November 2015, the English Wikipedia reached 5,000,000 articles with the creation of an article on Persoonia terminalis, a type of shrub.

On October 23, Wikipedia received the Princess of Asturias Award for International Cooperation.

==== 2016 ====
On 19 January 2016, the Japanese Wikipedia exceeded the one million article mark, becoming the thirteenth Wikipedia to reach that milestone. The millionth article was of Wave 224, a World War II submarine of the Imperial Japanese Navy. In mid-2016, Wikipedia was once again the world's sixth-most-popular website according to Alexa Internet, up one place from the position it held in the previous year.

==== 2017 ====
In mid-2017, Wikipedia was listed as the world's fifth-most-popular website according to Alexa Internet, rising one place from the position it held in the previous year. Wikipedia Zero was made available in Iraq and Afghanistan. On 29 April 2017, online access to Wikipedia was blocked across all language editions in Turkey by the Turkish authorities. This block lasted until 15 January 2020, as the court of Turkey ruled that the block violated human rights. The encrypted Japanese Wikipedia has been blocked in China since 28 December 2017.

==== 2018 ====
On 13 April 2018, the number of Chinese Wikipedia articles exceeded 1 million, becoming the fourteenth Wikipedia to reach that milestone. The Chinese Wikipedia has been blocked in Mainland China since May 2015. Later in the year, on 26 June, the Portuguese Wikipedia exceeded the one million article mark, becoming the fifteenth Wikipedia to reach that milestone. The millionth article was Perdão de Richard Nixon (the Pardon of Richard Nixon). During 2018, Wikipedia retained its listing as the world's fifth-most-popular website according to Alexa Internet. One notable development was the use of Artificial Intelligence to create draft articles on overlooked topics.

==== 2019 ====
On 23 April 2019, Chinese authorities expanded the block of Wikipedia to versions in all languages. The timing of the block coincided with the 30th anniversary of the 1989 Tiananmen Square protests and massacre and the 100th anniversary of the May Fourth Movement, resulting in stricter internet censorship in China. In August 2019, according to Alexa.com, Wikipedia fell from fifth-placed to seventh-placed website in the world for global internet engagement.

In the same year, a copy of Wikipedia was sent to the Moon, as part of the Arch Lunar Library. Due to a failure, the rocket crashed into the surface of the Moon, but, thanks to the use of special, very resistant nickel disks, the copy is believed to have survived the crash.

=== Third decade: 2020–present ===
==== 2020 ====
On 23 January 2020, the six millionth article, the biography of Maria Elise Turner Lauder, was added to the English Wikipedia. Despite this growth in articles, Wikipedia's global internet engagement, as measured by Alexa, continued to decline. By February 2020, Wikipedia fell to the eleventh-placed website in the world for global internet engagement. Both Wikipedia's coverage of the COVID-19 pandemic crisis and the supporting edits, discussions, and even deletions were thought to be a useful resource for future historians seeking to understand the period in detail. The World Health Organization collaborated with Wikipedia as a key resource for the dissemination of COVID-19-related information as to help combat the spread of misinformation.

==== 2021 ====
In January 2021, Wikipedia's 20th anniversary was noted in the media. On 13 January 2021, the English Wikipedia reached one billion edits, where the billionth edit was made by Steven Pruitt. MIT Press published an open access book of essays Wikipedia @ 20: Stories of an Unfinished Revolution, edited by Joseph Reagle and Jackie Koerner with contributions from prominent Wikipedians, Wikimedians, researchers, journalists, librarians and other experts reflecting on particular histories and themes. By November 2021, Wikipedia had fallen to the thirteenth-placed website in the world for global internet engagement.

==== 2022 ====
On 6 December 2022, Wikipedian Richard Knipel created the article Artwork title, whose first revision was a draft generated by ChatGPT that Knipel had made minor edits to more closely conform with Wikipedia standards. Knipel stated on a talk page that he believed this was the first time anyone had used ChatGPT to compose a Wikipedia article. The posting of this article was criticized by other editors and sparked controversy within the Wikipedia community, leading to an extensive debate about whether ChatGPT and similar models should be used in writing content for Wikipedia and, if so, to what extent.

==== 2023 ====
In January 2023, the default Wikipedia desktop interface was changed for the first time since 2010, to Vector 2022. The new interface received abundant criticism from users. Many objections focused on the fixed-width layout, which created excessive white space on the margins on wide monitors, leading to a 90,000-word discussion on whether the new skin should become the default. Swahili Wikipedia unanimously voted to reject the new skin and "curtly" demanded a return to the old skin. Other criticism was directed at the Wikimedia Foundation for hiring a design team with limited experience on wikis. Brandon Harris, who was a senior designer at Wikipedia from 2010 to 2014, said: "Wikimedia Foundation often hires designers who aren't familiar with the community, and they come in and try to make all these changes—running head-first into a buzz saw—and the community understandably resists".

Sound logo of Wikimedia (including Wikipedia)

After consultation and a contest, the first sound logo of Wikimedia (including Wikipedia) was adopted.

==== 2024 ====
On January 13, 2024, a copy of the English Wikipedia, stored in 5D optical data storage, was installed in an underground research facility in Switzerland, with the potential for being preserved for up to 14 billion years, thanks to the storage technology used. The copy is readable by using a microscope, without the need of using digital technology.

On 22 February 2024, a copy of the English Wikipedia was successfully landed on the Moon, as part of the Galactic Legacy Archive project. The mission was carried out by Intuitive Machines, while the rocket was launched by SpaceX. The data was stored using 16 layers of nickel, and it's estimated that it can remain on the Moon's surface for up to 5 billion years.

==== 2025 ====
In the second half of 2025, temporary accounts were introduced for logged-out editors on most wikipedias, replacing the use of IP addresses.

==== 2026 ====
Illustration of Baby Globe scrolling on a phone

On 15 January 2026, Wikipedia celebrated its 25th anniversary. A docuseries and a "time capsule" were created as part of the celebrations. A mascot designed by user BaduFerreira called Baby Globe was released. It appeared when birthday mode was enabled on Wikipedia. A Baby Globe collectable plush was developed in collaboration with Makeship. Baby Globe was removed from the Wikipedia site on April 7.

On 27 March 2026, English Wikipedia banned the use of content generated by LLMs in its articles, with the exception of translations and minor copy edits.

On 11 May 2026, Wikipedia released the 25th Anniversary Reading Challenge for the iOS app from May 11 to June 18, and Baby Globe was reintroduced.

== History by subject area ==
=== Hardware and software ===
- In January 2001, Wikipedia ran on UseModWiki, written in Perl by Clifford Adams. The server still runs on Linux, although the original text was stored in files rather than in a database. Articles were named with the CamelCase convention.
- In January 2002, "Phase II" of the wiki software powering Wikipedia was introduced, replacing the older UseModWiki. Written specifically for the project by Magnus Manske, it included a PHP wiki engine.
- In July 2002, a major rewrite of the software powering Wikipedia went live; dubbed "Phase III", it replaced the older "Phase II" version, and became MediaWiki. It was written by Lee Daniel Crocker in response to the increasing demands of the growing project.
- In October 2002, Derek Ramsey created a bot – an automated program called Rambot – to add a large number of articles about United States towns; these articles were automatically generated from U.S. census data. He thus increased the number of Wikipedia articles by 33,832. This has been called "the most controversial move in Wikipedia history".
- In January 2003, support for mathematical formulas in TeX was added. The code was contributed by Tomasz Węgrzanowski.
- On 9 June 2003, Wikipedia's ISBN interface was amended to make ISBNs in articles link to Special:Booksources, which fetches its contents from the user-editable page Wikipedia:Book sources. Before this, ISBN link targets were coded into the software and new ones were suggested on the Wikipedia:ISBN page. See the edit that changed this.
- After 6 December 2003, various system messages shown to Wikipedia users were no longer hard coded, allowing Wikipedia administrators to modify certain parts of MediaWiki's interface, such as the message shown to blocked users.
- On 12 February 2004, server operations were moved from San Diego, California to Tampa, Florida.
- On 29 May 2004, all the various websites were updated to a new version of the MediaWiki software.
- On 30 May 2004, the first instances of "categorization" entries appeared. Category schemes, like Recent Changes and Edit This Page, had existed since the founding of Wikipedia. However, Sanger had viewed the schemes as lists, and even hand-entered articles, whereas the categorization effort centered on individual categorization entries in each article of the encyclopedia, as part of a larger automatic categorization of the articles of the encyclopedia.
- After 3 June 2004, administrators could edit the style of the interface by changing the CSS in the monobook stylesheet at MediaWiki:Monobook.css.
- Also on 30 May 2004, with MediaWiki 1.3, the Template namespace was created, allowing transclusion of standard texts.
- On 7 June 2005 at 3:00 a.m. Eastern Standard Time, the bulk of the Wikimedia servers were moved to a new facility across the street. All Wikimedia projects were down during this time.
- In March 2013, the first phase of the Wikidata interwiki database became available across Wikipedia's language editions.
- In July 2013, the VisualEditor editing interface was inaugurated, allowing users to edit Wikipedia using a WYSIWYG text editor (similar to a word processor) instead of wiki markup. An editing interface optimised for mobile devices was also released.

=== Look and feel ===
- On 4 April 2002, BrilliantProse, since renamed Featured Articles, was moved to the Wikipedia namespace from the article namespace.
- Around 15 October 2003, a new Wikipedia logo was installed. The logo concept was selected by a voting process, which was followed by a revision process to select the best variant. The final selection was created by David Friedland (who edits Wikipedia under the username "nohat") based on a logo design and concept created by Paul Stansifer.
- On 22 February 2004, Did You Know (DYK) made its first Main Page appearance.
- On 23 February 2004, a coordinated new look for the Main Page appeared at 19:46 UTC. Hand-chosen entries for the Daily Featured Article, Anniversaries, In the News, and Did You Know rounded out the new look.
- On 10 January 2005, the multilingual portal at www.wikipedia.org was set up, replacing a redirect to the English-language Wikipedia.
- On 5 February 2005, Portal:Biology was created, becoming the first thematic "portal" on the English Wikipedia. However, the concept was pioneered on the German Wikipedia, where Portal:Recht (law studies) was set up in October 2003.
- On 16 July 2005, the English Wikipedia began the practice of including the day's "featured pictures" on the Main Page.
- On 19 March 2006, following a vote, the Main Page of the English-language Wikipedia featured its first redesign in nearly two years.
- On 13 May 2010, the site released a new interface. New features included an updated logo, new navigation tools, and a link wizard.

==== Layout changes in 2023 ====
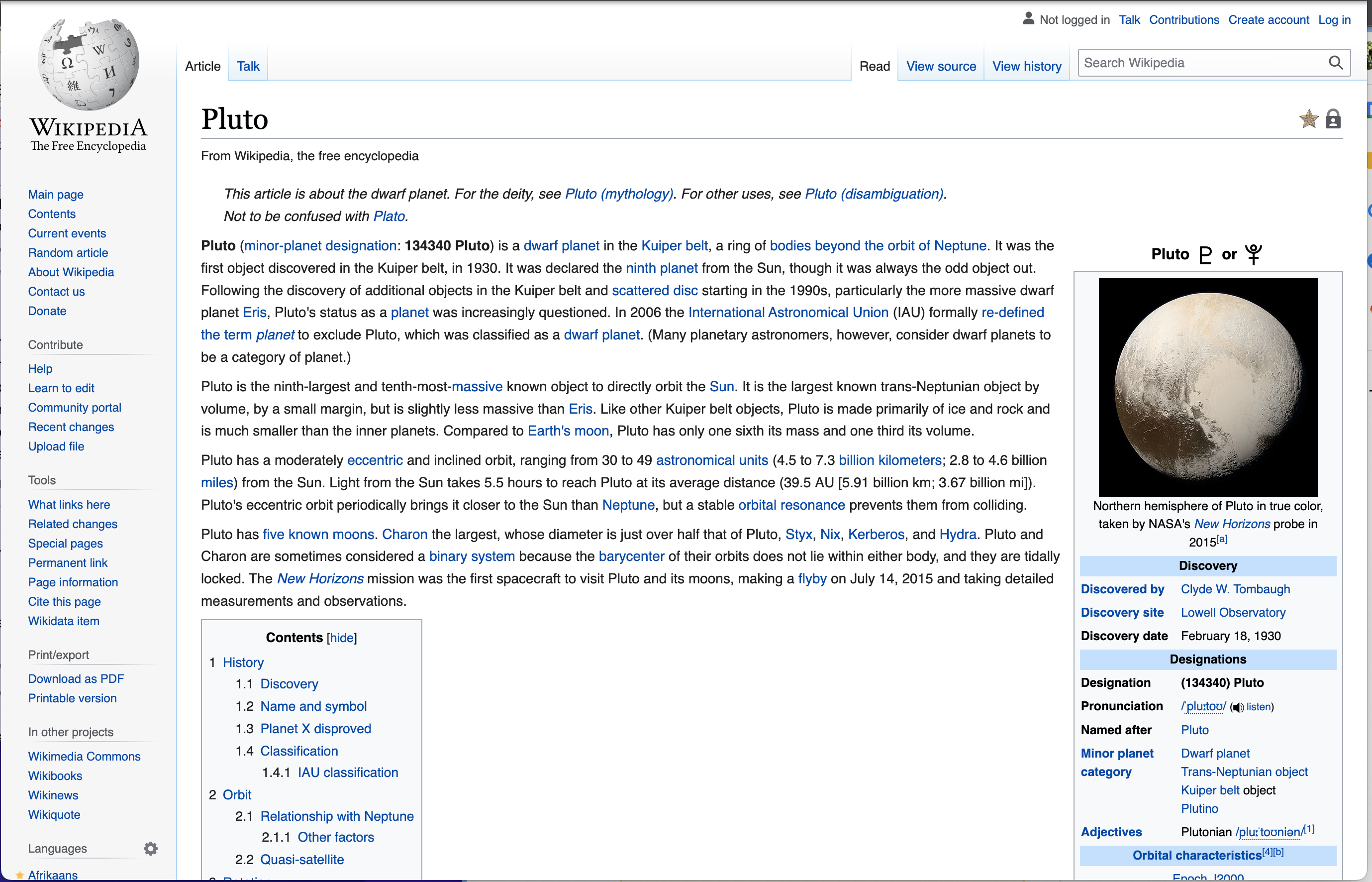
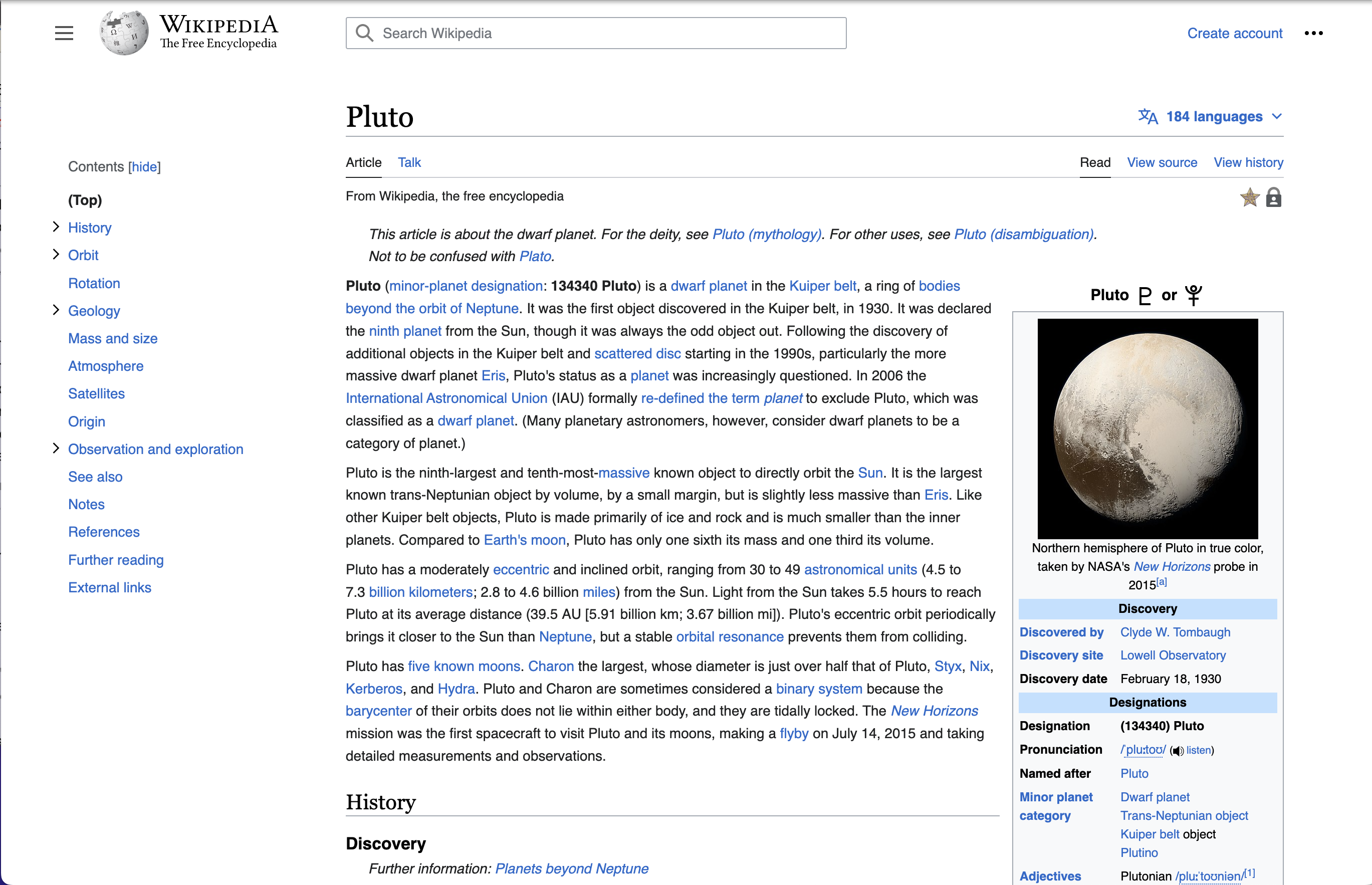
The Pluto article on the English Wikipedia,
displayed with the Vector 2010 (left) and Vector 2022 skins enabled

Vector 2022, an update to Wikipedia's previous skin Vector 2010, was announced in September 2020, and initially slated for debut in 2021, before being ultimately deployed in January 2023. By January 2023, Wikimedia had made the update available to 300 of its language editions; it was the default for the Arabic and Greek versions.

Vector 2022 features a revised user interface which makes numerous changes to the arrangement of the interface elements. Among them, the language selection menu, previously located to the left of the screen, now is found in the top right corner of the display of the article that is currently read. Additionally, the sidebar is collapsible behind a hamburger button. Vector 2022 additionally increases the margins of the article display, which has the effect of limiting the width of the article; a toggle exists which can decrease the margins and expand the line width of the article to fill the screen. The default size of the text has not been increased, although the Wikimedia Foundation told Engadget that they hope to make this an option in future. The search function was also updated in Vector 2022, as the suggested results in response to user queries now include images and short descriptions from the pages in question.

The Wikimedia Foundation said that the change was motivated by a desire to modernize the site and improve the navigation and editing experience for readers inexperienced with the internet, as the previous skin was deemed "clunky and overwhelming." Tests conducted by the foundation yielded results of a 30 percent increase in user searches, and a 15 percent decrease in scrolling. Early versions of Vector 2022 first went live in 2020 on the French-, Hebrew-, and Portuguese-language Wikipedia sites, as the skin's new features were rolled out to users for testing gradually before its full release. The skin went live as the default skin for readers of Wikimedia sites in 300 (out of 318) languages on 18 January 2023.

Following the mass rollout of Vector 2022, it is still possible to read Wikipedia using the previous skin. However, to do so requires readers to register for a Wikipedia account, and then set their preferences to display Vector 2010 instead. No changes were made to existing Wikipedia skins such as Monobook and Timeless, which also remain available to use.

Wikipedia users were divided on the changes. A request for comment on the English Wikipedia asking the community whether or not Vector 2022 should be deployed as the default skin accumulated over 90,000 words in responses. Critics of the redesign objected most prominently to the white space left empty in the new skin, while other users criticized said critics as having a kneejerk resistance to change. 165 editors participating in the discussion disapproved of the new skin, while 153 were in favor, and nine remained neutral. Despite the larger number of editors who expressed that they did not want Vector 2022 to be deployed in its then-current form, as consensus on Wikipedia is not decided by vote, the discussion was closed in favor of the redesign, considering the positive comments left by other users. The Vector 2022 developers made some changes to the skin in response to the criticisms, such as adding a toggle to enable article content to fill the entire width of the screen. Users on the Swahili Wikipedia unanimously disagreed with the enactment of the new skin.

Journalists responding to Vector 2022's rollout considered the update and the new features introduced as useful additions, but generally characterized the skin as a minor update that did not fundamentally change their reading experience on Wikipedia. Annie Rauwerda, creator of the Depths of Wikipedia social media accounts, wrote in Slate that Vector 2022 was not "dramatically different" from the previous skin. Rauwerda additionally noted the similarity between the Wikipedia community backlash against the design and previous resistances to similar visual changes on popular sites such as Reddit. Rauwerda, and Mike Pearl of Mashable, commented that users displeased with the change could weigh in on a discussion about the skin, or use the site's built-in customization features to alter their reading experience.

=== Internal structures ===
- In April 2001, Wales formally defines the "neutral point of view", Wikipedia's core non-negotiable editorial policy, a reformulation of the "Lack of Bias" policy outlined by Sanger for Nupedia in spring or summer 2000, which covered many of the same core principles.
- In September 2001, collaboration by subject matter in WikiProjects is introduced.
- In February 2002, concerns over the risk of future censorship and commercialization by Bomis Inc (Wikipedia's original host) combined with a lack of guarantee this would not happen, led most participants of the Spanish Wikipedia to break away and establish it independently as the Enciclopedia Libre. Following clarification of Wikipedia's status and non-commercial nature later that year, re-merger talks between Enciclopedia Libre and the re-founded Spanish Wikipedia occasionally took place in 2002 and 2003, but no conclusion was reached. By 2011, Enciclopedia Libre was considered to be in decline; it ceased operations in late 2024.
- Also in 2002, policy and style issues were clarified with the creation of the Manual of Style, along with a number of other policies and guidelines.
- In November 2002, new mailing lists for WikiEN and Announce were set up, as well as other language mailing lists, to reduce the volume of traffic on mailing lists.
- In July 2003, the rule against editing one's autobiography is introduced.
- On 28 October 2003, the first "real" meeting of Wikipedians happened in Munich. Many cities followed suit, and soon a number of regular Wikipedian get-togethers were established around the world. Several Internet communities, including one on the popular blog website LiveJournal, have also sprung up since.
- From 10 July to 30 August 2004 the Wikipedia:Browse and Wikipedia:Browse by overview formerly on the Main Page were replaced by links to overviews. On 27 August 2004 the Community Portal was started, to serve as a focus for community efforts. These were previously accomplished on an informal basis, by individual queries of the Recent Changes, in wiki style, as ad hoc collaborations between like-minded editors.
- During September to December 2005 following the Seigenthaler controversy and other similar concerns, several anti-abuse features and policies were added to Wikipedia. These were:
  - The policy for "Checkuser" (a MediaWiki extension to assist detection of abuse via internet sock-puppetry) was established in November 2005. Checkuser function had previously existed but was viewed more as a system tool at the time, so there had been no need for a policy covering use on a more routine basis.
  - Creation of new pages on the English Wikipedia was restricted to editors who had created a user account.
  - The introduction and rapid adoption of the policy Wikipedia:Biographies of living people, giving a far tighter quality control and fact-check system to biographical articles related to living people.
  - The "semi-protection" function and policy, allowing pages to be protected so that only those with an account could edit.
- In May 2006, a new "oversight" feature was introduced on the English Wikipedia, allowing a handful of highly trusted users to permanently erase page revisions containing copyright infringements or libelous or personal information from a page's history. Previous to this, page version deletion was laborious, and also deleted versions remained visible to other administrators and could be un-deleted by them.
- On 1 January 2007, the subcommunity named Esperanza was disbanded by communal consent. Esperanza had begun as an effort to promote "wikilove" and a social support network, but had developed its own subculture and private structures. Its disbanding was described as the painful but necessary remedy for a project that had allowed editors to "see themselves as Esperanzans first and foremost". A number of Esperanza's subprojects were integrated back into Wikipedia as free-standing projects, but most of them are now inactive. When the group was founded in September 2005, there had been concerns expressed that it would eventually be condemned as such.
- In April 2007, the results of a 4-month policy review by a working group of several hundred editors seeking to merge the core Wikipedia policies into one core policy (Wikipedia:Attribution) were polled for community support. The proposal did not gain consensus; a significant view became evident that the existing structure of three strong focused policies covering the respective areas of policy, was frequently seen as more helpful to quality control than one more general merged proposal.
- A one-day blackout of Wikipedia was called by Jimmy Wales on 18 January 2012, in conjunction with Google and over 7,000 other websites, to protest the Stop Online Piracy Act then under consideration by the United States Congress.

=== The Wikimedia Foundation and legal structures ===
- In August 2002, shortly after Jimmy Wales announced that he would never run commercial advertisements on Wikipedia, the URL of Wikipedia was changed from wikipedia.com to wikipedia.org (.com and .org).
- On 20 June 2003, the Wikimedia Foundation was founded.
- Communications committee was formed in January 2006 to handle media inquiries and emails received for the foundation and Wikipedia via the newly implemented OTRS (a ticket handling system).
- Angela Beesley and Florence Nibart-Devouard were elected to the Board of Trustees of the Wikimedia Foundation. During this time, Angela was active in editing content and setting policies, such as privacy policy, within the Foundation.
- On 10 January 2006, Wikipedia became a registered trademark of Wikimedia Foundation.
- In July 2006, Angela Beesley resigned from the board of the Wikimedia Foundation.
- In October 2006, Florence Nibart-Devouard became chair of the board of the Wikimedia Foundation.

=== Edit milestones and projects ===
- On 15 January 2001, the first recorded edit of Wikipedia was performed.
- In December 2002, the first sister project, Wiktionary, was created; aiming to produce a dictionary and thesaurus of the words in all languages. It uses the same software as Wikipedia.
- On 22 January 2003, the English Wikipedia was again slashdotted after having reached the 100,000 article milestone with the Hastings, article. Two days later, the German-language Wikipedia, the largest non-English language version, passed the 10,000 article mark.
- On 20 June 2003, the same day that the Wikimedia Foundation was founded, "Wikiquote" was created. A month later, "Wikibooks" was launched. "Wikisource" was set up towards the end of the year.
- In January 2004, Wikipedia reached the 200,000-article milestone in English with the article on Neil Warnock, and reached 450,000 articles for both English and non-English Wikipedias. The next month, the combined article count of the English and non-English reached 500,000.
- On 20 April 2004, the article count of the English Wikipedia reached 250,000.
- On 7 July 2004, the article count of the English Wikipedia reached 300,000.
- On 20 September 2004, Wikipedia's total article count exceeded 1,000,000 articles in over 105 languages; the project received a flurry of related attention in the press. The one millionth article was published in the Hebrew Wikipedia and discusses the flag of Kazakhstan.
- On 20 November 2004, the article count of the English Wikipedia reached 400,000.
- On 18 March 2005, Wikipedia passed the 500,000-article milestone in English, with Involuntary settlements in the Soviet Union being announced in a press release as the landmark article.
- In May 2005, Wikipedia became the most popular reference website on the Internet according to traffic monitoring company Hitwise, relegating Dictionary.com to second place.
- On 29 September 2005, the English Wikipedia passed the 750,000-article mark.
- On 1 March 2006, the English Wikipedia passed the 1,000,000-article mark, with Jordanhill railway station being announced on the Main Page as the milestone article.
- On 8 June 2006, the English Wikipedia passed the 1,000-featured-article mark, with Iranian peoples.
- On 15 August 2006, the Wikimedia Foundation launched Wikiversity.
- On 1 September 2006, Wikipedia exceeded 5,000,000 articles across all 229 language editions.
- On 24 November 2006, the English Wikipedia passed the 1,500,000-article mark, with Kanab ambersnail being announced on the Main Page as the milestone article.
- On 4 April 2007, the first Wikipedia CD selection in English was published as a free download.
- On 22 April 2007, the English Wikipedia passed the 1,750,000-article mark. RAF raid on La Caine HQ was the 1,750,000th article.
- On 9 September 2007, the English Wikipedia passed the 2,000,000-article mark. El Hormiguero was accepted by consensus as the 2,000,000th article.
- On 28 March 2008, Wikipedia exceeded 10 million articles across all 251 language editions.
- On 11 October 2008, the English Wikipedia passed the 2,500,000-article mark. While no attempt was made to officially identify the 2,500,000th article, Joe Connor (baseball) has been suggested as the possible article.
- On 17 August 2009, the English Wikipedia passed the 3,000,000-article mark, with Beate Eriksen being announced on the Main Page as the milestone article.
- On 27 December 2009, the German Wikipedia exceeded 1,000,000 articles, becoming the second Wikipedia language edition to do so.
- On 21 September 2010, the French Wikipedia exceeded 1,000,000 articles, becoming the third Wikipedia language edition to do so.
- On 12 December 2010, the English Wikipedia passed the 3,500,000-article mark.
- On 22 November 2011, Wikipedia exceeded 20 million articles across all 282 language editions.
- On 7 November 2011, the German Wikipedia exceeded 100 million page edits.
- On 24 November 2011, the English Wikipedia exceeded 500 million page edits.
- On 17 December 2011, the Dutch Wikipedia exceeded 1,000,000 articles, becoming the fourth Wikipedia language edition to do so.
- On 13 July 2012, the English Wikipedia exceeded 4,000,000 articles, with Izbat al-Burj.
- On 22 January 2013, the Italian Wikipedia exceeded 1,000,000 articles, becoming the fifth Wikipedia language edition to do so.
- On 11 May 2013, the Russian Wikipedia exceeded 1,000,000 articles, becoming the sixth Wikipedia language edition to do so.
- On 16 May 2013, the Spanish Wikipedia exceeded 1,000,000 articles, becoming the seventh Wikipedia language edition to do so.
- On 15 June 2013, the Swedish Wikipedia exceeded 1,000,000 articles, becoming the eighth Wikipedia language edition to do so.
- On 25 September 2013, the Polish Wikipedia exceeded 1,000,000 articles, becoming the ninth Wikipedia language edition to do so.
- On 21 October 2013, Wikipedia exceeded 30 million articles across all 287 language editions.
- On 17 December 2013, the French Wikipedia exceeded 100,000,000 page edits.
- On 25 April 2014, the English Wikipedia passed the 4,500,000 article mark.
- On 8 June 2014, the Waray Wikipedia exceeded 1,000,000 articles, becoming the tenth Wikipedia language edition to do so.
- On 15 June 2014, the Vietnamese Wikipedia exceeded 1,000,000 articles, becoming the eleventh Wikipedia language edition to do so.
- On 17 July 2014, the Cebuano Wikipedia exceeded 1,000,000 articles, becoming the twelfth Wikipedia language edition to do so.
- On 6 September 2015, the Swedish Wikipedia exceeded 2,000,000 articles, becoming the second Wikipedia language edition to do so.
- On 1 November 2015, the English Wikipedia exceeded 5,000,000 articles, with Persoonia terminalis, and it has over 125,000 editors who have made 1 or more edits in the past 30 days.
- On 1 February 2016, the Japanese Wikipedia exceeded 1,000,000 articles, becoming the thirteenth Wikipedia language edition to do so.
- On 14 February 2016, the Cebuano Wikipedia exceeded 2,000,000 articles, becoming the third Wikipedia language edition to do so.
- On 29 April 2016, the Swedish Wikipedia exceeded 3,000,000 articles, becoming the third Wikipedia language edition to do so.
- On 26 May 2016, Wikipedia exceeded 40 million articles across all 293 language editions.
- On 26 September 2016, the Cebuano Wikipedia exceeded 3,000,000 articles, becoming the fourth Wikipedia language edition to do so.
- On 19 November 2016, the German Wikipedia exceeded 2,000,000 articles, becoming the fifth Wikipedia language edition to do so.
- On 3 March 2017, the Cebuano Wikipedia exceeded 4,000,000 articles, becoming the second Wikipedia language edition to do so.
- On 6 July 2017, the Spanish Wikipedia exceeded 100,000,000 page edits.
- On 15 September 2017, the Russian Wikipedia exceeded 100,000,000 page edits.
- On 27 October 2017, the English Wikipedia passed the 5,500,000-article mark.
- On 13 April 2018, the Chinese Wikipedia exceeded 1,000,000 articles, becoming the fourteenth Wikipedia language edition to do so.
- On 27 June 2018, the Portuguese Wikipedia exceeded 1,000,000 articles, becoming the fifteenth Wikipedia language edition to do so.
- On 8 July 2018, the French Wikipedia exceeded 2,000,000 articles, becoming the fifth Wikipedia language edition to do so.
- On 14 October 2018, the Arabic Wikipedia exceeded 1,000,000 articles, becoming the sixteenth Wikipedia language edition to do so.
- On 20 January 2019, the Spanish Wikipedia exceeded 1,500,000 articles, becoming the seventh Wikipedia language edition to do so.
- On 1 February 2019, the Wikipedia News recalculated that the Italian Wikipedia exceeded 1,500,000 articles, becoming the eighth Wikipedia language edition to do so.
- On 9 March 2019, Wikipedia exceeded 50 million articles across all 309 language editions.
- On 2 August 2019, the South Azerbaijani Wikipedia exceeded 1,000,000 page edits.
- On 17 November 2019, the Arabic Wikipedia exceeded 1,000,000 articles, becoming the eighteenth Wikipedia language edition to do so.
- On 23 January 2020, the English Wikipedia exceeded 6,000,000 articles, with Maria Elise Turner Lauder as the milestone article.
- On 9 March 2020, the Dutch Wikipedia exceeded 2,000,000 articles, becoming the sixth Wikipedia language edition to do so.
- On 23 March 2020, the Ukrainian Wikipedia exceeded 1,000,000 articles, becoming the seventeenth Wikipedia language edition to do so.
- On 1 July 2020, the Egyptian Arabic Wikipedia exceeded 1,000,000 articles, becoming the eighteenth Wikipedia language edition to do so.
- On 25 December 2020, the Bengali Wikipedia exceeded 100,000 articles.
- On 3 February 2021, the Malagasy Wikipedia exceeded 1,000,000 page edits.
- On 4 February 2021, the English Wikipedia exceeded 1 billion page edits.
- On 14 October 2021, the Cebuano Wikipedia exceeded 6,000,000 articles, becoming the second Wikipedia language edition to do so.
- On 14 December 2021, the Polish Wikipedia exceeded 1,500,000 articles, becoming the twelfth Wikipedia language edition to do so.
- On 26 December 2021, the Egyptian Arabic Wikipedia exceeded 1,500,000 articles.
- On 19 January 2022, the Indonesian Wikipedia exceeded 20 million page edits.
- On 17 October 2022, The Norwegian Wikipedia exceeded 600,000 articles.
- On 27 November 2022, Wikipedia exceeded 60 million articles across all 329 language editions.

=== Fundraising ===
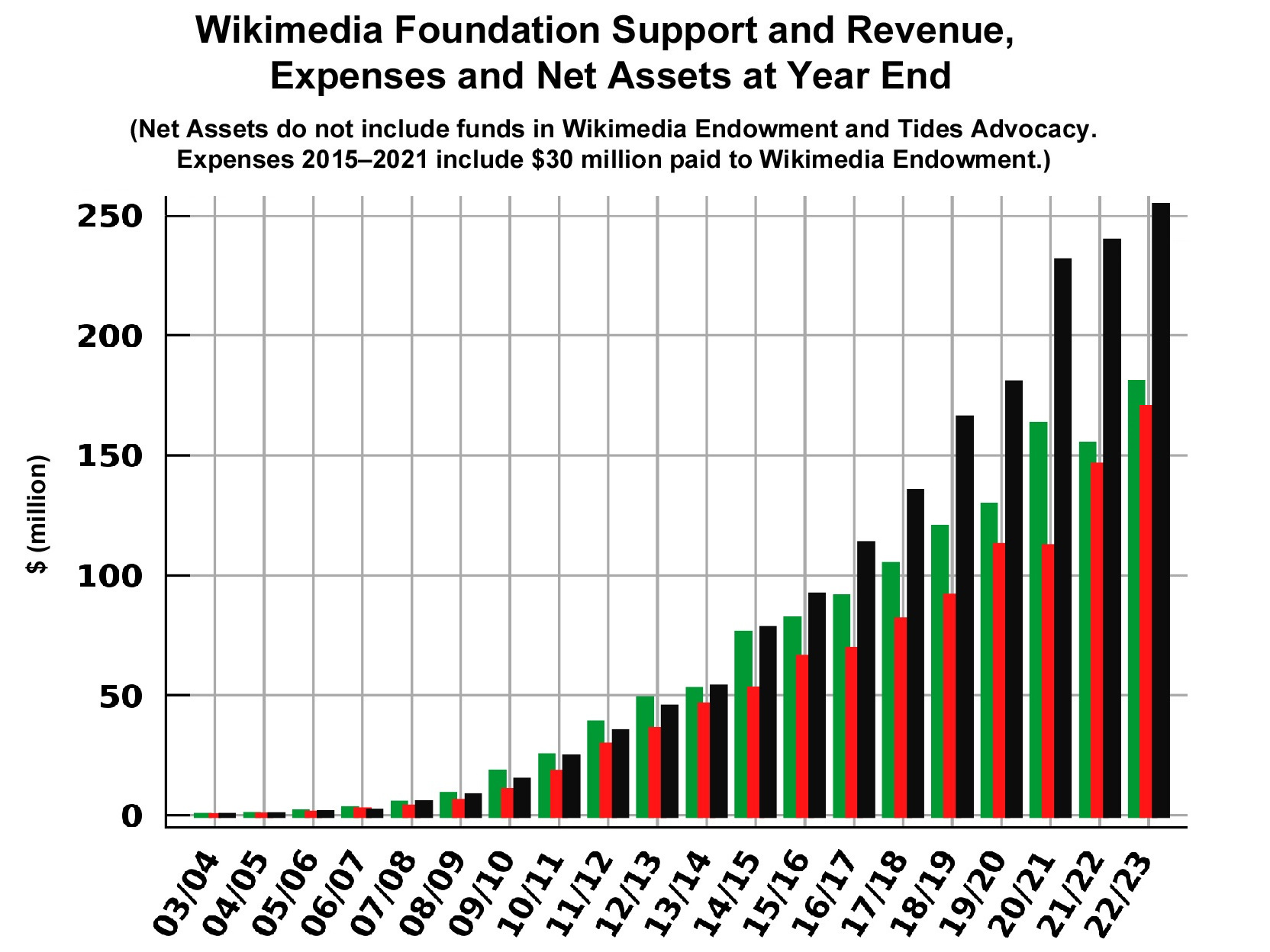
Financial development of the Wikimedia Foundation (in US$), 2003–2023 Black: Net assets (excluding the Wikimedia Endowment, which currently stands at $100m+) Green: Revenue (excluding third-party donations to Wikimedia Endowment) Red: Expenses (including WMF payments to Wikimedia Endowment)

Every year, the Wikimedia Foundation runs fundraising campaigns on Wikipedia to support its operations. These generally last about a month and happen at different times of the year in different countries. In addition to the fundraising banners on Wikipedia itself, there are also email campaigns; some emails invite people to leave the Wikimedia Foundation money in their wills. Revenue has risen every year of the Wikimedia Foundation's existence, reaching US$180.17 million as of 30 June 2023, versus expenses of US$169.1 million. In addition, the Wikimedia Endowment, an organizationally separate fundraising effort begun in 2016, reached $100 million in 2021, five years sooner than planned.

| Year | Source | Revenue | Expenses | Asset rise | Total assets |
|---|---|---|---|---|---|
| 2024/2025 | PDF | $208,567,153 | $190,938,007 | $24,994,640 | $296,550,030 |
| 2023/2024 | PDF | $185,383,511 | $178,471,109 | $16,584,053 | $271,555,390 |
| 2022/2023 | PDF | $180,174,103 | $169,095,381 | $15,619,804 | $254,971,336 |
| 2021/2022 | PDF | $154,686,521 | $145,970,915 | $8,173,996 | $239,351,532 |
| 2020/2021 | PDF | $162,886,686 | $111,839,819 | $50,861,811 | $231,177,536 |
| 2019/2020 | PDF | $129,234,327 | $112,489,397 | $14,674,300 | $180,315,725 |
| 2018/2019 | PDF | $120,067,266 | $91,414,010 | $30,691,855 | $165,641,425 |
| 2017/2018 | PDF | $104,505,783 | $81,442,265 | $21,619,373 | $134,949,570 |
| 2016/2017 | PDF | $91,242,418 | $69,136,758 | $21,547,402 | $113,330,197 |
| 2015/2016 | PDF | $81,862,724 | $65,947,465 | $13,962,497 | $91,782,795 |
| 2014/2015 | PDF | $75,797,223 | $52,596,782 | $24,345,277 | $77,820,298 |
| 2013/2014 | PDF | $52,465,287 | $45,900,745 | $8,285,897 | $53,475,021 |
| 2012/2013 | PDF | $48,635,408 | $35,704,796 | $10,260,066 | $45,189,124 |
| 2011/2012 | PDF | $38,479,665 | $29,260,652 | $10,736,914 | $34,929,058 |
| 2010/2011 | PDF | $24,785,092 | $17,889,794 | $9,649,413 | $24,192,144 |
| 2009/2010 | PDF | $17,979,312 | $10,266,793 | $6,310,964 | $14,542,731 |
| 2008/2009 | PDF | $8,658,006 | $5,617,236 | $3,053,599 | $8,231,767 |
| 2007/2008 | PDF | $5,032,981 | $3,540,724 | $3,519,886 | $5,178,168 |
| 2006/2007 | PDF | $2,734,909 | $2,077,843 | $654,066 | $1,658,282 |
| 2005/2006 | PDF | $1,508,039 | $791,907 | $736,132 | $1,004,216 |
| 2004/2005 | PDF | $379,088 | $177,670 | $211,418 | $268,084 |
| 2003/2004 | PDF | $ 80,129 | $23,463 | $56,666 | $56,666 |

=== External impact ===
- In 2007, Wikipedia was deemed fit to be used as a major source by the UK Intellectual Property Office in a Formula One trademark case ruling.
- Over time, Wikipedia gained recognition amongst more traditional media as a "key source" for major new events, such as the 2004 Indian Ocean earthquake and related tsunami, the 2008 American Presidential election, and 2007 Virginia Tech shooting. The latter article was accessed 750,000 times in two days, with newspapers published locally to the shootings adding that "Wikipedia has emerged as the clearinghouse for detailed information on the event."
- On 21 February 2007, Noam Cohen of the New York Times reported that some academics were banning the use of Wikipedia as a research tool.
- On 27 February 2007, an article in The Harvard Crimson newspaper reported that some professors at Harvard University included Wikipedia in their syllabi, but that there was a split in their perception of using Wikipedia.
- In July 2013, a large-scale study by four major universities identified the most disputed articles on Wikipedia, finding that Israel, Adolf Hitler, and God were more fiercely debated than any other subjects.

==== Effect of biographical articles ====
Because Wikipedia biographies are often updated with new information comes, they are often used as a reference source on the lives of notable people. This has led to attempts to manipulate and falsify Wikipedia articles for promotional or defamatory purposes (Controversies) and has also led to novel uses of the biographical material provided.

- In November 2005, the Seigenthaler controversy occurred when a hoaxer asserted on Wikipedia that journalist John Seigenthaler had been involved in the Kennedy assassination of 1963.
- In December 2006, German comedian Atze Schröder sued Arne Klempert, secretary of Wikimedia Deutschland because he did not want his real name published in Wikipedia. Schröder later withdrew his complaint but wanted his attorney's costs to be paid by Klempert. A court decided that the artist had to cover those costs himself.
- On 16 February 2007, Turkish historian Taner Akçam was briefly detained upon arrival at Montréal–Pierre Elliott Trudeau International Airport because of false information on his Wikipedia biography claiming he was a terrorist.
- In November 2008, the German Left Party politician Lutz Heilmann claimed that some remarks in his Wikipedia article caused damage to his reputation. He succeeded in getting a court order to make Wikimedia Deutschland remove a key search portal. The result was a national outpouring of support for Wikipedia, more donations to Wikimedia Deutschland, and a rise in daily pageviews of the Lutz Heilmann article from a few dozen to half a million. Shortly after, Heilmann asked the court to withdraw the court order.
- In December 2008, Wikimedia Nederland, the Dutch chapter, won a preliminary injunction after an entrepreneur was linked in "his" article with the criminal Willem Holleeder and wanted the article deleted. The judge in Utrecht believed Wikimedia's assertion that it has no influence on the content of Dutch Wikipedia.
- In February 2009, when the German politician Karl Theodor Maria Nikolaus Johann Jacob Philipp Franz Joseph Sylvester Buhl-Freiherr von und zu Guttenberg became a federal minister on 10 February 2009, an unregistered user added an eleventh given name in the article on German Wikipedia: Wilhelm. Numerous newspapers adopted it. When wary Wikipedians tried to remove Wilhelm, the edit was reverted citing those newspapers. This case about Wikipedia reliability and journalists copying from Wikipedia was dubbed Falscher Wilhelm ("wrong Wilhelm").

=== Early roles of Wales and Sanger ===
Wikipedia founders Jimmy Wales and Larry Sanger, both in 2026

Wales, along with others, came up with and funded the idea of an open-source, collaborative encyclopedia that would accept contributions from ordinary people. Sanger played an important role in this as Nupedia's editor-in-chief and main employee. In Sanger's introductory message to the Nupedia mailing list, he said that Jimmy Wales "contacted me and asked me to apply as editor-in-chief of Nupedia. [...] He had had the idea for Nupedia since at least last fall. He tells me that, when thinking about people (particularly philosophers) he knew who could manage this sort of long-term project, he thought I would be perfect for the job. This is indeed my dream job".

Sanger suggested using a wiki to provide a complementary project for people "intimidated and bored" by Nupedia's elaborate processes, and coined the portmanteau "Wikipedia" as the project name. This was broadly seen as a way to unblock the growing community of Nupedians who found it hard to contribute. Sanger continued to work on Nupedia while contributing to Wikipedia (including drafting policies such as "Ignore all rules" and "Neutral point of view") and worked with an outreach lead to build up the community of both Nupedia and Wikipedia editors. Upon departure in March 2002, Sanger emphasized the main issue was purely the cessation of funding for his role, which was not viable part-time, and encouraged others to continue contributing to Wikipedia while noting that Nupedia could not survive without a full-time editor-in-chief. Later that year he stopped contributing to either project, and by 2004 had become publicly critical of Wikipedia. In December 2004 he wrote an essay arguing that Wikipedia was suffering from anti-elitism. In April 2005 he published a two-part memoir of his work on Nupedia and Wikipedia, highlighting his role in their creation and continuing belief that Nupedia deserved to be saved. Later that year Wales began to push back on Sanger's characterization of his role in the project. By 2006, after the launch of Citizendium, Sanger was harshly critical of Wikipedia, describing it as "broken beyond repair."

In 2005, Wales described himself simply as the founder of Wikipedia; however, according to Brian Bergstein of the Associated Press, "Sanger has long been cited as a co-founder." Sanger and Wales were referred to as co-founders in various press releases, interviews, and news reports from 2001 and 2002. Before January 2004, Wales did not dispute Sanger's status as co-founder. In 2006, Wales said, "He used to work for me [...] I don't agree with calling him a co-founder, but he likes the title". Starting in 2006, when Sanger wrote and was interviewed extensively about the launch of Citizendium, he emphasized his status as co-founder, and these earlier sources that described him as such.

=== Controversies ===
- In November 2005, the Seigenthaler controversy caused Brian Chase to resign from his employment, after his identity was ascertained by Daniel Brandt of Wikipedia Watch. Following this, the scientific journal Nature undertook a peer reviewed study to test articles in Wikipedia against their equivalents in Encyclopædia Britannica, and concluded they are comparable in terms of accuracy. Britannica rejected their methodology and their conclusion. Nature refused to release any form of apology, and instead asserted the reliability of its study and a rejection of the criticisms.
- During early-to-mid-2006, the congressional aides biography scandals were publicized, whereby political aides were caught trying to influence the Wikipedia biographies of several politicians. The aides removed undesirable information (including pejorative quotes and broken campaign promises), added favorable information or "glowing" tributes, or replaced the article in part or whole by staff-authored biographies. The staff of at least five politicians were implicated: Marty Meehan, Norm Coleman, Conrad Burns, Joe Biden, and Gil Gutknecht. The activities documented were:

| Politician | Editing undertaken | Sources |
|---|---|---|
| Joe Biden, Delaware senator | Removal of unfavorable information | |
| Conrad Burns, Montana senator | Removal of pejorative statements made by the Senator, replaced with "glowing tributes" as "the voice of the farmer" | |
| Norm Coleman, Minnesota senator | Rewrite to make more favorable, including changing "liberal" to "activist" | |
| Gil Gutknecht, Minnesota congressman | Staff rewrite with removal of broken campaign promise; multiple attempts, first using a named account, then an anonymous IP account | A spokesman for Gutknecht did not dispute that his office edited the entry but questioned Wikipedia's reliability. |
| Marty Meehan, Massachusetts congressman | Replacement with a staff-written biography, including removal of a broken campaign promise | |

In a separate but similar incident, the campaign manager for Cathy Cox for governor of Georgia, Morton Brilliant, resigned after being found to have added negative information to the Wikipedia entries of political opponents. Following media publicity, the incidents tapered off around August 2006.

- In July 2006, Joshua Gardner was exposed as a fake Duke of Cleveland with a Wikipedia page.
- In January 2007, English-language Wikipedians in Qatar were briefly blocked from editing, following a spate of vandalism, by an administrator who did not realize that the country's internet traffic is routed through a single IP address. Multiple media sources promptly declared that Wikipedia was banning Qatar from the site.
- On 23 January 2007, a Microsoft employee offered to pay Rick Jelliffe to review and change certain Wikipedia articles regarding an open-source document standard which was rival to a Microsoft format.
- In February 2007, The New Yorker magazine issued a rare editorial correction that a prominent English Wikipedia editor and administrator known as "Essjay", had invented a persona using fictitious credentials. The editor, Ryan Jordan, became a Wikia employee in January 2007 and divulged his real name; this was noticed by Daniel Brandt of Wikipedia Watch, and communicated to the original article author (Essjay controversy).
- Also in February 2007, Barbara Bauer, a literary agent, sued Wikimedia for defamation and causing harm to her business, the Barbara Bauer Literary Agency. In Bauer v. Glatzer, Bauer claimed that information on Wikipedia critical of her abilities as a literary agent caused this harm. The Electronic Frontier Foundation defended Wikipedia and moved to dismiss the case on 1 May 2008. The case against the Wikimedia Foundation was dismissed on 1 July 2008.
- In June 2007, an anonymous user posted hoax information that, by coincidence, foreshadowed the Chris Benoit murder-suicide, hours before the bodies were found by investigators. The discovery of the edit attracted widespread media attention and was first covered in the sister site Wikinews.
- In October 2007, in their obituaries of recently deceased TV theme composer Ronnie Hazlehurst, many British media organisations reported that he had co-written the S Club 7 song "Reach". In fact, he had not, and it was discovered that this information had been sourced from a hoax edit to Hazlehurst's Wikipedia article.
- On 14 July 2009, the National Portrait Gallery issued a cease-and-desist letter for alleged breach of copyright, against a Wikipedia editor who downloaded more than 3,000 high-resolution images from the NPG website, and placed them on Wikimedia Commons (National Portrait Gallery and Wikimedia Foundation copyright dispute).
- In April and May 2010, there was controversy over the hosting and display of sexual drawing and pornographic images including images of children on Wikipedia. It led to the mass removal of pornographic content from Wikimedia Foundation sites.
- In November 2012, Lord Justice Leveson wrote in his report on British press standards, "The Independent was founded in 1986 by the journalists Andreas Whittam Smith, Stephen Glover and Brett Straub..." He had used the Wikipedia article for The Independent newspaper as his source, but an act of vandalism had replaced Matthew Symonds (a genuine co-founder) with Brett Straub (an unknown character). The Economist said of the Leveson report, "Parts of it are a scissors-and-paste job culled from Wikipedia."
- In late 2013, commentators publicly shared observations of the reappearance of many of the pornographic images deleted from Wikipedia since 2010.

=== Notable forks and derivatives ===
There are a large number of Wikipedia mirror and forks. Other sites also use the MediaWiki software and concept, popularized by Wikipedia. No list of them is maintained. Specialized foreign language forks using the Wikipedia concept include Enciclopedia Libre (Spanish), Wikiweise (German), WikiZnanie (Russian), Susning.nu (Swedish), and Baidu Baike (Chinese). Some of these (such as Enciclopedia Libre) use GFDL or compatible licenses as used by Wikipedia, leading to the exchange of material with their respective language Wikipedias. In 2006, Sanger founded Citizendium, based upon a modified version of MediaWiki. The site said it aimed 'to improve on the Wikipedia model with "gentle expert oversight", among other things'. In 2006, conservative activist and lawyer Andrew Schlafly founded Conservapedia, based on MediaWiki.

=== Publication on other media ===
The German Wikipedia was the first to be partly published also using other media (rather than online on the internet), including releases on CD in November 2004 and more extended versions on CDs or DVD in April 2005 and December 2006. In December 2005, the publisher Zenodot Verlagsgesellschaft mbH, a sister company of Directmedia, published a 139-page book explaining Wikipedia, its history and policies, which was accompanied by a 7.5 GB DVD containing 300,000 articles and 100,000 images from the German Wikipedia. Originally, Directmedia also announced plans to print the German Wikipedia in its entirety, in 100 volumes of 800 pages each. The publication was due to begin in October 2006, and finish in 2010. In March 2006, however, this project was called off.

In September 2008, Bertelsmann published a 1000 pages volume with a selection of popular German Wikipedia articles. Bertelsmann paid voluntarily 1 Euro per sold copy to Wikimedia Deutschland. A free software project has also been launched to make a static version of English Wikipedia available for use on iPods. The "Encyclopodia" project was started around March 2006 and can currently be used on 1st to 4th-generation iPods.

==== English Wikipedia CD/DVD/Kiwix ZIM file releases ====
| Release | Year | Description | Link to ZIM file download |
|---|---|---|---|
| 2006 Wikipedia CD Selection | 2006 | First CD version, containing a selection of articles from the English Wikipedia. It was published in April 2006 by SOS Children. | |
| Wikipedia Version 0.5 | 2007 | A CD containing around 2000 articles selected from the online encyclopedia was published by the Wikimedia Foundation and Linterweb. The selection of articles included was based on both the quality of the online version and the importance of the topic to be included. It was created as a test case in preparation for a DVD version including far more articles. Articles are categorized according to subject. The CD version could be purchased online, downloaded as a DVD image file or Torrent file, or accessed online at the project's website. | |
| Wikipedia Version 0.7 | 2009–2010 | First DVD version. General release of around 31,000 articles taken from all subject areas. A manual effort was performed to remove vandalism, which delayed the release date. Includes topical and geographical indexes of articles, in addition to the alphabetical index. | |
| Wikipedia Version 0.8 | 2011 | General release of around 47,300 articles taken from all subject areas. Article selection and vandalism removal using systems developed by a group of volunteers from the Wikipedia community, greatly improved release time. It includes only an alphabetical index and no article categorization. | |

As of June 2022, there have been no more article selection releases since Wikipedia Version 0.8.

=== Lawsuits ===
In limited ways, the Wikimedia Foundation is protected by Section 230 of the Communications Decency Act. In the defamation action Bauer et al. v. Glatzer et al., it was held that Wikimedia had no case to answer because of this section. A similar law in France caused a lawsuit to be dismissed in October 2007. In 2013, a German appeals court or Oberlandesgericht (the Higher Regional Court of Stuttgart) ruled that Wikipedia is a "service provider" not a "content provider", and as such is immune from liability as long as it takes down content that is accused of being illegal.

== See also ==
- History of wikis
- List of Wikipedias, sorted by launch date
- Predictions of the end of Wikipedia
- The Wikipedia Revolution – 2009 book by Andrew Lih
- The Last Best Place on the Internet – 2026 book by Richard Cooke
- Timeline of Wikipedia–U.S. government conflicts
