= Wikiwix =

Internet search engine and web archive for French Wikipedia

Wikiwix is a web-based search engine that indexes and searches Wikipedia articles. It also provides a related archiving service that preserves snapshots of referenced web pages.

== Description ==
Wikiwix is not a wiki, as the name might suggest, but is a multilingual internet search engine operating independently of the Wikimedia Foundation. However, its search results are provided solely from the Wikipedia database. It also provides an archiving service which sees extensive use in the French Wikipedia.

The search engine is developed by a French company, Linterweb, which also provided sponsorship towards publishing Wikipedia 0.5 on DVD in 2007.

== Functionality ==
The search engine allows searching for texts, images and geographical names on maps (called "atlas", based on Google Maps) in 13 languages (Arabic, Danish, English, Finnish, French, German, Interlingua, Italian, Norwegian, Polish, Portuguese, Spanish, and Swedish).
