= Polish Wikipedia =

Polish-language edition of Wikipedia

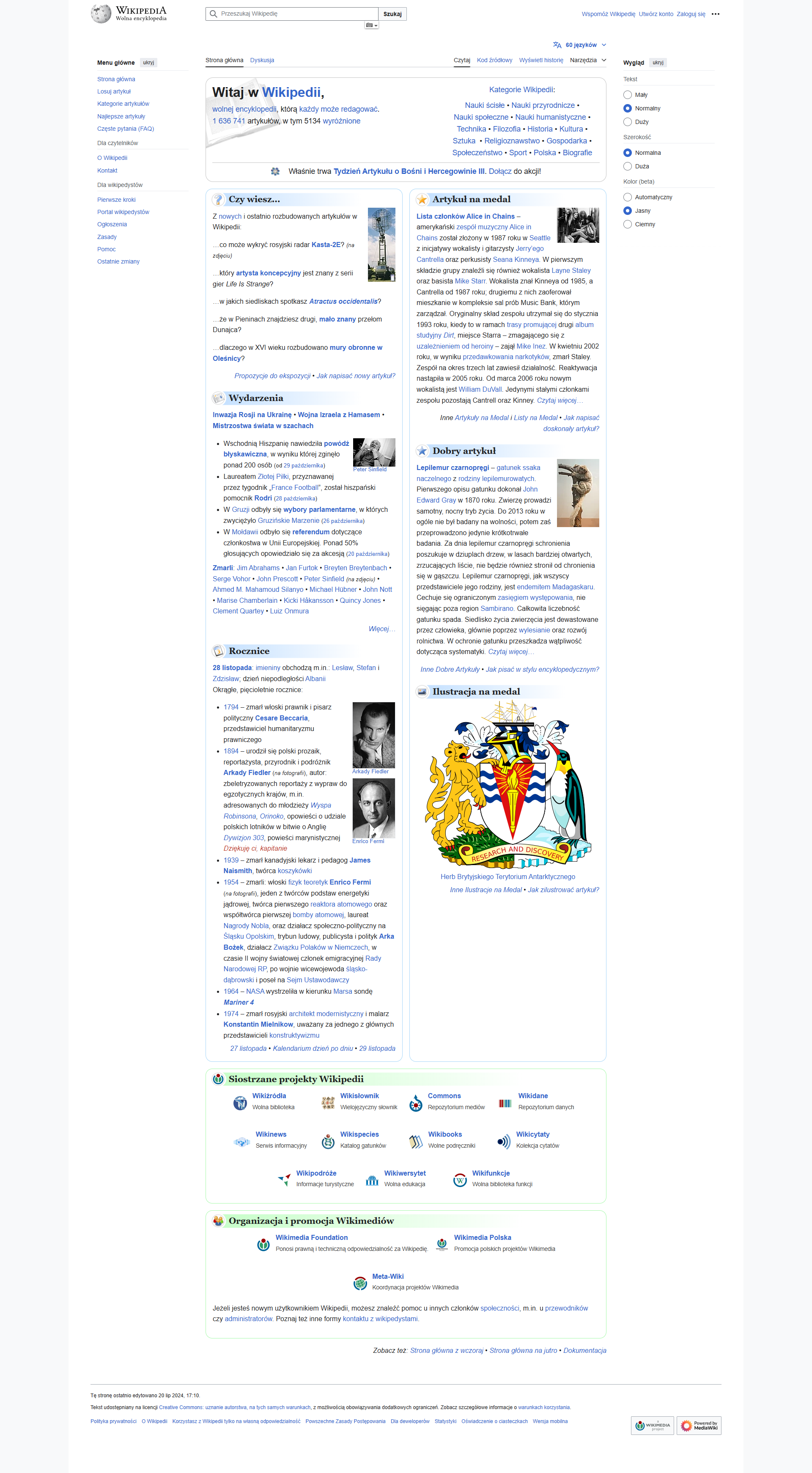
- Screenshot Main Page of the Polish Wikipedia in November 2024
- Website type: Internet encyclopedia project
- Available in: Polish
- Owner: Wikimedia Foundation
- Website: pl.wikipedia.org
- Commercial: No
- Registration: Optional
- Users: 1.62 million (as of 27 September 2026)
- Launched: 26 September 2001; 25 years ago
- Content license: Creative Commons Attribution/ Share-Alike 4.0 (most text also dual-licensed under GFDL); Media licensing varies

The Polish Wikipedia (Polish: Wikipedia polskojęzyczna) is the Polish-language edition of Wikipedia, a free online encyclopedia. Founded on 26 September 2001, it now has 1,709,234 articles, making it the 10th-largest Wikipedia edition overall. It is also the second-largest edition in a Slavic language, after the Russian Wikipedia, with 2,119,500 articles.

== History ==
The logo of the 10th anniversary celebration of the Polish Wikipedia

The Polish Wikipedia was created in September 2001 under the domain wiki.rozeta.com.pl. It was originally hosted by a server in a shoebox inside the wardrobe of one of its founders, Paweł Jochym. At the suggestion of the founders of the English Wikipedia, the site was incorporated into the international project as http://pl.wikipedia.com on 12 January 2002, and as http://pl.wikipedia.org on 22 November that year. To avoid domain squatting that could frustrate potential users, the Polish Wikipedia also has its own domain, wikipedia.pl, which redirects to pl.wikipedia.org.

On 27 January 2005, the founders of the Polish Wikipedia, Krzysztof P. Jasiutowicz and Paweł Jochym, received the Internet Citizen of the Year 2004 award issued by the Internet Obywatelski ("Public Internet") society.

In July 2005, the tsca.bot bot program was instructed to upload statistics from official government pages about French, Polish, and Italian municipalities to the Polish Wikipedia. In a few months, the bot uploaded more than 40,000 articles. On 13 October 2009, the Polish Wikipedia received a "special recognition for social innovation" at the 2009 Jan Łukasiewicz Award ceremony, which recognises the most innovative Polish IT companies. The Polish Wikipedia exceeded 1,000,000 articles on 24 September 2013. In April 2016, the project had 1,140 active editors who made at least five edits in that month.

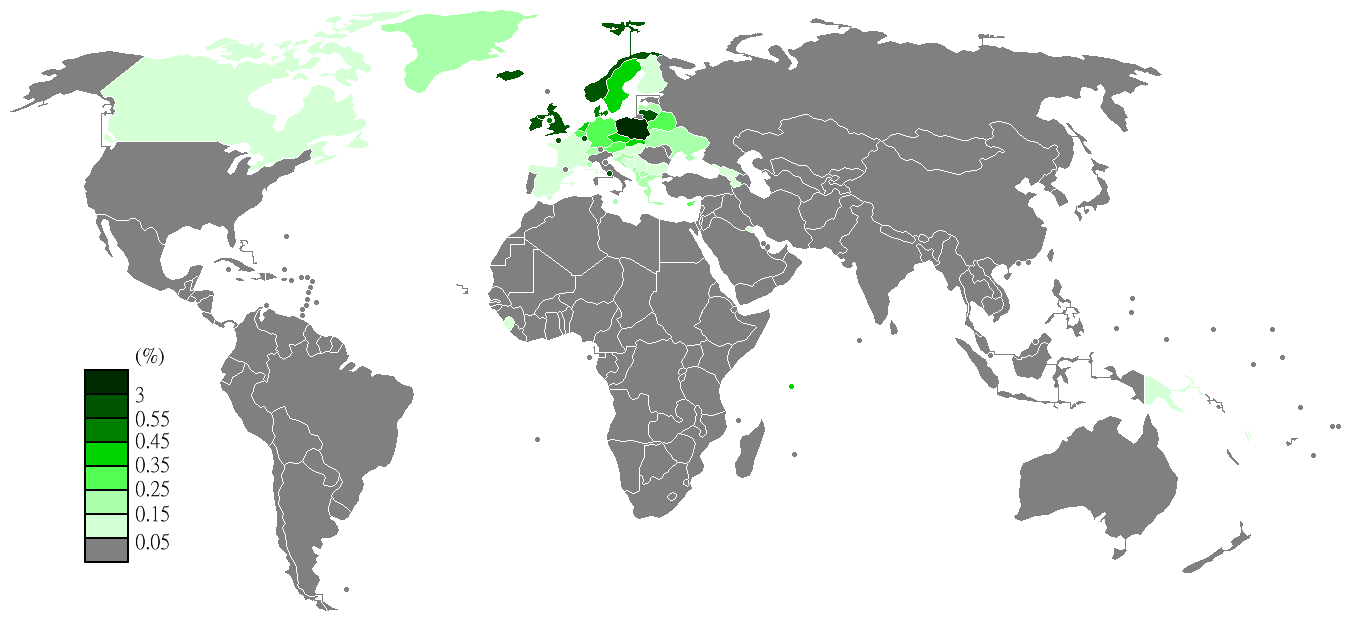
Polish Wikipedia page view ratio by country in 2011–2012

== Polish Wikipedia on DVD ==
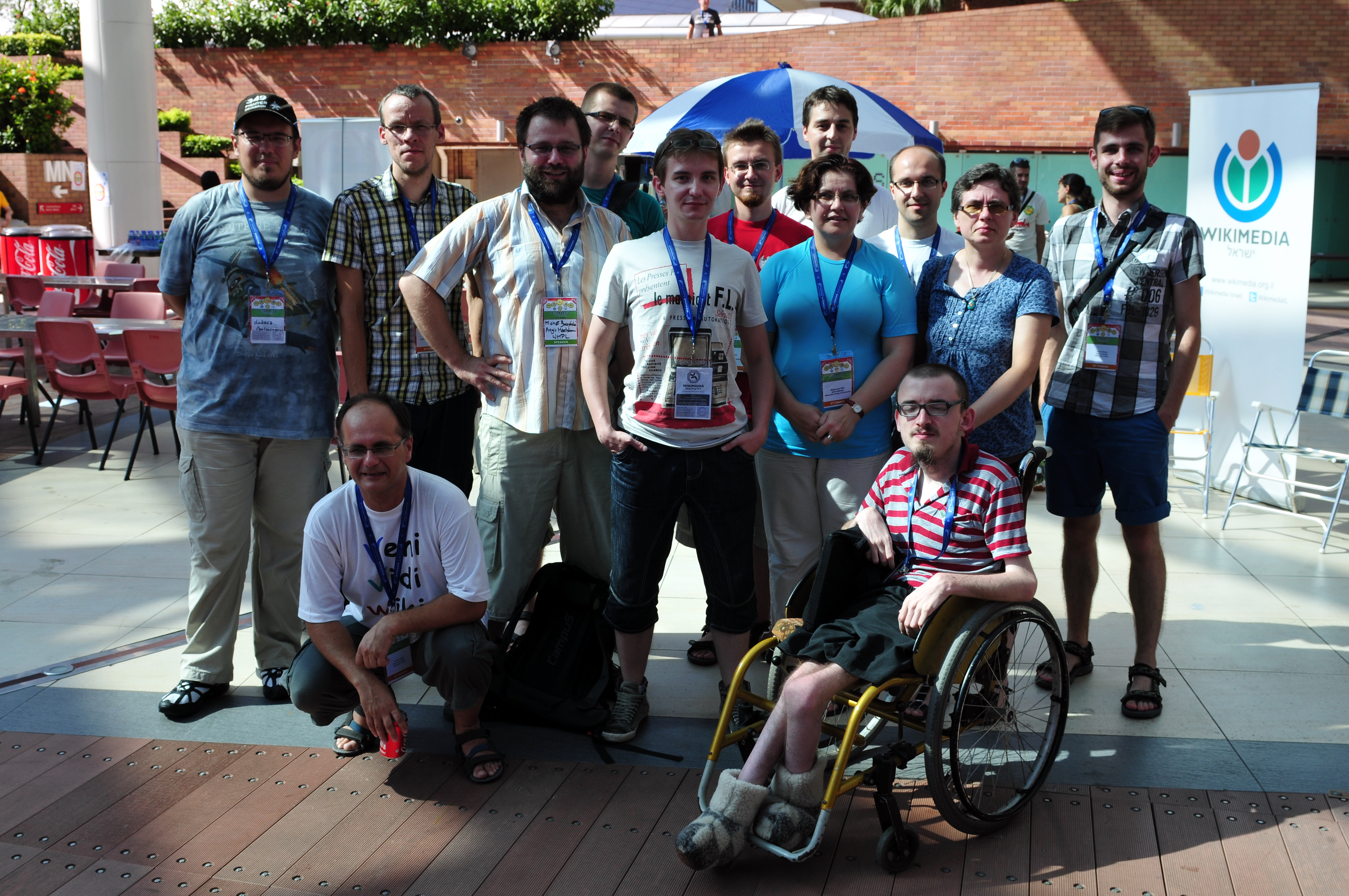
Polish Wikipedians at Wikimania 2013

The text of the Polish Wikipedia was first published on a DVD together with the paper edition of the magazine Enter SPECIAL in August 2005. The publisher did not make any attempt to contact the Wikimedia Foundation prior to making the DVD available on the market, and the edition itself turned out to be illegal, as it violated the GNU FDL license. Additionally, the software used on the DVD worked improperly on Microsoft Windows 98.

A second DVD edition was prepared as a joint project of Wikimedia Polska (the Polish branch of the Wikimedia Foundation) and the Polish publisher Helion. It contained articles written before 4 June 2006. The edition was completed on 24 November 2006, and released at the end of July 2007 with a purchase price of 39 zlotys.
