= Danish Wikipedia =

Danish-language edition of Wikipedia

- Website type: Internet encyclopedia project
- Available in: Danish
- Headquarters: Miami, Florida
- Owner: Wikimedia Foundation
- Website: da.wikipedia.org
- Commercial: No
- Registration: Optional
- Launched: 1 February 2002; 24 years ago
- Content license: Creative Commons Attribution/ Share-Alike 4.0 (most text also dual-licensed under GFDL); Media licensing varies

The Danish Wikipedia (Danish: Dansk Wikipedia) started on 1 February 2002 and is the Danish language edition of Wikipedia. As of September 2026, it has 316,048 articles and its article depth is 56.61.

== Task ==
One of the major tasks of Danish Wikipedia is to ensure that every Danish individual will be able to access, read and obtain information from Wikipedia. Danish Wikipedia is collaboratively edited and provides freely accessible encyclopedia articles for all, in Danish.

== Characteristics ==
Assessment symbol used by the Danish Wikipedia for promising articles

Symbol used for Articles of the Week

- No fair use: The Danish Wikipedia has no fair use provisions. No fair use claims are allowed and all images (except Wikimedia logos) must be available under a free license.
- Copyright law: Very few works are exempt from copyright under Danish law, and the number of images available from third-party sources is much lower than that for the English and German Wikipedias. Images exempt from copyright due to laws in the country of origin are accepted. Works by the Danish government are protected by copyright like other texts, with the exception of laws and legal texts. However, this exception does not apply to accompanying illustrations, since these can be considered "works appearing as independent contributions" in these texts. Government publications and Danish insignia are consequently protected by copyright similar to ordinary works. It is likely that the text of heraldic blazons is free, provided that they were printed in the National Gazette or Statstidende (though the text may be free, an accompanying illustration is not). Composite works and joint works are protected until 70 years after the death of the last-living contributor. All photos are protected by copyright for at least 50 years, and this protection is considered to also apply to photographs of works of art otherwise in the public domain. Photos with artistic merit are protected for 70 years p.m.a. No equivalent of Bridgeman v. Corel exists, but a similar situation exists for pre-1970 images, since simple photos published before 1 January 1970 are still regulated by the pre-1995 rules, which operated with a short protection span for such works. Freedom of panorama can be applied for images of buildings, but images of permanently installed works of art in public spaces are only exempt from copyright if such use is non-commercial. Photos of statues can consequently only be used on the Danish Wikipedia if the sculptor died more than 70 years ago. A notable work of art with this problem is the Little Mermaid statue.
- Commons: Files uploaded to the Danish Wikipedia must be used in article space within a week, or the file will be listed for deletion. This rule was introduced to discourage local uploads, given that all images used on the Danish Wikipedia are compatible with the requirements of Commons. Uploads to Commons are strongly encouraged.
- Article assessment: The Danish Wikipedia has not yet adopted ratings equivalent to the English Wikipedia's featured articles and A-grade. The highest grade is Anbefalede artikler (AA) (recommended articles), which is defined as an equivalent of the English Wikipedia's good articles grade. Raising an article to this level requires a process similar in form to the Featured Articles process on the English Wikipedia, and many criteria are similar. In addition, any article nominated for AA must previously have been elevated to Lovende artikler (LA) (promising articles)-grade. Categories equivalent to Stub-class, Start-class and B-class are also used. Anbefalede artikler are tagged with the GA symbol known from the English Wikipedia, and Lovende artikler are tagged with a blue version of the same symbol.
- Projects and portals: Wikiprojects and portals have both been introduced, inspired by the English Wikipedia. Examples are the History portal and "Shoot a Church", a project aimed at creating free images of Danish churches.
- GA task forces. The first AA-Taskforce was introduced in 2007. The goal is to elevate entire groups of articles to AA status. The idea is similar to the English Wikipedia's Featured topics, but article quality will be lower than on the English project. Two taskforces currently exist: Capitals of Europe and heavy metal music.
- Article of the Week: Ugens artikel (UA) features prominently on the front page for a single week. The article is selected by a vote and editors are strongly encouraged to improve it in the week leading up to its prominent display.
- Since Danish is mutually intelligible with Swedish and Norwegian, administrators of the site collaborate with those at the respective Wikipedias through the Skanwiki section of the Wikimedia Meta-Wiki site.

Wikimedia Danmark is a Danish membership association with the purpose to support Wikimedia's projects, in particular those in the Danish, Faroese and Greenlandic languages, and aiming to become a national chapter of the Wikimedia Foundation. The association was formed at a meeting at the Unitarerneshuset in Copenhagen on 14 March 2009. The Wikimedia Foundation approved the chapter on 3 July 2009. The current chairman is Ole Andersen.

== See also ==
- Norwegian Wikipedia
- Swedish Wikipedia
- Finnish Wikipedia
