= Swahili Wikipedia =

Swahili-language edition of Wikipedia

- Website type: Internet encyclopedia project
- Available in: Swahili
- Owner: Wikimedia Foundation
- Website: sw.wikipedia.org
- Commercial: No
- Registration: Optional
- Content license: Creative Commons Attribution/ Share-Alike 4.0 (most text also dual-licensed under GFDL). Media licensing varies.

The Swahili Wikipedia (Swahili: Wikipedia ya Kiswahili) is the Swahili language edition of Wikipedia. It is the largest edition of Wikipedia in a Niger–Congo language, followed by the Yoruba Wikipedia.

It was mentioned on 27 August 2006, in International Herald Tribune and New York Newsday articles on the struggles of smaller Wikipedia language editions. In 2009, Google sponsored the creation of articles in the Swahili Wikipedia. On 20 June 2009, the Swahili Wikipedia gave its main page a makeover. As of September 2026, it has about 127,000 articles, making it the 71st-largest Wikipedia.

The Swahili Wikipedia is the second most popular Wikipedia in Tanzania and Kenya after the English version with respectively 14% and 4% of the visits, as of January 2021.

Swahili Wikipedia statistics
Number of user accounts	Number of articles	Number of files	Number of administrators
91,151	127,447	1,211	14
