= Norwegian Wikipedias =

Norwegian-language editions of Wikipedia

Norwegian Wikipedia Norsk Wikipedia

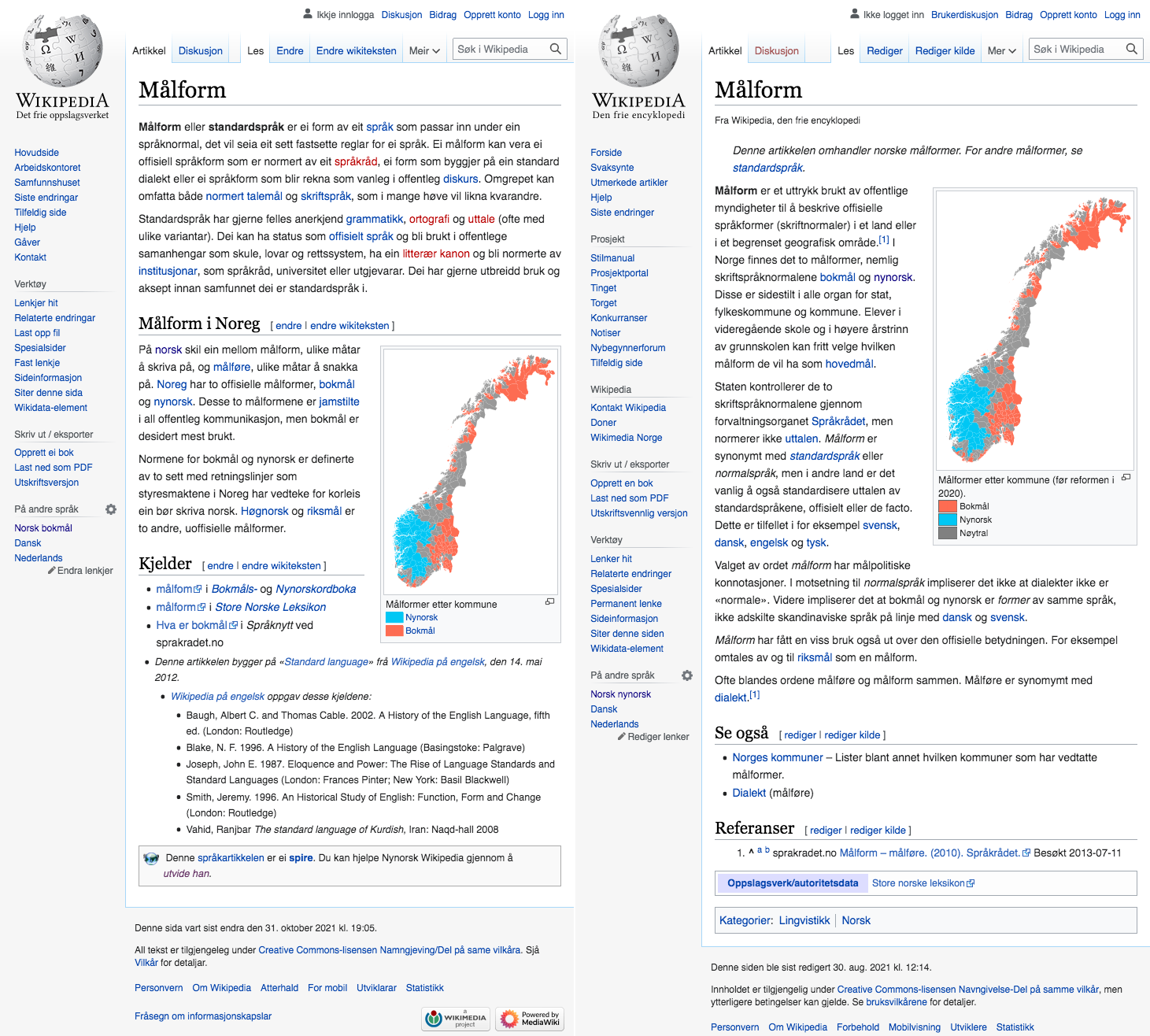
- Nynorsk [nn] (left) and Bokmål/Riksmål [no] editions of Wikipedia side-by-side
- Website type: Online encyclopedia
- Available in: Bokmål/Riksmål; Nynorsk/Høgnorsk
- Owner: Wikimedia Foundation
- Creator: Norwegian wiki community
- Website: no.wikipedia.org nn.wikipedia.org
- Commercial: No
- Launched: 26 November 2001; 24 years ago (Bokmål); 31 July 2004; 22 years ago (Nynorsk)
- Content license: Creative Commons Attribution/ Share-Alike 4.0 (most text also dual-licensed under GFDL); Media licensing varies

Norwegian Wikipedia (Norwegian: Norsk Wikipedia) is the Norwegian-language Wikipedia. There are two Norwegian language editions of Wikipedia: one for articles written in Bokmål (or Riksmål), and one for articles written in Nynorsk (or Høgnorsk). There are currently 691,783 articles on the Norwegian Wikipedia edition in Bokmål/Riksmål, and 180,532 articles on the Nynorsk edition.

== Timeline ==
- no.wikipedia.com (from August 2002 no.wikipedia.org) — a Wikipedia in Norwegian (specified to be Norwegian Bokmål/Riksmål in 2005) was established on 26 November 2001.
- nn.wikipedia.org — a Wikipedia in Norwegian Nynorsk, was established on 31 July 2004.

== History ==
The first site, the original Norwegian Wikipedia (Norsk Wikipedia), launched on 26 November 2001, and originally did not specify which written standard could/should be used, although de facto almost all the articles were written in Bokmål/Riksmål. The Norwegian Wikipedia originally had the address no.wikipedia.com, but in August 2002 all Wikipedia editions moved from the wikipedia.com domain to the wikipedia.org domain, shortly after Jimmy Wales had announced that Wikipedia would never have commercial advertisements.

A Nynorsk-specific Wikipedia was launched on 31 July 2004, and grew quickly. Following a vote in 2005, the main Norwegian site became Bokmål and Riksmål only.

By February 2007, the Bokmål/Riksmål edition had over 100,000 articles and the Nynorsk site had over 20,000 articles. In February 2006, the Bokmål/Riksmål edition became the thirteenth Wikipedia to have more than 50,000 articles, and one year later it was the fourteenth to reach 100,000. After the Finnish Wikipedia surpassed it in April 2006 it was once again the 14th largest Wikipedia by article count. However, in September 2007, the Bokmål/Riksmål Wikipedia surpassed the Finnish, and has since then been the 13th largest Wikipedia. As of 1 June 2010, the Bokmål/Riksmål contains more than 260,000 articles, while the Nynorsk edition contains over 57,000. Norwegian, Danish, and Swedish are mutually intelligible languages and can be understood by most speakers of each. The sites collaborate with the other Scandinavian Wikipedias through the Skanwiki section of the Wikimedia Foundation's Meta-Wiki site. One effect of this combined effort is the sharing of their weekly featured front-page articles among these four different Wikipedias.

Although the ISO 639 two-letter code for Bokmål is nb, the Bokmål/Riksmål Norwegian Wikipedia continues to be hosted at no.wikipedia.org, while the narrower nb code redirects to that site. The Nynorsk code is nn, and the Nynorsk Wikipedia is hosted at nn.wikipedia.org.

On 9 April 2013, the Nynorsk Wikipedia passed 100,000 articles.

Wikimedia Norge is a Norwegian private membership association with the purpose to support Wikimedia's projects, in particular those in Norwegian and Sami languages. The association was formed at a meeting at the National Library in Oslo on 23 June 2007. However, it has no formal role in relation to the Norwegian Wikipedia projects.

The Norwegian Wikipedia was launched on 29 November 2001, and initially there were no precise rules governing the writing of articles in a particular dialect. The development of the section led to the decision to launch a separate section in Nynorsk, which happened on 31 July 2004.

On 7 August 2005, the 10,000th article, Edvard Langset, was written.

In April 2007, Noregs Mållag, an organization dedicated to the promotion of Nynorsk, donated 50,000 Norwegian kroner to the administrator and bureaucrat of the section Ranveig Mossige Thattai for the development of the Nynorsk section.

On 22 August 2007 the number of articles had exceeded 25,000. The number of registered participants by that time had reached almost 3,000.

On 13 February 2008 the number of articles exceeded 30,000, while the 150,000th article was created in the Bokmål section on 30 January of the same year. The number of registered contributors to the Nynorsk Wikipedia by that time had reached 3,377.

The contributors to the Nynorsk Wikipedia used Apertium to perform machine translation between Nynorsk and Bokmål, and also collaborated with Wikipedia sections in other continental Scandinavian languages as part of the Skanwiki meta-project.

== See also ==
- Danish Wikipedia
- Swedish Wikipedia
- Icelandic Wikipedia
- Faroese Wikipedia
- Finnish Wikipedia
