= Afrikaans Wikipedia =

Afrikaans-language edition of Wikipedia

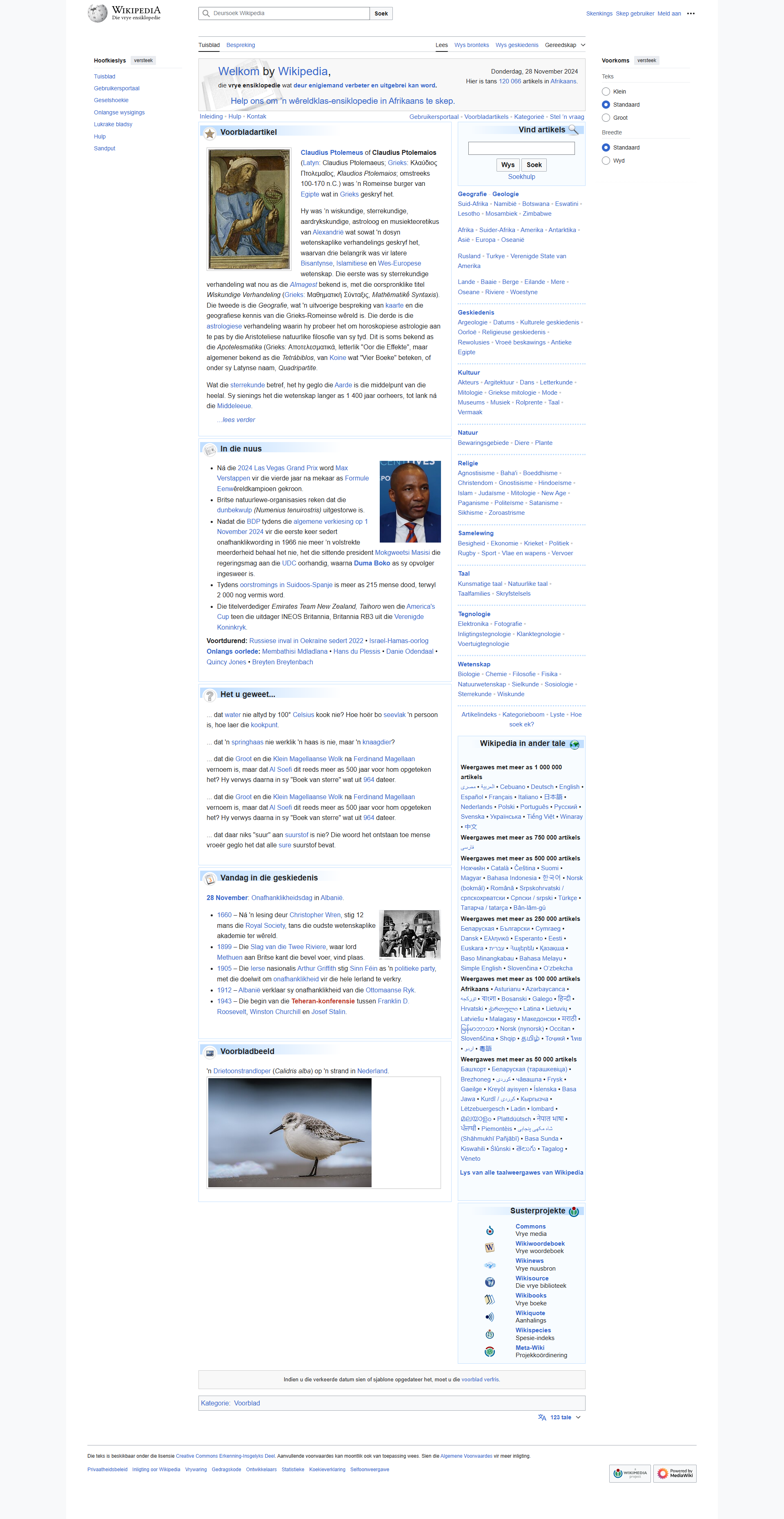
- Screenshot Main Page of the Afrikaans Wikipedia in November 2024
- Website type: Internet encyclopedia project
- Available in: Afrikaans
- Owner: Wikimedia Foundation
- Website: af.wikipedia.org
- Registration: Optional
- Launched: 16 November 2001; 24 years ago
- Content license: Creative Commons Attribution/ Share-Alike 4.0 (most text also dual-licensed under GFDL); Media licensing varies

An infographic illustrating key figures about Afrikaans Wikipedia when it was made in July 2015 and displayed at Wikimania in Mexico City.

The Afrikaans Wikipedia (Afrikaans: Afrikaanse Wikipedia) is the Afrikaans edition of the Web-based free-content encyclopedia Wikipedia. This Wikipedia was created on 16 November 2001 and it was the 16th Wikipedia to be created, meaning among the first. In December 2016 it was the 84th largest Wikipedia by number of articles. As of 19 September 2026, it has 131,009 articles and is the 69th-largest Wikipedia.

Apart from South Africa and Namibia, the Afrikaans Wikipedia is used and maintained by users in Europe, North America and Oceania.

== Visits and edits ==
The Afrikaans Wikipedia makes up 0.008% of all Wikipedia searches. In the period of time between 1 July 2009 and 30 September 2013, the Afrikaans Wikipedia was visited the most by

South Africa (64.0%)
USA (5.5%)
Germany (4.1%)
World (26.4%)

The Afrikaans Wikipedia makes up 2.2% of all searches in South Africa, after the 92.7% of the English Wikipedia. In Namibia, the Afrikaans Wikipedia is used 1.2% of the time, after the English (85.3%), German (5.7%) and Portuguese (1.5%) Wikipedias.

0.1% of all German, 0.3% of all Belgian and 24.4% of all South African edits take place on the Afrikaans Wikipedia. Netherlands and Belgium's involvement in the Afrikaans Wikipedia is most likely due to the language relationship between Afrikaans and Dutch.

== Milestones ==
According to statistics, the following milestones were reached by the Afrikaans Wikipedia:

Graph of the number of articles on the Afrikaans Wikipedia

Number of articles	Date
First article	November 2001
100 articles	April 2003
500 articles	November 2003
1 000 articles	January 2004
2 500 articles	March 2004
5 000 articles	March 2006
9 000 articles	29 December 2007
10 000 articles	June 2008
15 000 articles	7 May 2010
20 000 articles	11 November 2011
25 000 articles	27 November 2012
28 000 articles	7 August 2013
30 000 articles	21 January 2014
31 000 articles	14 April 2014
32 000 articles	5 July 2014
33 000 articles	14 September 2014
34 000 articles	4 January 2015
35 000 articles	5 April 2015
36 000 articles	16 July 2015
37 000 articles	13 September 2015
38 000 articles	17 December 2015
39 000 articles	28 February 2016
40 000 articles	5 May 2016
41 000 articles	8 August 2016
42 000 articles	14 October 2016
43 000 articles	14 December 2016
44 000 articles	5 March 2017
45 000 articles	28 May 2017
46 000 articles	17 July 2017
47 000 articles	20 September 2017
48 000 articles	18 December 2017
49 000 articles	28 February 2018
50 000 articles	15 June 2018
55 000 articles	30 August 2018
60 000 articles	24 September 2018
65 000 articles	5 November 2018
70 000 articles	6 February 2019
75 000 articles	10 March 2019
80 000 articles	1 June 2019
85 000 articles	11 October 2019
90 000 articles	21 April 2020
95 000 articles	27 November 2020
100 000 articles	8 September 2021
105 000 articles	19 October 2022
110 000 articles	13 August 2023
115 000 articles	29 February 2024
120 000 articles	18 November 2024
121 000 articles	31 December 2024
