= Latvian Wikipedia =

Latvian-language edition of Wikipedia

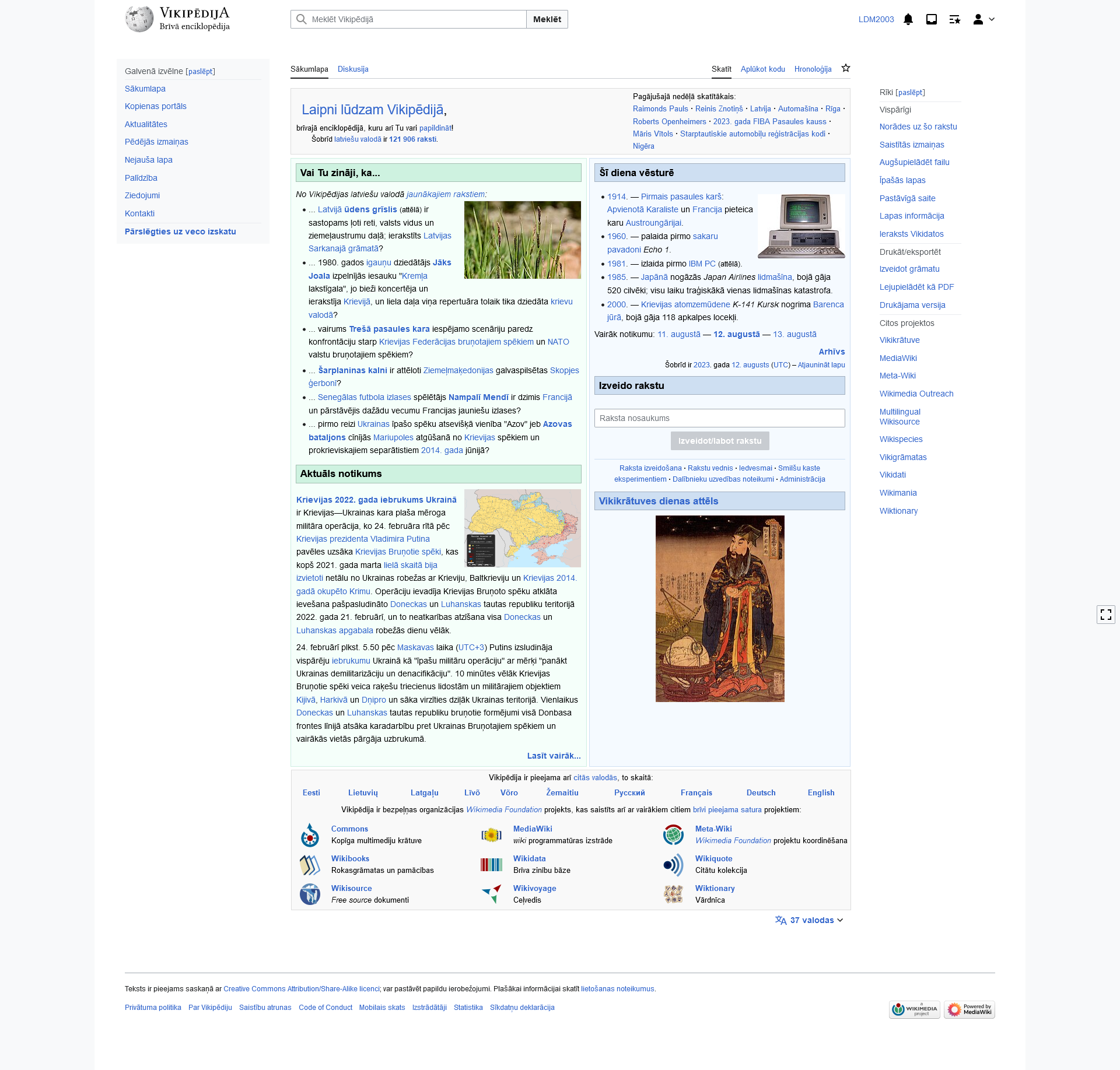
- Screenshot Screenshot of the main page of the Latvian Wikipedia on 12 August 2023
- Website type: Online encyclopedia
- Available in: Latvian
- Owner: Wikimedia Foundation
- Website: lv.wikipedia.org
- Commercial: No
- Registration: Optional
- Users: 149,367 registered accounts 2,192 contributors (Note: Contributors are users who edited at least 10 times since they registered.) (Dec 2018); 14 administrators
- Launched: 6 June 2003; 23 years ago
- Content license: Creative Commons Attribution/ Share-Alike 4.0 (most text also dual-licensed under GFDL); Media licensing varies

The Latvian Wikipedia (Latvian: Vikipēdija latviešu valodā [ˈvikipɜːdija]) is the Latvian-language edition of the free online encyclopedia Wikipedia. It was created on 6 June 2003. With 145,940 articles, it is currently the 66th-largest Wikipedia as measured by the number of articles and the second-largest Wikipedia in a Baltic language, after the Lithuanian Wikipedia, which is the 54th-largest with 226,751 articles.

As of February 2021, it was the most visited language Wikipedia in Latvia. It ranked before the Russian Wikipedia and the English Wikipedia.

== History ==
The Latvian Wikipedia was created alongside the Serbian, Kannada, Walloon, Wolof, and Xhosa Wikipedias. The oldest article is "Psihologija", which was published on 6 June 2003 and redirected to "Psiholoģija" (psychology) on 7 December 2004. The main page was added four months after the first article, on 6 October 2003.

The edition's initial growth was slow and some articles about important aspects of Latvian culture were missing at first. The article about Jāņi, for instance, was not written until March 2008. The Latvian Wikipedia's growth rate has been very stable since 2006.

On 30 September 2013, the VisualEditor was made available to logged-in users, and by 7 October 2013, it was available to all users on the Latvian Wikipedia.

The Latvian Wikipedia turned 10 years old on 6 June 2013. A commemorative logo was uploaded for the occasion, and small parties among the community's "Wikiholics" ensued, as it is customary whenever a new milestone is reached. The edition surpassed 50,000 articles on 17 August 2013.

=== Name and logo ===
On 22 September 2004, the first Latvian "Wikipēdija" logo was uploaded, and on 1 June 2005, the name was changed to "Vikipēdija". In Latvian media, the words "Wikipedia" and "Vikipēdija" are used interchangeably to refer to both Wikipedia in general and to the Latvian edition specifically, but "Vikipēdija" is more common.

In response to the Zolitūde shopping centre roof collapse disaster of 21 November 2013, the Latvian Wikipedia, just as several other Latvian websites, changed its logo for three days to include black and the image of a candle.

=== Related projects ===
A separate Latgalian Wikipedia (ltg) was created on 18 March 2011. Latgalian is spoken in Latgale, the eastern part of Latvia, and its standardized form is recognized and protected as a variety of Latvian language by Latvian law, although it is debated whether it is a dialect of Latvian or a separate language.

Neciklopēdija, the Latvian edition of Uncyclopedia, is a satirical website created on 30 November 2005 to parody the Latvian Wikipedia. An article outlining the internal politics between the Latvian Wikipedia's administrators and its most active users was written on 10 March 2011.

Since 11 June 2014, a "!Bang" command on DuckDuckGo gives users the ability to redirect search queries to the Latvian Wikipedia by typing !wlv in their browser's URL bar.

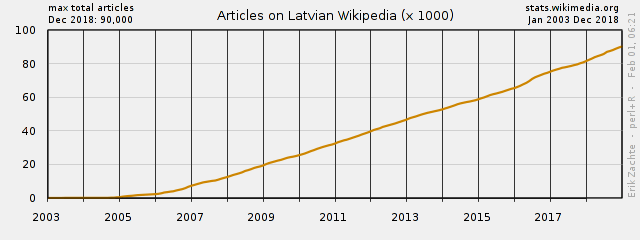
Statistic of number of articles on the Latvian Wikipedia

=== Milestones ===
- 2003-06-06 — 1 article
- 2004-12-28 — 500 articles
- 2005-03-05 — 1,000 articles
- 2005-10-15 — 2,500 articles
- 2006-09-07 — 5,000 articles
- 2007-07-19 — 10,000 articles
- 2009-02-13 — 20,000 articles
- 2010-09-19 — 30,000 articles
- 2012-02-19 — 40,000 articles
- 2013-08-17& — 50,000 articles
- 2015-03-03 — 60,000 articles
- 2016-06-19 — 70,000 articles
- 2017-11-17 — 80,000 articles
- 2018-12-27 — 90,000 articles
- 2020-01-24 — 100,000 articles
- 2021-12-16 — 110,000 articles
- 2023-05-19 — 120,000 articles
- 2024-09-26 — 130,000 articles
- 2025-12-27 — 140,000 articles

=== Latvian Wikipedia Marathon ===
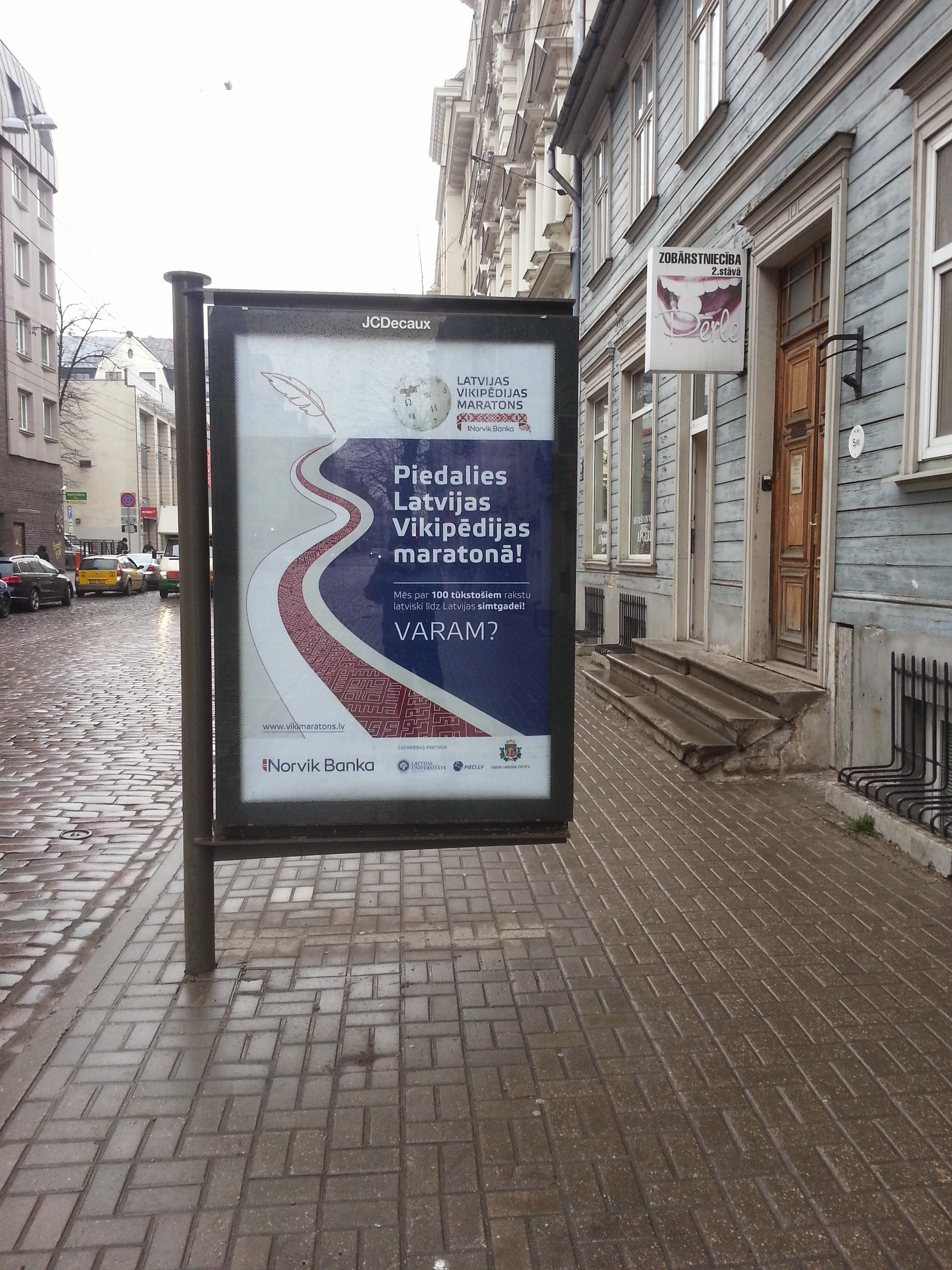
Poster of Latvian Wikipedia Marathon in Riga

The Latvian Wikipedia Marathon (Latvian: Latvijas Vikipēdijas maratons) was a project that brought together the Latvian Wikipedia community with several private partners in a joint effort with the aim of expanding the Latvian Wikipedia to activate the usability of the Latvian language in the learning process, cognition and research work.

== Policies ==
Since 31 October 2012, the Latvian Wikipedia displays a notice encouraging users to sign a petition on the Latvian social initiative platform ManaBalss.lv in an effort to change the Latvian copyright law, which permits taking pictures of architectural works and monuments, but only for non-commercial purposes. According to the petition, "such restrictions are not reasonable for buildings, monuments, sculptures and other three-dimensional works that cannot be fully reproduced in two dimensions". If the law changed, pictures of Latvian public buildings would become valid on Wikimedia Commons.

- As opposed to the English Wikipedia, it is not required to be logged-in to create a new article on the Latvian Wikipedia.
- Many users use personalized license templates on the images they upload locally to have them grouped.
- Unlike most major Wikipedias, the Latvian Wikipedia adopted gadgets very late, in May 2014.

=== Images ===
The Latvian Wikipedia has an Exemption Doctrine Policy (Godprātīga lietošana) that allows local uploads of non-free, fair use images and audio/video files (with copyright restrictions). However, users are encouraged to release their work under a Creative Commons license and upload it on Wikimedia Commons instead, thus making it accessible throughout all editions of Wikipedia. This stance is similar to the English Wikipedia's, and in contrast to some other editions, which rely strictly on Wikimedia Commons for images, sound, and other media files, including i.a. the Spanish, Swedish, Polish, Basque, Czech, Danish, Volapük and Latin Wikipedias.

Content and images from the Latvian Wikipedia often appear on Latvian news websites.

== Statistics ==
Baltic Wikipedias' article share (Sep 2026)
Lithuanian	58%
Latvian	37.3%
Samogitian	4.4%
Latgalian	0.3%

As of September 2026, the Latvian Wikipedia's 146,000 articles account for approximately 37% of all the articles written in a Baltic language, an increase from 24% in 2014. This makes it the second-largest edition in the family after Lithuanian, which accounts for 58%. In 2018, the most popular articles were "Latvija" (Latvia), "2018. gada Pasaules čempionāts hokejā" (2018 IIHF World Championship), and "Rīga", the capital of Latvia.

As of November 2019, the Latvian Wikipedia had 49 featured articles (vērtīgi raksti) and a moderate ratio of 0.5 featured articles per 1000 articles, 110 good articles (labi raksti), 19 featured lists (vērtīgi saraksti), and 18 Wikiprojects (Vikiprojekts).

As of September 2026, 166 articles on the English Wikipedia could be expanded by translating from the Latvian Wikipedia.

It currently has a moderately high depth indicator of 68.9, (Note: Depth is a rough indicator of a Wikipedia's collaborative quality showing how frequently its articles are updated. A higher depth usually indicates that articles are more often edited.) which is greater than other than that of Wikipedias in other Baltic languages (Note: The Latgalian, Lithuanian, and Samogitian Wikipedias have a depth indicator of 40.1, 6.6, and 31.5 respectively.) and some of the largest editions including Polish (38.1), Dutch (20), and Swedish (19).

As of November 2019, according to the list of Wikipedias by sample of articles at Meta-Wiki, which is based on the list of articles every Wikipedia should have, the Latvian Wikipedia ranked 60th out of 295 editions, with a score of 23.18/100. It lacked no article from the list of vital articles, but contained three times more stubs than articles.

=== Community ===
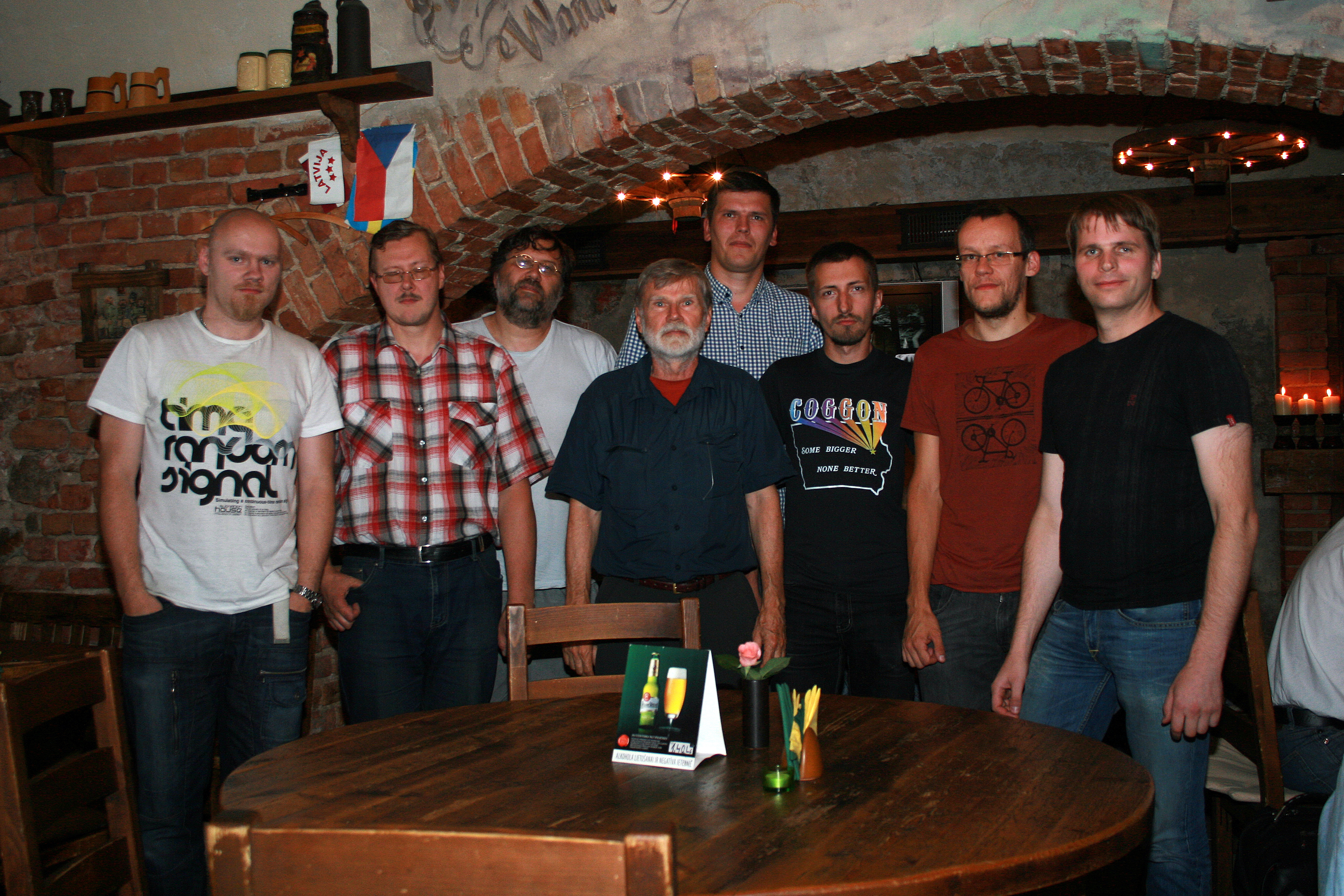
Some of the most active contributors to the Latvian Wikipedia in 2013. From left to right: Laurijs, ScAvenger, Feens, IndulisMX, Treisijs, GreenZeb, Papuass, and Dainis.

Although there is still no Wikimedia chapter in Latvia, the Wikimedia Foundation officially recognized the Wikimedians of Latvia User Group (Latvian: Latvijas vikimedisti) on 5 March 2015. It is an active user group representing all Wikimedians in Latvia.

In 2014, the Latvian Wikipedia was the third most read edition in Latvia, after the English Wikipedia and the Russian Wikipedia. It is also the seventh most read edition on the island of Guernsey, where there is an emerging Latvian diaspora of approximately 1,500 to 2,000 migrant workers. Despite Latvian having less than 2 million speakers, the edition enjoys a relatively high level of community participation, with 54 editors per million speakers.

At around 73 articles per thousand speakers, the Latvian Wikipedia has an above-average number of articles per speaker. These figures were based on an estimate of 1.8 million speakers of Latvian. Its editing community currently consists of 14 administrators (2.86% of all active users) and 490 active contributors, of which on average between 12 and 20 are very active every month, (Note: A very active user is one with 100+ edits in the main namespace of a given project over the last 30 days.) and there are in total 62 users with over 1,000 edits (excluding bots), and 20 approved bots, assisting users in the editing process. Around 90% of both views and edits originate from Latvia, where Wikipedia is the 12th most visited website.

== Gallery ==
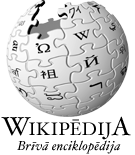
The Latvian Wikipedia's original logo. Note that "Wikipēdija" was spelled with a 'W' from 22 September 2004 to 1 June 2005

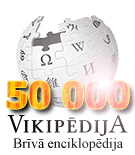
The Latvian Wikipedia's 50,000 articles commemorative logo (17 August 2013)

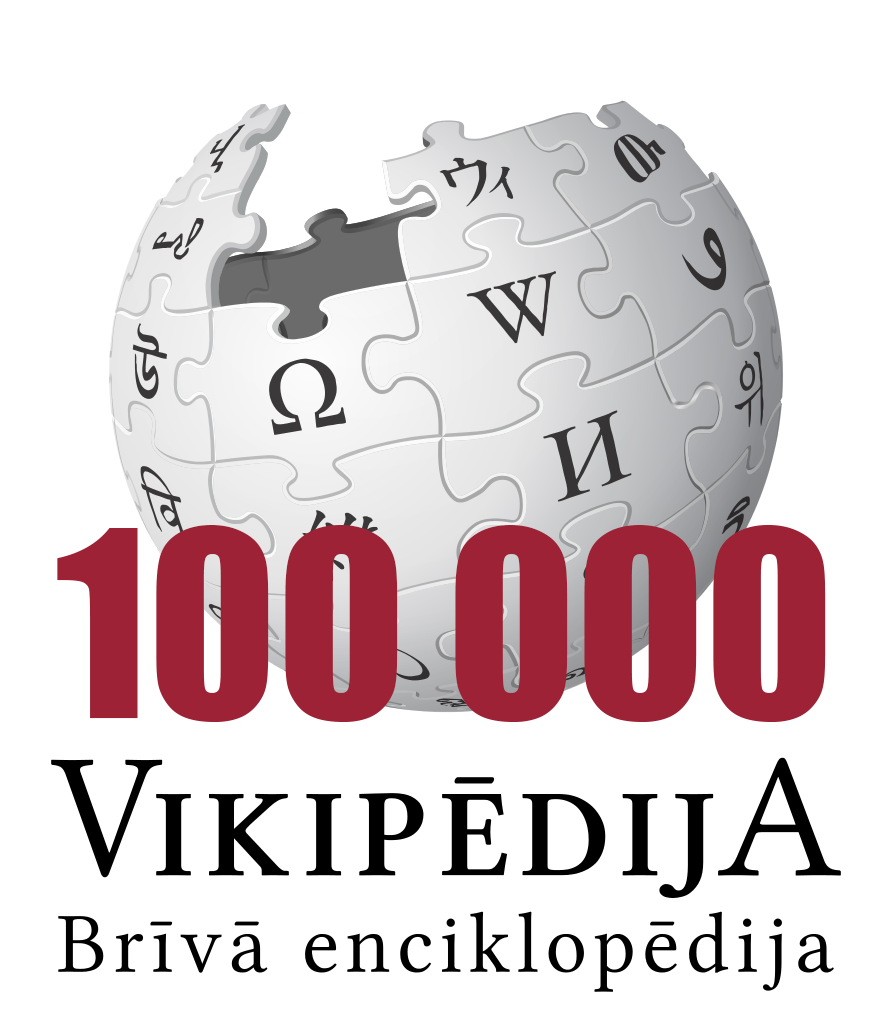
The Latvian Wikipedia's 100,000 articles commemorative logo (24 January 2020)

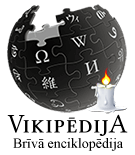
The logo displayed in memory of the victims of the Zolitūde shopping centre roof collapse (23–26 November 2013)

== See also ==
- List of Wikipedias
