= Radio Musical Nacional =

Havana; Cuba
- Frequencies: See #Frequencies
- Branding: CMBF Radio Musical Nacional

Programming
- Language: Spanish
- Format: Classical music

Ownership
- Owner: Cuban Institute of Information and Social Communication

History
- First air date: 1933

Links
- Webcast: icecast.teveo.cu
- Website: cmbfradio.cu

Radio Musical Nacional (English: Musical National Radio), call sign CMBF, is a national classical music radio station in Cuba. It is heard on 590 kHz AM and 95.1 and 99.1 MHz FM in Havana and on FM transmitters nationwide. It is operated by the Institute of Information and Social Communication (IICS).

The station was started in 1933. It adopted its present programming as Onda Musical del Circuito CMQ (English: CMQ Network Musical Wave), a station dedicated to classical music. After the Cuban Revolution, the station was nationalized in 1960 and became a national radio service.

== History ==
=== CMBF (1933–1948) ===
CMBF began broadcasting in 1933 and was owned by Ángel Cambó and Miguel Gabriel. It was reallocated to 1560 kHz in 1938 and moved successively to 1260 and 950 kHz.

By 1947, CMBF was a 250-watt station. Goar Mestre, owner of the CMQ radio network, acquired it that year for $15,000. The station at that time became Radio Reloj, with a time-and-advertising format inspired by XEQK in Mexico City.

=== CMBF Onda Musical del Circuito CMQ (1948–1961) ===
Onda Musical del Circuito CMQ began broadcasting on April 25, 1948. It was started by pianist and music researcher Orlando Martínez Acosta (Havana, October 17, 1916 – September 18, 1988), the Conservatorio Hubert de Blanck and the Sociedad Pro-Arte Musical. The station broadcast classical music; for its foundation, Martínez was honored by the Italian government in 1958.

== Since 1961: CMBF Radio Musical Nacional ==
After the Cuban Revolution, CMBF was nationalized in 1960. It became a national network in October 1961 and was renamed CMBF Radio Musical Nacional. With the expanded coverage area, the station added more informational programming as well as cultural promotion and Cuban music. In 2000, it began streaming on the internet.

== Frequencies ==
Location	Call sign	Power [kW]	AM frequency [kHz]	FM frequency [MHz]
Bayamo				92.7
Camagüey				97.5
Ciego de Ávila				91.5
Cienfuegos				92.7
Guantánamo				98.7
Havana	CMBF		590	95.1 and 99.1
Holguín (Cacocum)				105.7
Las Tunas				98.3
Matanzas			1400	93.7
Nueva Gerona				96.7
Pinar del Río				99.7
Sancti Spíritus			1300	93.9
Santa Clara			1140	100.7
Santiago de Cuba				100.3

== Sources ==
- CMBF Radio Musical Nacional in Ecured
