= Catalan Wikipedia =

Catalan-language edition of Wikipedia

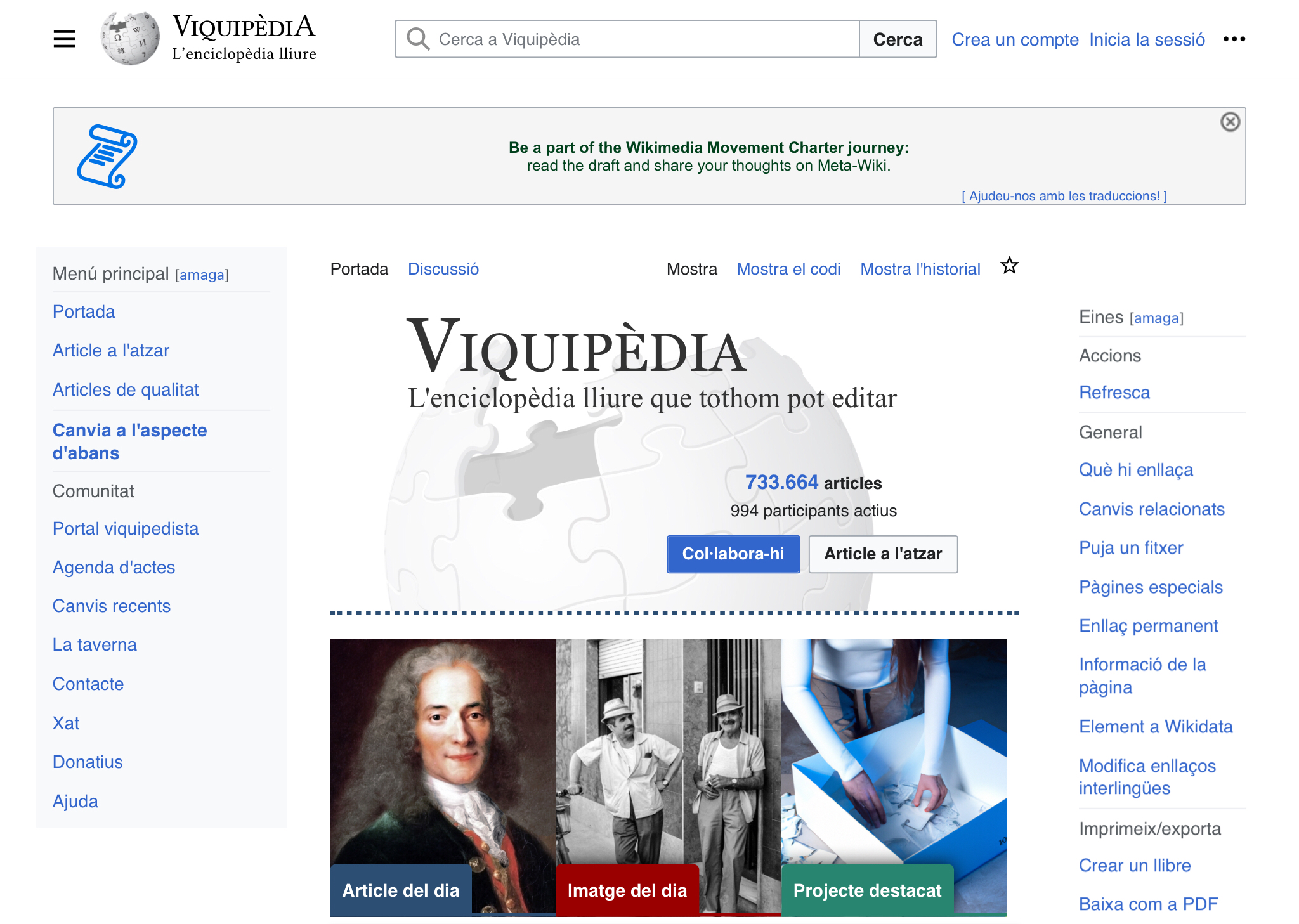
- Main Page of the Catalan Wikipedia in August 2023
- Website type: Online encyclopedia
- Available in: Catalan
- Owner: Wikimedia Foundation
- Website: ca.wikipedia.org
- Commercial: No
- Registration: Optional
- Users: 586,256 registered accounts 9,638 contributors (Note: Contributors are users who edited at least 10 times since they registered.) (July 2014)
- Launched: 16 March 2001; 25 years ago
- Content license: Creative Commons Attribution/ Share-Alike 4.0 (most text also dual-licensed under GFDL); Media licensing varies

The Catalan Wikipedia (Catalan: Viquipèdia en català) is the Catalan-language edition of the Wikipedia free online encyclopedia. It was created on 16 March 2001, just a few minutes after the first non-English Wikipedia, the German edition. For two months it was the only active one to have articles in a language other than English, while the German version remained dormant.

With 804,193 articles, it is the 21st-largest Wikipedia and the fifth-largest Wikipedia in a Romance language. In April 2016, the project had 582 active editors who made at least five edits in that month.

== Creation ==
On 16 March 2001, Jimmy Wales announced that he wanted to create Wikipedias in other languages and mentioned that there was interest in creating a Catalan version. The first tests were made on the deutsche.wikipedia.com, and a few minutes later, the Catalan Wikipedia was created in the catalan.wikipedia.com domain.

The first edit on a non-English Wikipedia was at 21:07 UTC, 16 March 2001, made to the Catalan main page. The first contribution in a non-English article dates from 17 March at 01:41 UTC in the article Àbac. Despite being created after the German Wikipedia, for about two months it was the only non-English Wikipedia that contained articles.

After some time, the domain changed to ca.wikipedia.com and later to ca.wikipedia.org. About 2003 its community started to use the name "Viquipèdia" when talking about this edition of Wikipedia. Nowadays, this word is used in Catalan language to refer to the whole Wikipedia. About 2005, the domain www.viquipedia.net was registered and it redirects to ca.wikipedia.org. In 2007, www.viquipedia.cat was also registered and redirected.

The first registered user was probably AstroNomer, presumably used only to make some registration tests, but the first registered user to make lasting contributions was Cdani, the same user cited in Jimbo Wales' message.

In 2005 the Catalan Wikipedia community debated on which name(s) of the Catalan language to present in the main page and other policy pages, either català, "Catalan", valencià, "Valencian", or a combination of both català-valencià and català o valencià. Although there was not a consensus on any of the proposals, users agreed that in articles relevant to the Valencian Community, the name "Valencian" was to be used; on all other articles "Catalan" is preferred. The main page avoids making reference to a particular nomenclature, by simply stating aquesta versió, "this version".

== Milestones and historical main pages ==
Milestone	Date	Article
1 article	17 March 2001	Àbac (Abacus)
10,000 articles	16 November 2004	Unknown
20,000 articles	19 November 2005	Diputat (Member of Parliament)
30,000 articles	6 May 2006	Lunitari (Lunitari)
40,000 articles	20 September 2006	Enginyeria d'aliments (Food engineering)
50,000 articles	4 January 2007	Puerto Real (Puerto Real)
75,000 articles	31 August 2007	Eutidem (filòsof) (Euthydemus (Socratic literature))
100,000 articles	18 January 2008	Arrel cúbica (Cubic root)
125,000 articles	12 August 2008	Llúdria gegant (Giant otter)
150,000 articles	28 December 2008	Guerra dels Ossos (Bone Wars)
175,000 articles	7 May 2009	Spilocuscus (Spilocuscus)
200,000 articles	21 September 2009	Carnaval de Solsona (Solsona Carnival)
250,000 articles	29 June 2010	Mare de Déu del Claustre (Mare de Déu del Claustre)
300,000 articles	21 December 2010	Pastítsio (Pastitsio)
400,000 articles	12 April 2013	Heli-4 (Helium-4)
450,000 articles	3 February 2015	L'executor (The Executioner (1970 film))
500,000 articles	11 March 2016	Oda Krohg (Oda Krohg)
600,000 articles	8 January 2019	Pura Velarde (Pura Velarde)
700,000 articles	24 April 2022	Hey, Hey, Rise Up! (Hey, Hey, Rise Up!)
800,000 articles	3 August 2026	(2420) Čiurlionis (2420 Čiurlionis)

Evolution of the number of articles

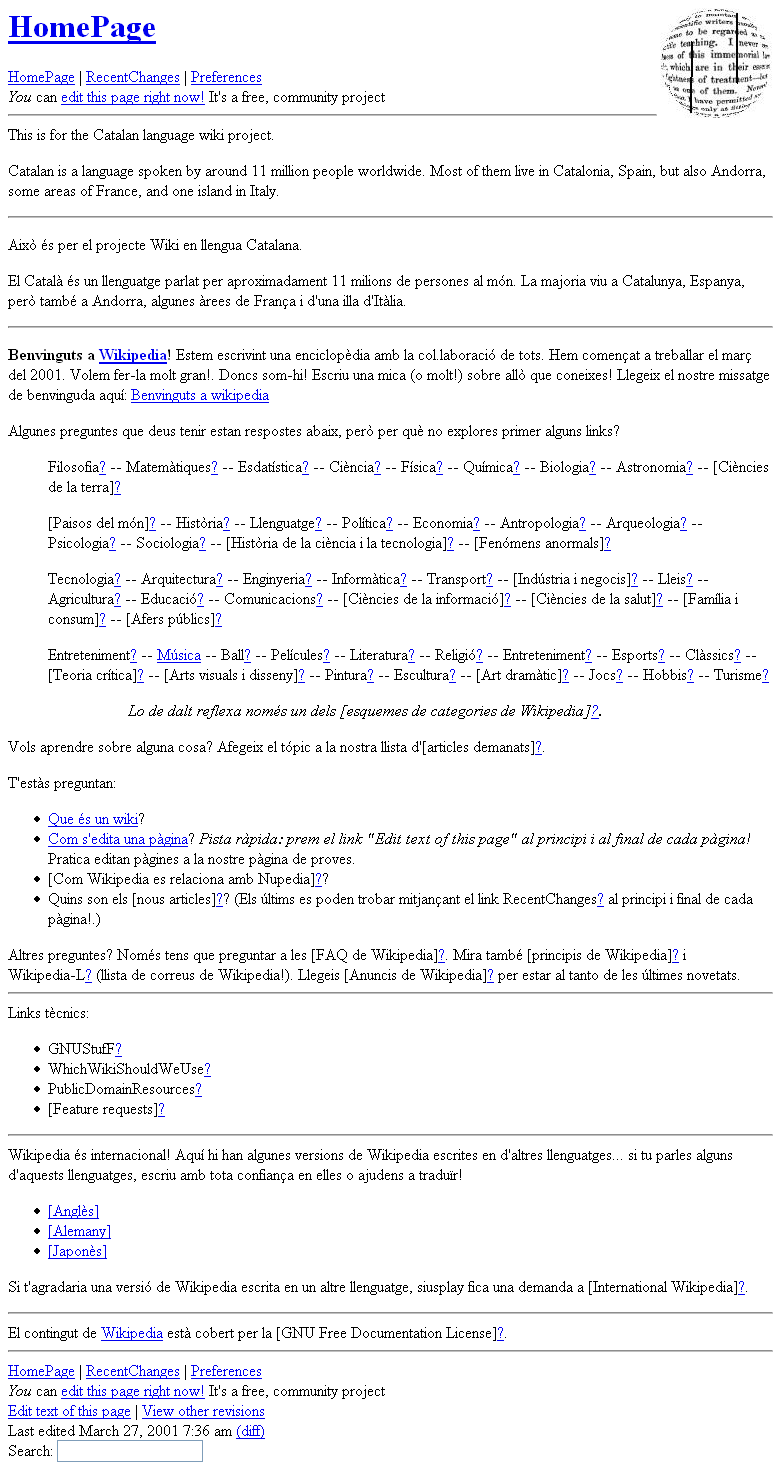
2001 March

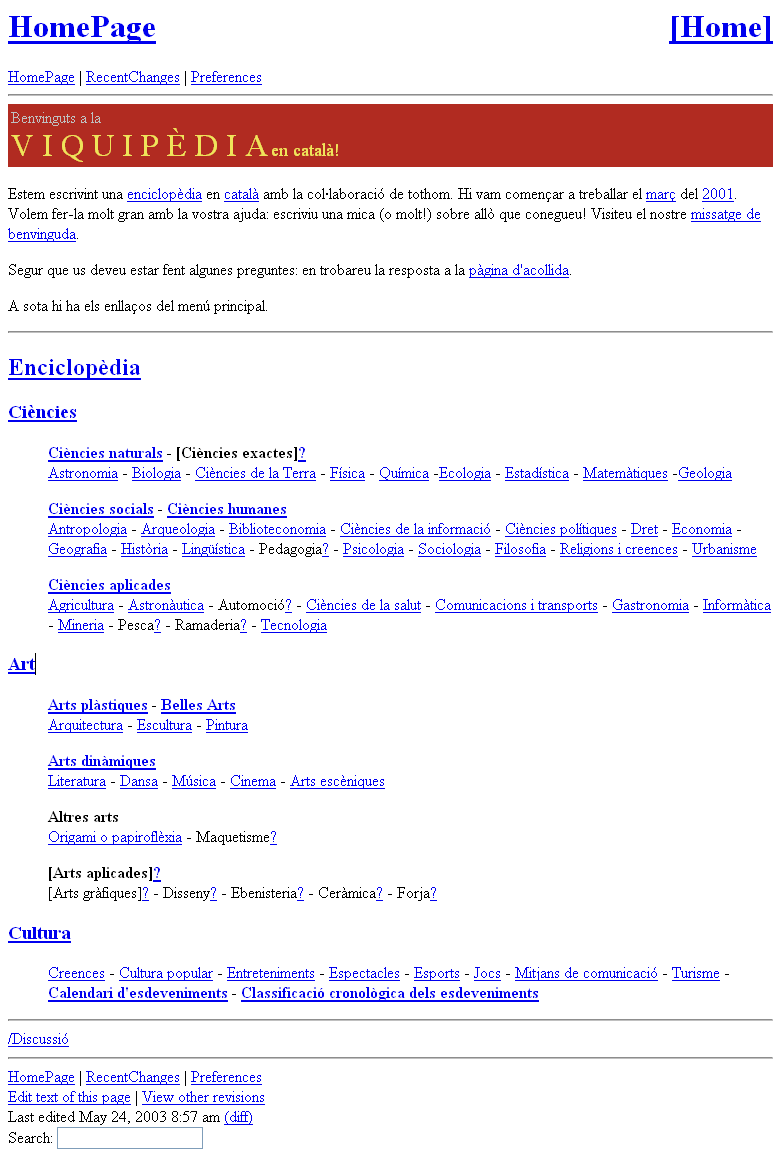
2003 May

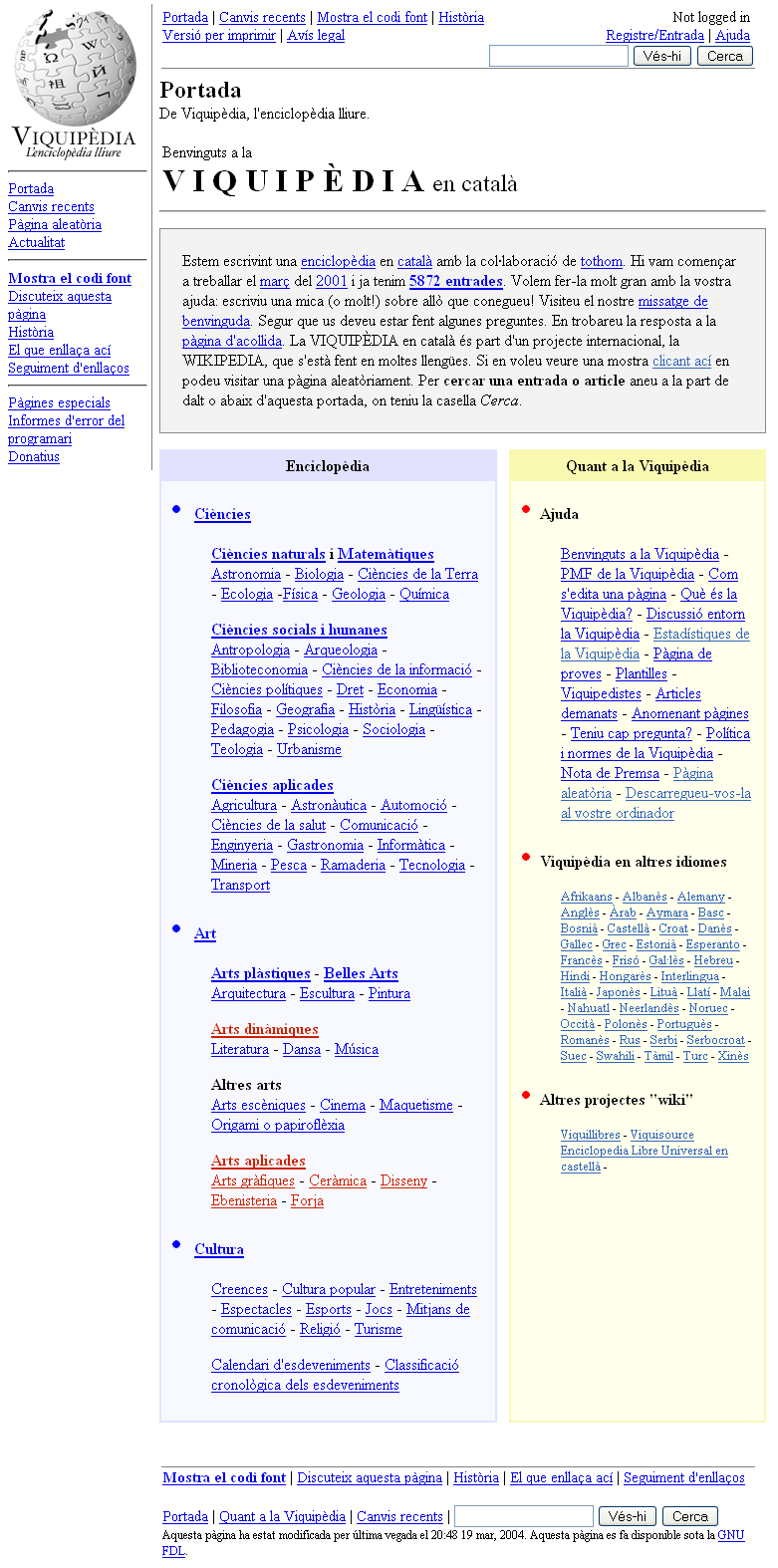
2004 March

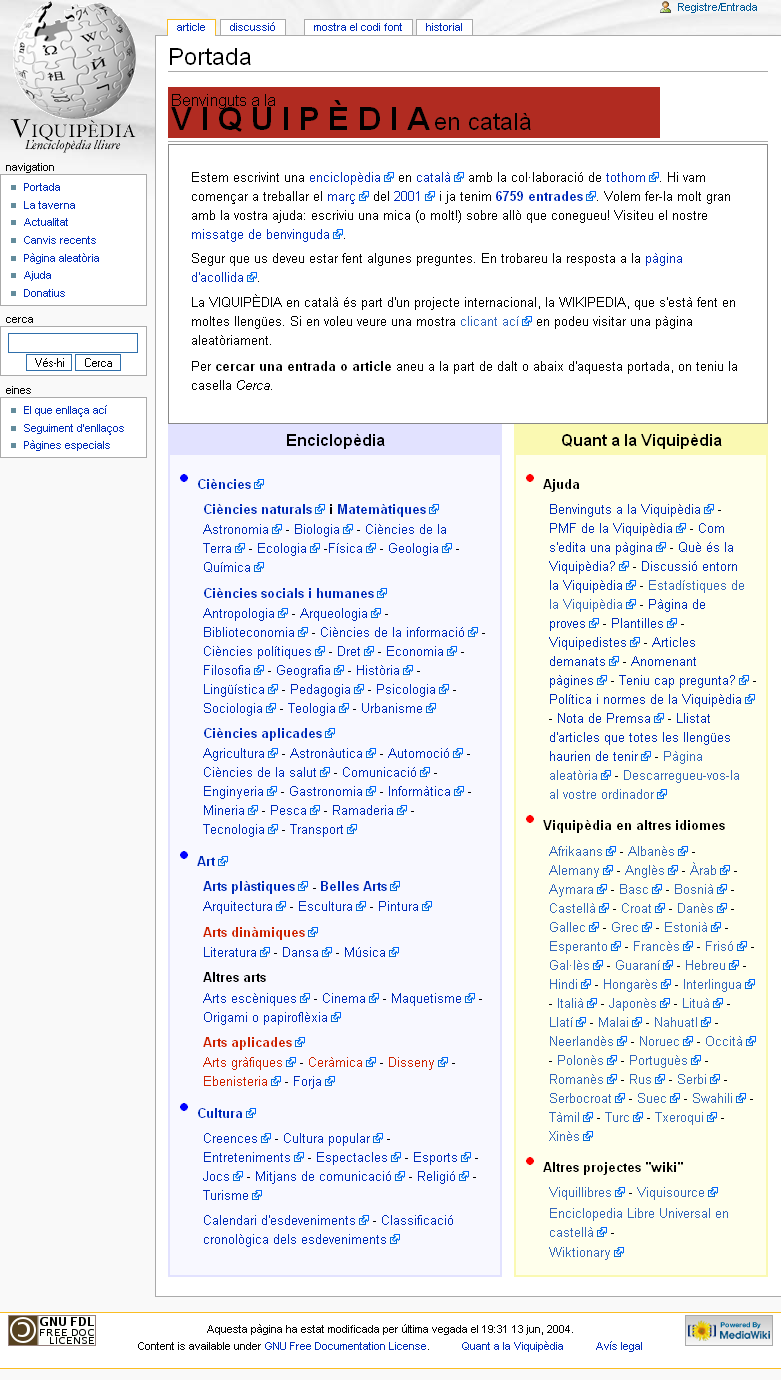
2004 June

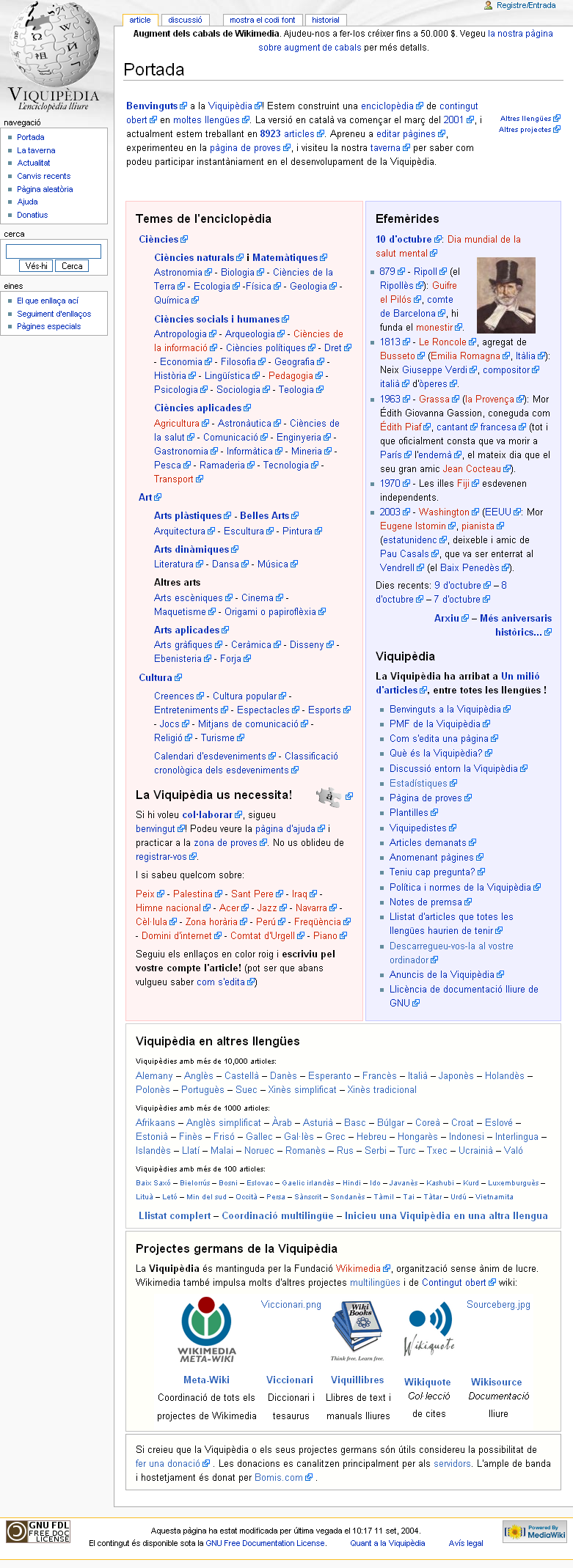
2004 October

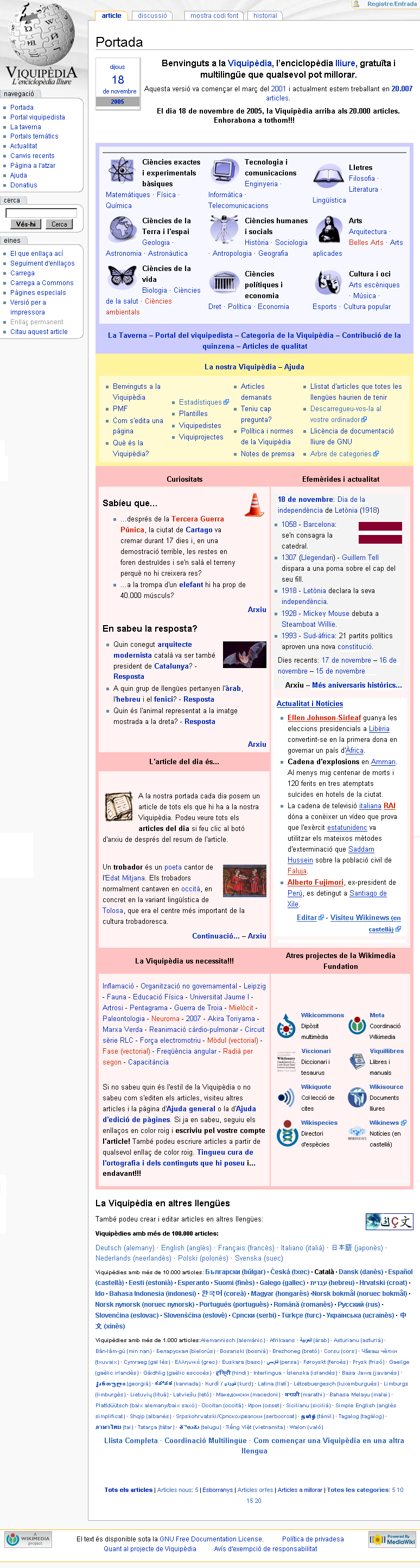
2005 November

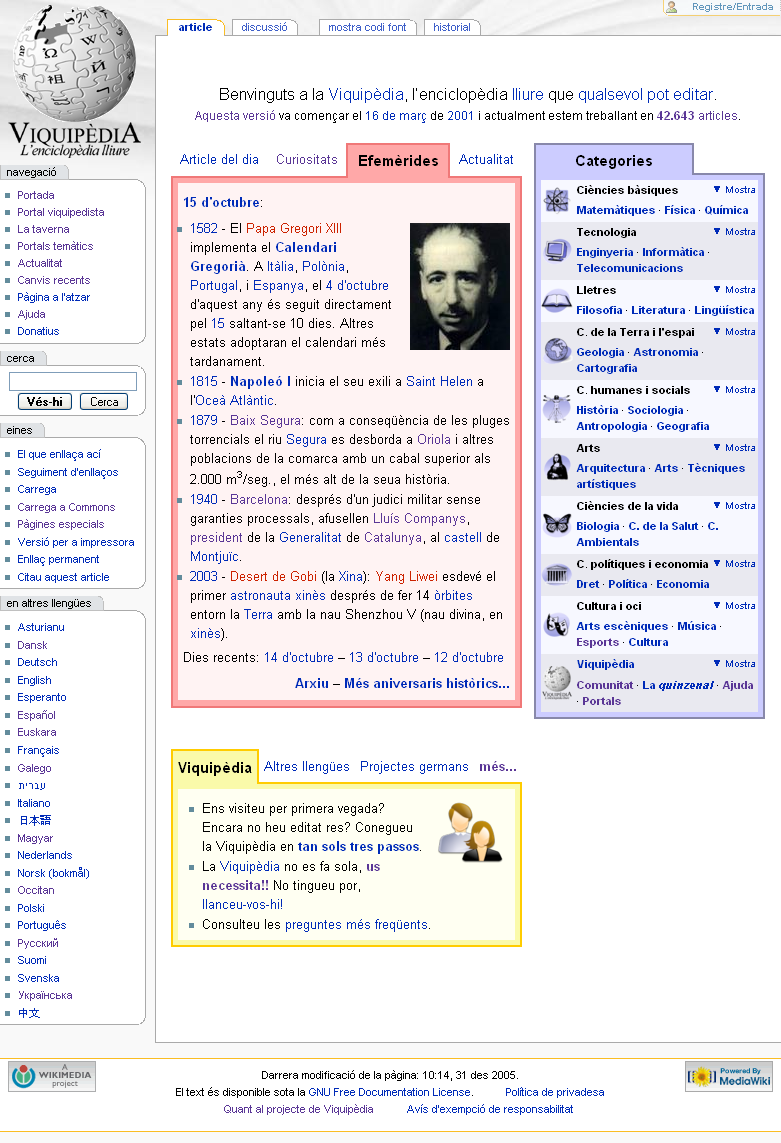
2006 October

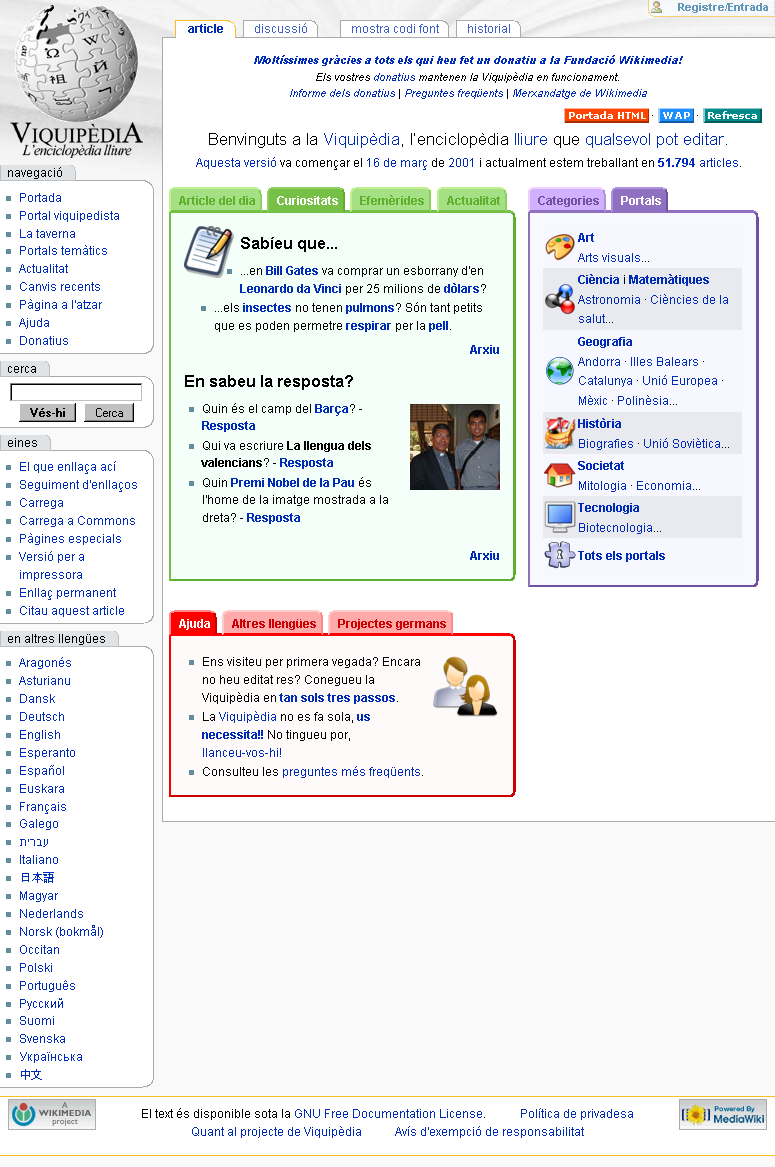
2007 January

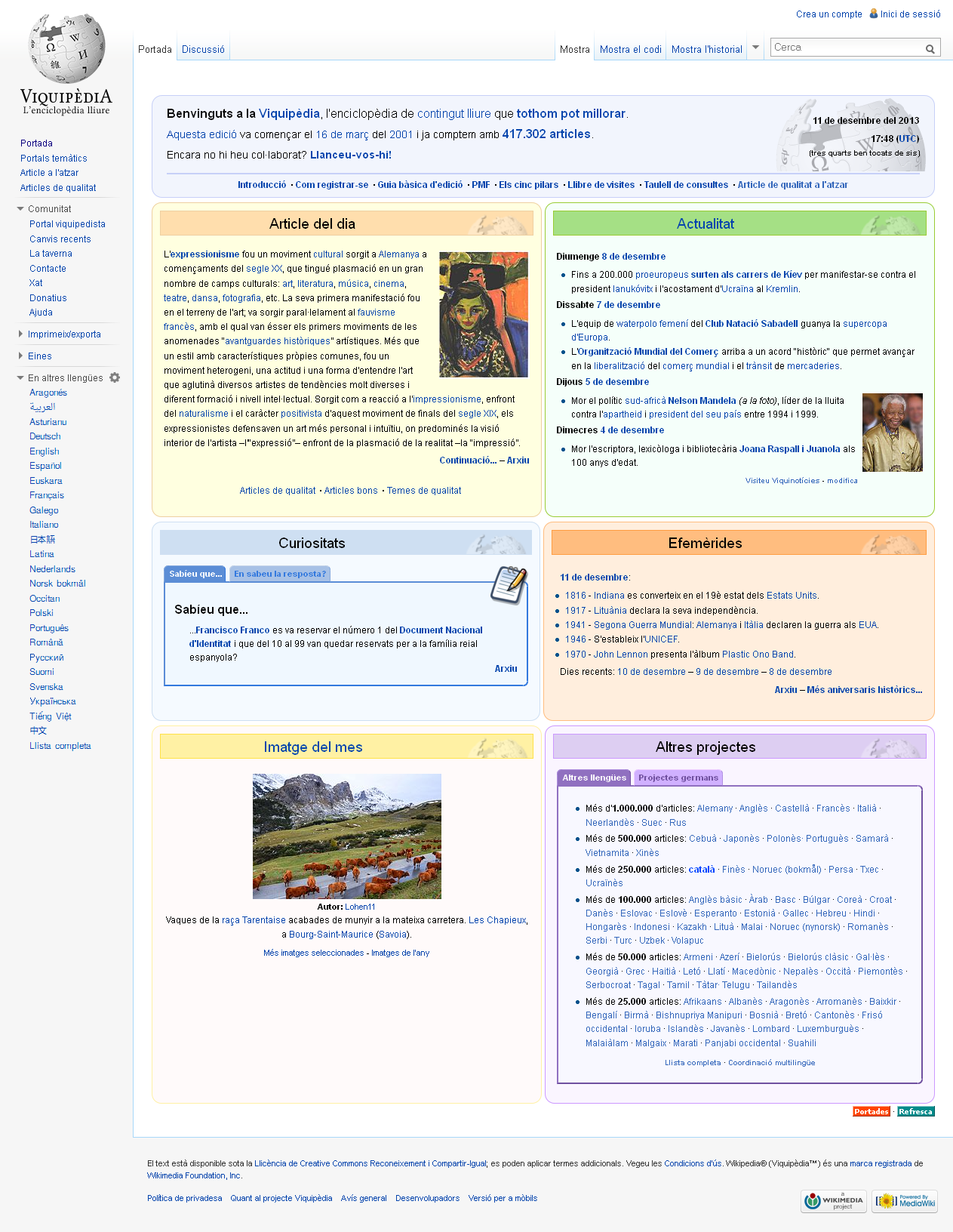
2013 December

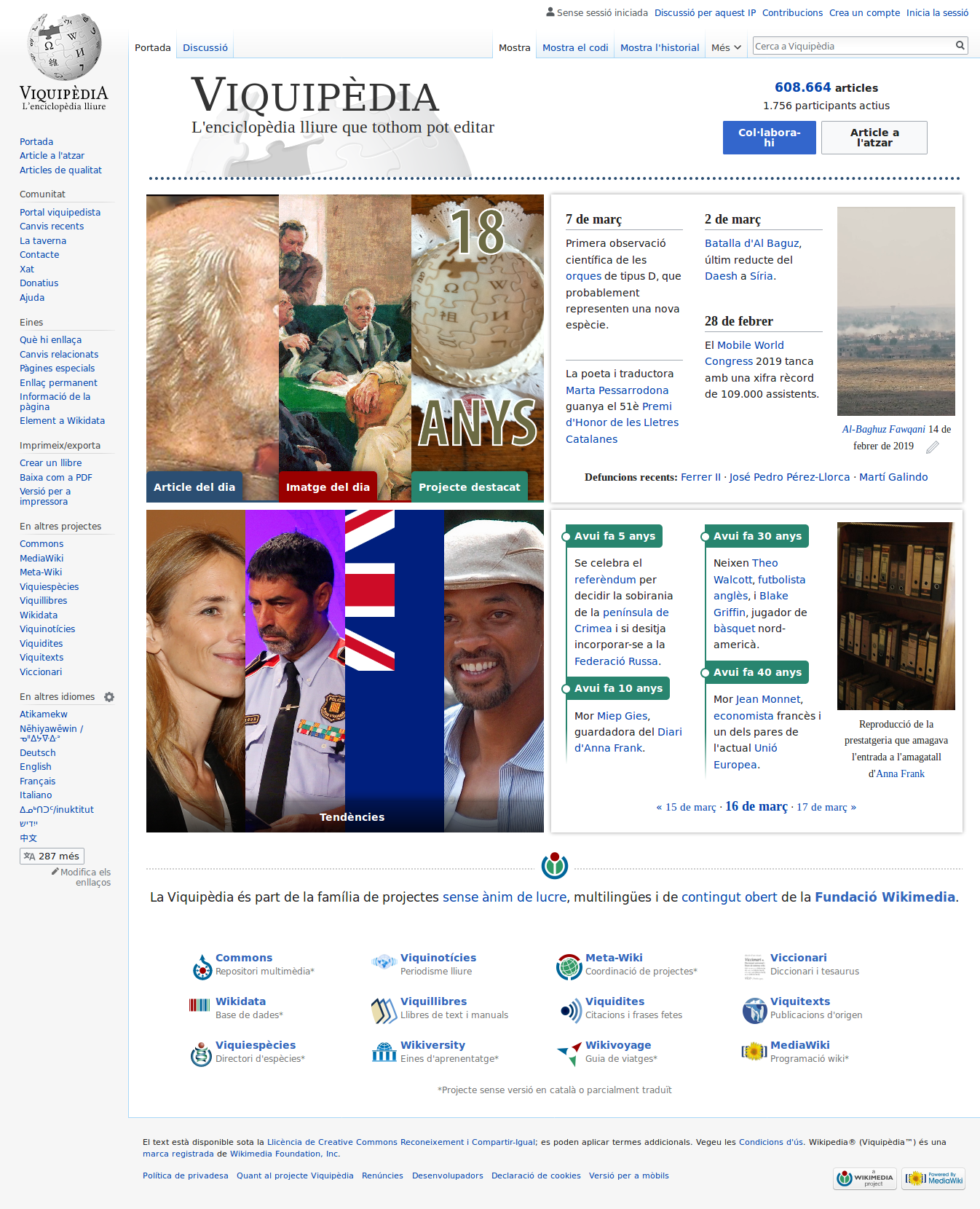
2019 March

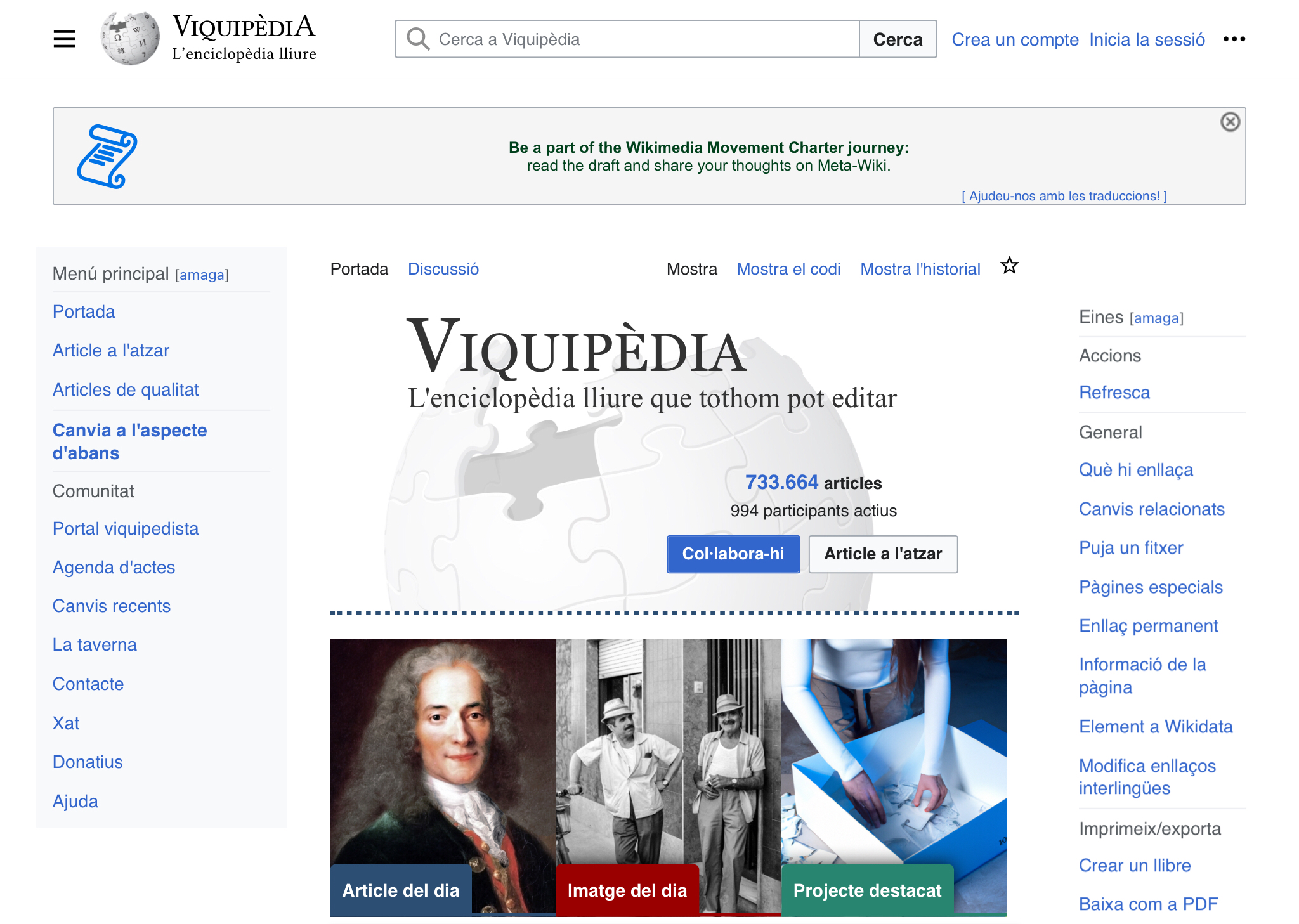
2023 August

== Reception ==
In an academic study published in 2017, seventy-seven university students, most with Catalan and/or Spanish as their native languages, made contributions to the English, Catalan and Spanish Wikipedias as part of assessed work and responded to questionaries. The students preferred the English Wikipedia when looking for general information despite the fact that English was the language they reported being less proficient at: "In many of the open comments on the differences between language editions, the students suggested that the English version was better, more complete or more reliable." Specifically, the participants were asked, "If an article is available in Catalan, Spanish and English, which version are you most likely to read first?" The majority responded that they read articles in English first: "The English version was seen by many of the students as the main reference page, and they stated that they used it 'by default', ... The students responded to this question after having written a Wikipedia article and undergoing the process of publishing it (and thus of the strict peer review curation of the Wikipedia community of volunteers)."

== See also ==
- Spanish Wikipedia
- Occitan Wikipedia
