= Enciclopedia Libre Universal en Español =

Defunct Spanish-language wiki encyclopedia

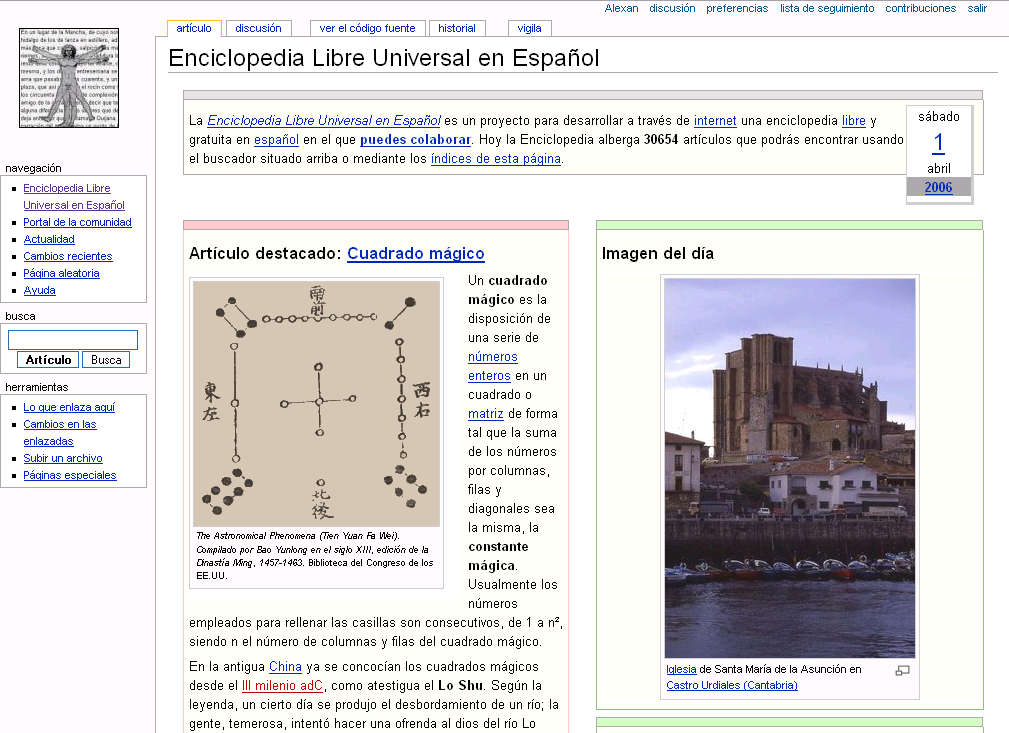
- Screenshot of the main page on 1 April 2006
- Website type: Wiki, online encyclopedia
- Available in: Spanish
- Owner: University of Seville
- Creator: Edgar Enyedy
- Website: enciclopedia.us.es
- Commercial: No
- Registration: Not required (although in some events unregistered users have to register to view and edit)
- Users: 3,921 registered users, 1 active (September 2023)
- Launched: 26 February 2002; 24 years ago
- Current status: Inactive
- Content license: Creative Commons Attribution/Share-Alike 3.0
- Written in: MediaWiki, made in PHP

Enciclopedia Libre Universal en Español (Note: IPA: [enθikloˈpeðja ˈliβɾe uniβeɾˈsal en espaˈɲol]; lit. 'Universal Free Encyclopedia in Spanish') was a Spanish-language wiki-based online encyclopedia that started as a fork of the Spanish Wikipedia, released under the Creative Commons Attribution-ShareAlike License 3.0 and using the same MediaWiki software.

To encourage intellectual freedom, Enciclopedia Libre allowed for a wider range of writing styles and content types. For instance, writers could reflect on philosophical questions, express personal interpretations of cultural issues, or present contrasting viewpoints on controversial subjects.

== History ==
The Enciclopedia Libre was founded by contributors to the Spanish Wikipedia who decided to start an independent project. Led by Edgar Enyedy, they left Wikipedia on 26 February 2002, and created the new website, provided by the University of Seville for free, with the freely licensed articles of the Spanish Wikipedia.

The reasons for the split are explained on Enciclopedia Libre. Key issues included concerns about censorship and the possibility of advertising on Wikipedia. Edgar Enyedy stated the main reasons for splitting at that time as:

- Perceived expectation that Wikipedia would soon start hosting advertisements.
- Non-English Wikipedias were running older versions of MediaWiki.
- When national groups offered help in software development and maintenance, access to the servers was denied.
- The downloadable database dumps of Wikipedia content were highly outdated.
- Wikipedia was hosted on a .com rather than a .org domain.

== Post-split history ==
The project largely failed to catch on, but was successful in convincing Wikipedia to make several changes, such as its migration from wikipedia.com to wikipedia.org. In 2011, Enyedy said that the sole reason for the failure of Enciclopedia Libre Universal en Español as a long-term project was that it "was not intended to last. It was merely a form of pressure. Some of the goals were achieved, not all of them, but it was worth the cost." He further said "Nowadays, the romantic point of view is that EL survived and is still going strong." He argued that while the viewpoint is positive, it is not factual. By late 2024 the site had ceased operations altogether.

== See also ==
- EcuRed – Online encyclopedia from Cuba built on MediaWiki software
- Susning.nu – former Swedish wiki
- Baidu Baike – Chinese wiki
- List of online encyclopedias
