= Occitan Wikipedia =

Occitan-language edition of Wikipedia

- Website type: Internet encyclopedia
- Available in: Occitan
- Owner: Wikimedia Foundation
- Website: oc.wikipedia.org
- Commercial: No
- Registration: Optional
- Content license: Creative Commons Attribution/ Share-Alike 4.0 (most text also dual-licensed under GFDL); Media licensing varies

The Occitan Wikipedia (Occitan: wikipèdia en occitan) is the Occitan language version of Wikipedia. The Occitan Wikipedia has 90,908 articles as of 19 September 2026 (ranked 82nd among the 364 language versions of Wikipedia).

== See also ==
- Catalan Wikipedia
- Franco-Provencal Wikipedia
- Aragonese Wikipedia
- French Wikipedia
