= Spanish Wikipedia =

Spanish-language edition of Wikipedia

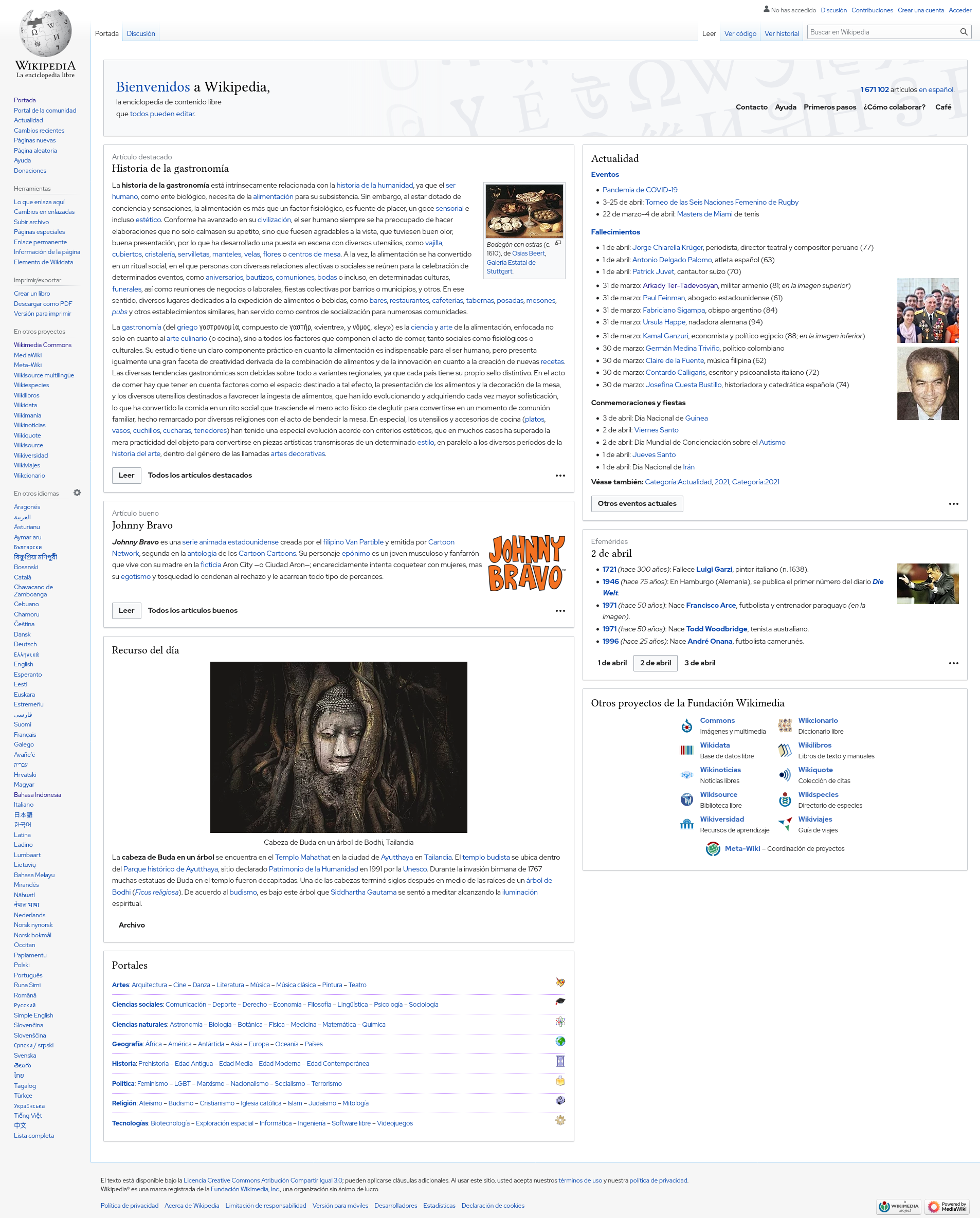
- Screenshot Main Page of the Spanish Wikipedia in April 2021
- Website type: Internet encyclopedia project
- Available in: Spanish
- Owner: Wikimedia Foundation
- Website: es.wikipedia.org
- Commercial: No
- Registration: Optional
- Users: 8.37 million (as of 21 November 2026)
- Launched: 11 May 2001; 25 years ago
- Content license: Creative Commons Attribution/ Share-Alike 4.0 (most text also dual-licensed under GFDL); Media licensing varies

The Spanish Wikipedia (Spanish: Wikipedia en español) is the Spanish-language edition of Wikipedia, a free online encyclopedia. It has 2,151,138 articles. Started in May 2001, it reached 100,000 articles on 8 March 2006, and 1,000,000 articles on 16 May 2013. It is the 7th-largest Wikipedia as measured by the number of articles and has the 4th-most edits. It also ranks 32nd in terms of article depth among Wikipedias.

Spanish Wikipedia has been criticized for being less reliable than the English and German Wikipedias, as well as more prone to disinformation from Russian government outlets. It has also been accused of whitewashing left-wing authoritarian regimes such as that of Cuba's, and for allowing damaging disinformation about living people who are critical of the left (see § Political bias section below). The Spanish edition has one of the lowest retentions of new editors. It has one of the highest edit revert rates and the second lowest ratio of administrators (locally called bibliotecarios, literally "librarians") to active editors (0.38%), behind the Japanese Wikipedia.

== History ==
In February 2002, Larry Sanger wrote an e-mail to a mailing list stating that Bomis was considering selling advertisements on Wikipedia. Edgar Enyedy, a user on the Spanish Wikipedia, objected to the proposal. Jimmy Wales and Sanger responded by saying that they did not immediately plan to implement advertisements, but Enyedy began establishing a fork. Enciclopedia Libre was established by 26 February 2002. Enyedy persuaded most of the Spanish Wikipedians into going to the fork. By the end of 2002, over 10,000 articles were posted on the new site, and the Spanish Wikipedia was inactive for the rest of the year. Andrew Lih wrote that "for a long time it seemed that Spanish Wikipeda [sic] would be the unfortunate runt left from the Spanish fork." The general popularity of Wikipedia attracted new users to the Spanish Wikipedia who were unfamiliar with the fork and these users came by June 2003. By the end of that year the Spanish Wikipedia had over 10,000 articles. The size of the Spanish Wikipedia overtook that of the fork in the last months of 2004.

Lih stated in 2009 that the concepts of advertising and forking were still sensitive issues for the Wikipedia community because "It took more than a year for the Spanish Wikipedia to get back on its feet again" after the fork had been initiated.

After the spin-off, the Spanish Wikipedia had very little activity until the upgrade to the Phase III of the software, later renamed MediaWiki, when the number of new users started to increase again.

Ever since then, the Spanish Wikipedia has been far more active than Enciclopedia Libre was. By late 2024, Enciclopedia Libre had ceased operations.

=== Key dates ===
Historical article counts. The Spanish Wikipedia is shown in red; Enciclopedia Libre is blue.

- 16 March 2001: Jimmy Wales announced the internationalization of Wikipedia.
- 11 May 2001: The Spanish Wikipedia is established along with eight other wikis. Its first domain was spanish.wikipedia.com.
- 21 May 2001: The oldest known article, Anexo:Países (English translation: Countries of the world), is created.
- 26 February 2002: many contributors left to form the Enciclopedia Libre Universal en Español, rejecting perceived censorship and the possibility of advertising on the Bomis-supported Wikipedia.
- 23 October 2002: the domain spanish.wikipedia.com is changed to es.wikipedia.org.
- 30 June 2003: the mailing list for the Spanish Wikipedia is created (Wikies-l).
- 6 October 2003: first bot created on this Wikipedia. Its user name is SpeedyGonzalez.
- 18 July 2004: the Spanish edition switches to UTF-8, allowing any character to be used directly in forms.
- 9 December 2004: it is decided that Wikipedia in Spanish will use free images only.
- 24 August 2006: three checkusers are elected. They can examine IP addresses.
- 11 December 2006: following a vote, the Arbitration Committee, whose local name is Comité de Resolución de Conflictos (CRC) is created.
- 11 June 2007: last local image was erased, so all media are retrieved from Wikimedia Commons.
- 1 September 2007: first local chapter of Wikimedia Foundation is created in a Spanish-speaking country (Argentina).
- 13 December 2008: it was decided to eliminate the stub template from Spanish Wikipedia.
- 25 March 2009: the first oversighters are elected. They can delete edits such that they cannot be seen by regular administrators.
- 15 April 2009: the Arbitration Committee is dissolved after a vote.
- 16 May 2013: the Spanish Wikipedia became the seventh Wikipedia to cross the million article count.
- 20 January 2019: the Spanish Wikipedia reaches the count of 1,500,000 articles.
- 2 January 2025: the Spanish Wikipedia reaches the count of 2,000,000 articles.

== Size and users ==
Active editors by country
Country	percent
Spain	29.7%
Mexico	13.4%
Argentina	11.5%
Colombia	7.4%
Peru	7.3%
Chile	7.0%
Ecuador	1.9%
United States	1.8%
Uruguay	1.8%
Costa Rica	1.3%
Other	17.0%
October 2021; Source: Wikimedia Statistics: Page Edits Per Wikipedia Language - Breakdown

The countries in which the Spanish Wikipedia is the most popular language version of Wikipedia are shown in yellow.

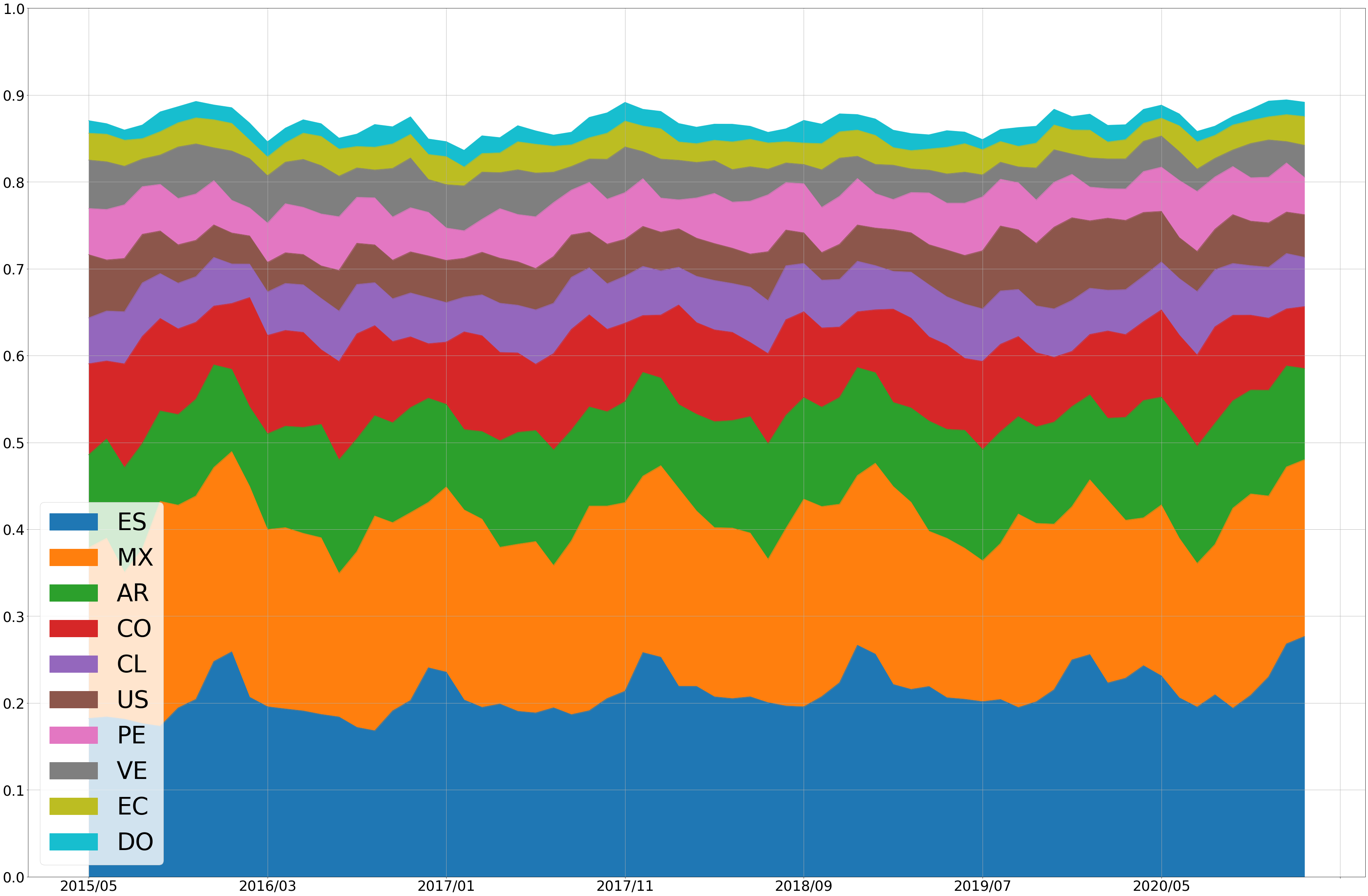
Page views by country of origin on the Spanish Wikipedia

The Spanish Wikipedia has the second most registered users, after the English Wikipedia, and the seventh most active users, after the English, French, German, Japanese, Italian and Chinese Wikipedias. It ranks among the worse Wikipedias in retention of new editors and has one of the highest edit revert rates. The Spanish Wikipedia has the second lowest number of administrators per active editors (0.13%), behind the Japanese edition.

It is ranked seventh for number of articles, below other Wikipedias devoted to languages with smaller numbers of speakers, such as German, French, Cebuano, and Dutch. In 2009, the percentage of articles whose size was above 2 KB was 40%, placing the Spanish Wikipedia as the second out of the ten largest Wikipedias after the German one. As of October 2012, the Spanish Wikipedia was the fourth Wikipedia in terms of the number of edits. As of December 2024, it is the sixth Wikipedia by the number of page views, behind the English, Japanese, Russian, German and French Wikipedias.

By country of origin, by September 2017, Spain was the main contributor to the Spanish Wikipedia (39.2% of edits). It was followed by Argentina (10.7%), Chile (8.8%), the Netherlands (8.4%), Mexico (7.0%), Venezuela (5.1%), Peru (3.5%), the United States (3.1%), Colombia (2.7%), Uruguay (1.3%) and Germany (1.1%). Note that a number of bots are hosted in the Netherlands.

Among the countries where Spanish is either an official language or a de facto national language, Argentina, Chile, Mexico, Spain and Venezuela have established local chapters of the Wikimedia Foundation.

=== Usage in Spain ===
Following a 2007 study by Netsuus on the use of Wikipedia in Spain, it was revealed that most users consult Spanish Wikipedia (97%) compared to Wikipedias in other regional languages (2.17% for Wikipedia in Catalan, 0.64% in Galician and 0.26% in Basque). That is, native speakers of Spanish tend to use Spanish Wikipedia as their go-to source as opposed to those of other languages.

== Differences from other Wikipedias ==
- In contrast with other Wikipedia versions, the Spanish Wikipedia doesn't allow media which is non-free under Wikipedia policy. Spanish Wikipedia has rejected fair use since 2004, after a public vote, and in 2006, it was decided to phase out the use of local image uploads and to exclusively use Wikimedia Commons for images and other media in the future. The last local file was deleted in 2007, and therefore files that cannot be uploaded to Commons (for example, files that are non-free in either the United States, the country of origin, or both) cannot be used on Spanish Wikipedia.
- Unlike the French and English Wikipedias, the Spanish Wikipedia does not have an Arbitration Committee. A local version was created in January 2007 (comprising seven members, chosen by public vote), and dissolved in 2009 after another vote.
- Some templates, like the navigation templates, have been deprecated, being the only Wikipedia where it is forbidden to use these templates, instead relying on categories that perform the same function.
- Terminology in Spanish:
  - The equivalent to the English Wikipedia's featured articles and good articles are artículos destacados and artículos buenos, respectively.
  - Following a vote in August 2004, administrators on the Spanish Wikipedia took the name of bibliotecarios (librarians). Other discarded options were usuarios especiales (special users) or basureros (janitors).
- The majority of edits done by unregistered users are reverted by bots targeting edits that are considered vandalism. Due to this, there were proposals and community votes to let the Spanish Wikipedia disable edits from unregistered users similarly to the Portuguese Wikipedia, but these have not been officially implemented.

== Evaluation and criticism ==
=== Academic studies ===
A comparative study by the Colegio Libre de Eméritos, made by Manuel Arias Maldonado (University of Málaga) and published in 2010, compared some articles with those of the English and German Wikipedias. It concluded that the Spanish version of Wikipedia was the least reliable of the three. It found it to be more cumbersome and imprecise than the German and English Wikipedias, stated that it often lacked reliable sources, including much unreferenced data, and found it to be too dependent on online references.

According to a 2013 Oxford University study, five of the ten most disputed pages on the Spanish Wikipedia were football (soccer) clubs, including Club América, FC Barcelona, Athletic Bilbao, Alianza Lima, and Newell's Old Boys.

According to a 2015 study the Spanish Wikipedia shows the lowest level of structural gender bias among six major Wikipedia language editions analyzed (English, Spanish, German, French, Italian, and Russian).

In a study published in 2017, seventy-seven university students, most with Catalan and/or Spanish as their native languages, made contributions to the English, Spanish and Catalan Wikipedias as part of assessed work and responded to questionaries. The students preferred the English Wikipedia when looking for general information despite the fact that English was the language they reported being less proficient at: "In many of the open comments on the differences between language editions, the students suggested that the English version was better, more complete or more reliable." Specifically, the participants were asked the following question: "If an article is available in Catalan, Spanish and English, which version are you most likely to read first?" The majority responded that they read articles in English first. The researchers wrote that "the English version was seen by many of the students as the main reference page, and they stated that they used it 'by default'", and highlighted that "the students responded to this question after having written a Wikipedia article and undergoing the process of publishing it (and thus of the strict peer review curation of the Wikipedia community of volunteers)."

=== Rebelión.org ===
During Wikimania 2009, free-software activist Richard Stallman criticized the Spanish Wikipedia for restricting links to the Rebelión.org left-wing web site and allegedly banning users who had complained about what had happened. Participants on the Spanish Wikipedia responded that Rebelión.org is primarily a news aggregator, that links to aggregators should be replaced with links to original publishers whenever possible, and that they considered the issue to be one of spam.

=== Pro-Russian disinformation ===
In April 2022, the European Union's East StratCom Task Force found that four pro-Russian disinformation news outlets (SouthFront, NewsFront, InfoRos and Strategic Culture Foundation) were referenced in 52 articles of the Spanish Wikipedia. This made it the third most affected Wikipedia edition by such disinformation, behind the Russian and Arabic Wikipedias. They wrote:

On the English version of Wikipedia, there seems to be a consensus that state-sponsored disinformation sites aren't legitimate sources [...]. One can only guess whether other language versions will follow suit, but there is nothing stopping anyone from launching that debate, pointing out the English Wikipedia example as a best practice.

=== Political bias ===
The Spanish Wikipedia has been criticized for offering a whitewashed coverage of left-wing politician Cristina Kirchner while presenting a negative portrayal of her center-right opponent Mauricio Macri. A May 2020 article in La Nación emphasized that, even though Argentine newspaper Clarín had published an article six months prior (November 2019) highlighting these political biases and their objectionable nature, the Spanish Wikipedia had not corrected the reported problems, despite stating that incorrect information "is quickly corrected".

In March 2021, Argentine historian Luis Alberto Romero [es] criticized the Wikimedia Argentina chapter in Clarín. He stated that hundreds of articles on the history of Argentina were manipulated "with the classic taste of the K narrative" in the Spanish Wikipedia. He blamed those on the top of the Spanish Wikipedia hierarchy, who can "accept or reject the collaborations" and who "since 2009 are crowded by a group of Kirschnerist militants".

In June 2022, Venezuelan newspaper El Nacional observed that the Spanish Wikipedia describes the United Socialist Party of Venezuela as "a political party with socialist, anticapitalist, antiimperialist and internationalist ideology, which takes as its principles Simon Bolivar's work, scientific socialism, Christianism and liberation theology." The newspaper also noted that the Spanish Wikipedia article omitted that the party's goal has been to turn into the only existing political organization in Venezuela.

In July 2022, Infobae writer Claudia Peiró criticized the Spanish Wikipedia for using euphemisms to describe Cuba's political system to avoid a clear characterization as a dictatorship. Peiró also ridiculed the Spanish Wikipedia for claiming that Cuba is "similar to other states with parliamentary forms of government" and that its National Assembly "consists of representatives that are elected by universal, free, direct and secret vote" by Cubans every five years.

In September 2022, a manifesto signed by Juan Carlos Girauta, Álvaro Vargas Llosa, Cayetana Álvarez de Toledo, Joaquín Leguina, Albert Rivera, Daniel Lacalle, Lucía Etxebarría, Félix de Azúa, Francisco Sosa Wagner, Cristina Ayala, Miriam Tey and Toni Cantó among others was published denouncing political bias on the Spanish Wikipedia. They also denounced that the Spanish Wikipedia refuses to correct false claims that are damaging to living persons, especially those critical of the left.

Conversely, in the view of Florencia Claes, the president of Spain's Wikimedia chapter, "the Spanish Wikipedia is markedly right-wing".

For a significant part of Catalan public opinion, the Spanish-language Wikipedia is a bastion of Francoist ideology.

== Notes ==
- Lih, Andrew (2009). The Wikipedia Revolution. New York City: Hyperion. First Edition. ISBN 978-1-4013-0371-6.
