= Euthydemus =

Euthydemus (Ancient Greek: Εὐθύδημος) may refer to:

== People ==
- Euthydemus, a fleet commander for Athens during the Sicilian Expedition, 415 to 413 BC
- Euthydemus of Chios, a 5th-century BC sophist who features in Plato's dialogue Euthydemus
- Euthydemus, a son of Cephalus, mentioned in Plato's Republic
- Euthydemus, a son of Diocles, mentioned in Xenophon's Memorabilia
- Euthydemus I, 3rd century BC ruler of the Greco-Bactrian Kingdom
- Euthydemus II, 2nd century BC ruler of the Greco-Bactrian Kingdom
- Euthydemus (tyrant), 3rd century BC tyrant of Sicyon

== Dialogues ==
- Euthydemus (dialogue), a dialogue by Plato
