= EcuRed =

Online Cuban encyclopedia

- Screenshot
- Website type: Online encyclopedia
- Available in: Spanish
- Creator: Shared authorship
- Website: www.ecured.cu
- Commercial: No
- Registration: Optional (required to edit pages)
- Launched: August 2009 (Test phase); 13 December 2010 (Official launch)
- Current status: Active
- Content license: CC BY-NC-SA
- Written in: MediaWiki

EcuRed is a Cuban online encyclopedia built on MediaWiki software. The site was launched on 13 December 2010. The name is an acronym from the Spanish phrase Enciclopedia Cubana en la Red (literally "Cuban Encyclopedia on the Web").

== Content ==
EcuRed was launched by the Cuban government, is based in Wikipedia and its content is closely entwined with the Cuban Revolution. The project is written from a perspective supportive of the Revolution. For example, EcuRed says of Fidel Castro "Today he writes and participates in the struggle of ideas worldwide. Due to his moral authority, he influences important and strategic decisions of the revolution", says that George W. Bush "continues a long family tradition of dirty business, cheating and government intrigue", and describes the United States as "the empire of our time" and "the most powerful nation of all time."

EcuRed states on its webpage that its goal "is the accumulation and development of knowledge with a non-profit, pro-democracy aim from a decolonizing point of view".

== Reception ==
EcuRed was described by The Guardian as a Cuban version of Wikipedia. Activist Oswaldo Payá Sardiñas, winner of the Sakharov Prize for Freedom of Thought, accused the encyclopedia of "molding reality" and said it was "a perversion to destroy the mind". The encyclopedia refers to the United States as "the empire of our time" and "the most powerful nation of all time", which has historically taken "by force territory and natural resources from other nations, to put at the service of its businesses and monopolies". The encyclopedia describes blogger Yoani Sánchez as a "cybermercenary linked to the United States government".

== See also ==
- Enciclopedia Libre Universal en Español – Defunct Spanish-language wiki encyclopedia
