= Samogitian Wikipedia =

Samogitian-language edition of Wikipedia

- Website type: Internet encyclopedia project
- Available in: Samogitian
- Owner: Wikimedia Foundation
- Creator: Zords Davini (Arnas Udovičius)
- Website: bat-smg.wikipedia.org
- Commercial: No
- Registration: Optional
- Content license: Creative Commons Attribution/ Share-Alike 4.0 (most text also dual-licensed under GFDL); Media licensing varies

Samogitian Wikipedia (Samogitian: Žemaitėška Vikipedėjė) is a section of Wikipedia in the Samogitian language. This section of Wikipedia was founded in 2006 by Zords Davini (Arnas Udovičius). Now (20 November 2026) it has 17,276 articles.

== History ==
Number of article milestones:

- 2006, 25 March — 1 (start)
- 2007, 9 February — 1,000
- 2008, 24 January — 5,000
- 2009, 14 April — 10,000
- 2016, 23 February — 15,000
- 2017, 29 January — 16,000
- 2022, 17 June — 17,077
- 2026, 20 November (now) — 17,275
