= Basque Wikipedia =

Basque-language edition of Wikipedia

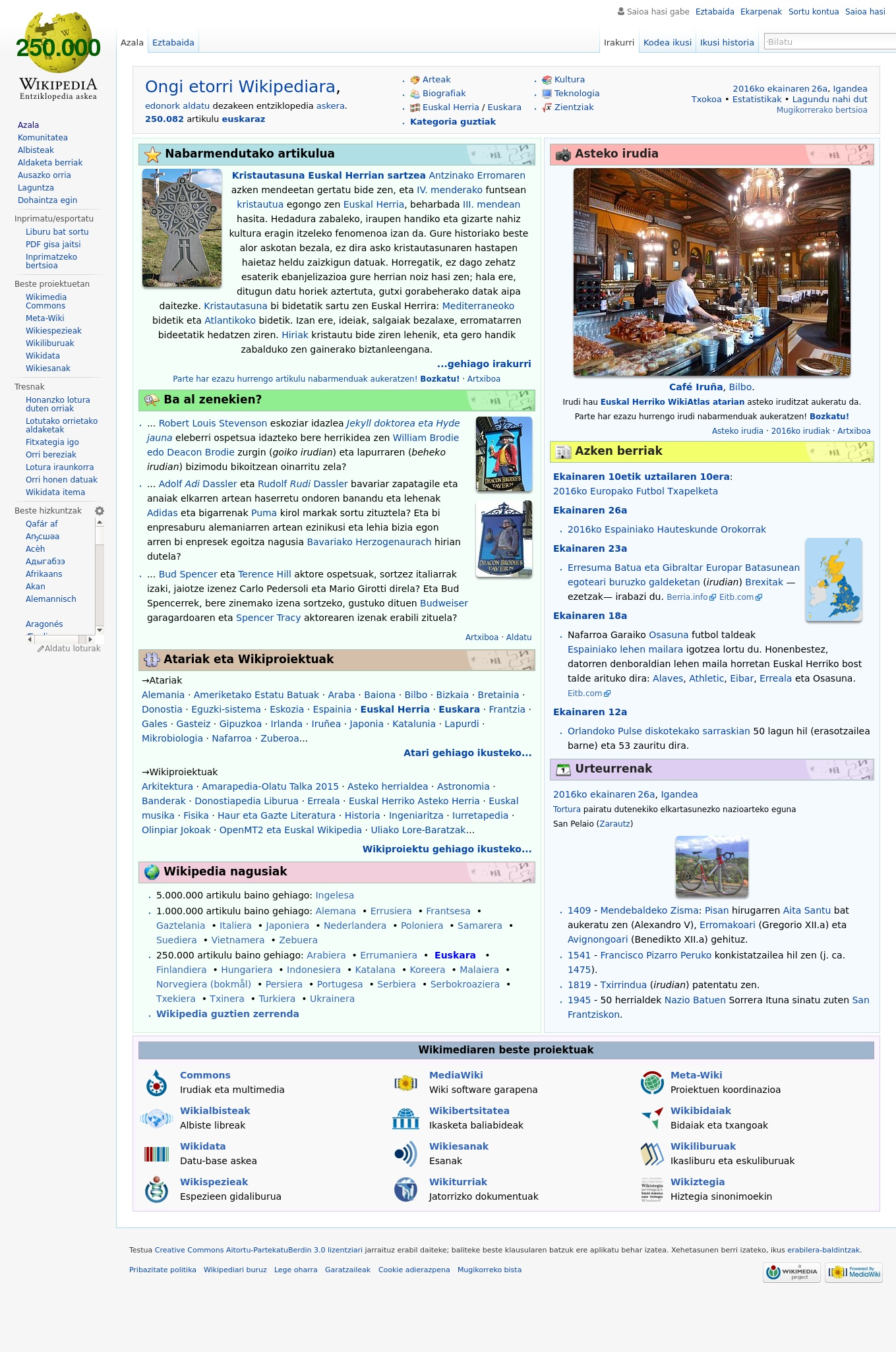
- Basque Wikipedia's screenshot, 26 June 2016. It currently has 500,194 articles.
- Website type: Internet encyclopedia project
- Available in: Basque
- Owner: Wikimedia Foundation
- Website: eu.wikipedia.org
- Commercial: No
- Registration: Optional
- Launched: 6 December 2001; 24 years ago
- Content license: Creative Commons Attribution/ Share-Alike 4.0 (most text also dual-licensed under GFDL); Media licensing varies

The Basque Wikipedia (Basque: Euskarazko Wikipedia or Euskal Wikipedia) is the Basque language edition of Wikipedia. Founded on 6 December 2001, although its main page was created in November 2003, it reached 58,124 articles by 19 August 2010, making it the 45th-largest Wikipedia. As of November 2026, it has 911 active contributors, of which 12 are administrators, and has about 500,000 articles.

== History ==
In an August 2007 interview, Jimmy Wales, co-founder of Wikipedia, used the Basque Wikipedia as an example of the rationale for having Wikipedias in smaller languages:

"Certainly within Wikipedia right now we are seeing some fairly successful projects in small European languages. You don't really need a Welsh language Wikipedia, perhaps. The number of people who speak Welsh who don't also speak English is very small and getting smaller every year. So why do we have a Welsh Wikipedia? Well, people wanted it, so they're making it. And language preservation is the main motive. It is their mother tongue and they want to keep it alive, keep its literature alive. Certainly some of the larger small languages like Basque and Catalan have very successful projects. I definitely see that preserving parts of your language and culture through collaborative projects makes a lot of sense."

On 25 January 2008, the Basque Wikipedia was awarded the Argia Saria granted by the magazine Argia in the category of Internet.

On 21 May 2011, Basque Wikipedia published its 100,000 article, an article about the prohibition of using Basque language throughout history called Euskararen debekua. In December 2011, around 11,000 new articles were added to Basque Wikipedia by the Culture Ministry of the Basque Government.

in December 2025, they were the first to upload all the articles in the list of 1,000 articles that all Wikipedians must have, in excess of 30,000 bytes.

=== Txikipedia ===
In 2018, the Basque Wikipedia started a sub-project where articles were aimed at children, named Txikipedia ("txiki" being Basque for "small"). It was inspired by an independent French project named Vikidia. Two years after the launch, the project had 2,600 articles, most being focused on maths and natural sciences.

== Statistics ==
As of September 2024, the Basque Wikipedia has the fourth greatest number of articles per speaker among Wikipedias with over 100,000 articles, and ranks 21st overall. These figures were based on Ethnologue's estimate of 665,800 Basque speakers.

Number of Articles	Date	Article
1	6 December 2001	Lurra
1,000	April 2004	
5,000	28 January 2006	
10,000	28 May 2006	
20,000	10 September 2007	
25,000	6 April 2008	Euskal Herriak Bere Eskola
30,000	12 September 2008	Sexu
40,000	15 July 2009	Eden Project
45,000	13 October 2009	Xinmin Hiria
50,000	30 December 2009	Errinozero
55,000	12 April 2010	
60,000	8 November 2010	Posta Kode
70,000	18 April 2011	Écurat
80,000	22 April 2011	Kolonbiako geografia
90,000	1 May 2011	Elisabet Farnesio
100,000	21 May 2011	Euskararen debekua
120,000	21 December 2011	
130,000	5 May 2012	Vireo approximans
150,000	27 March 2013	Pointe-à-Pitre
200,000	19 September 2014	Malda (topografia)
250.000	23 June 2016	Abuwtiyuw
400.000	19 October 2022	Justizia klimatiko
500.000	5 November 2026	Arkupea (Gasteiz)

=== New articles per day ===
- 8 November 2010: 456 articles
- 20 December 2009: 239 articles
- 8 October 2009: 219 articles
- 30 August 2009: 141 articles
- 7 October 2009: 134 articles
- 11 October 2009: 125 articles
- 9 October 2009: 118 articles
- 13 October 2009: 115 articles

== Gallery ==
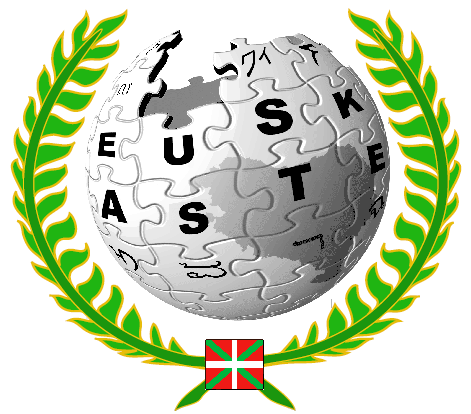
Basque Week logo (during October).

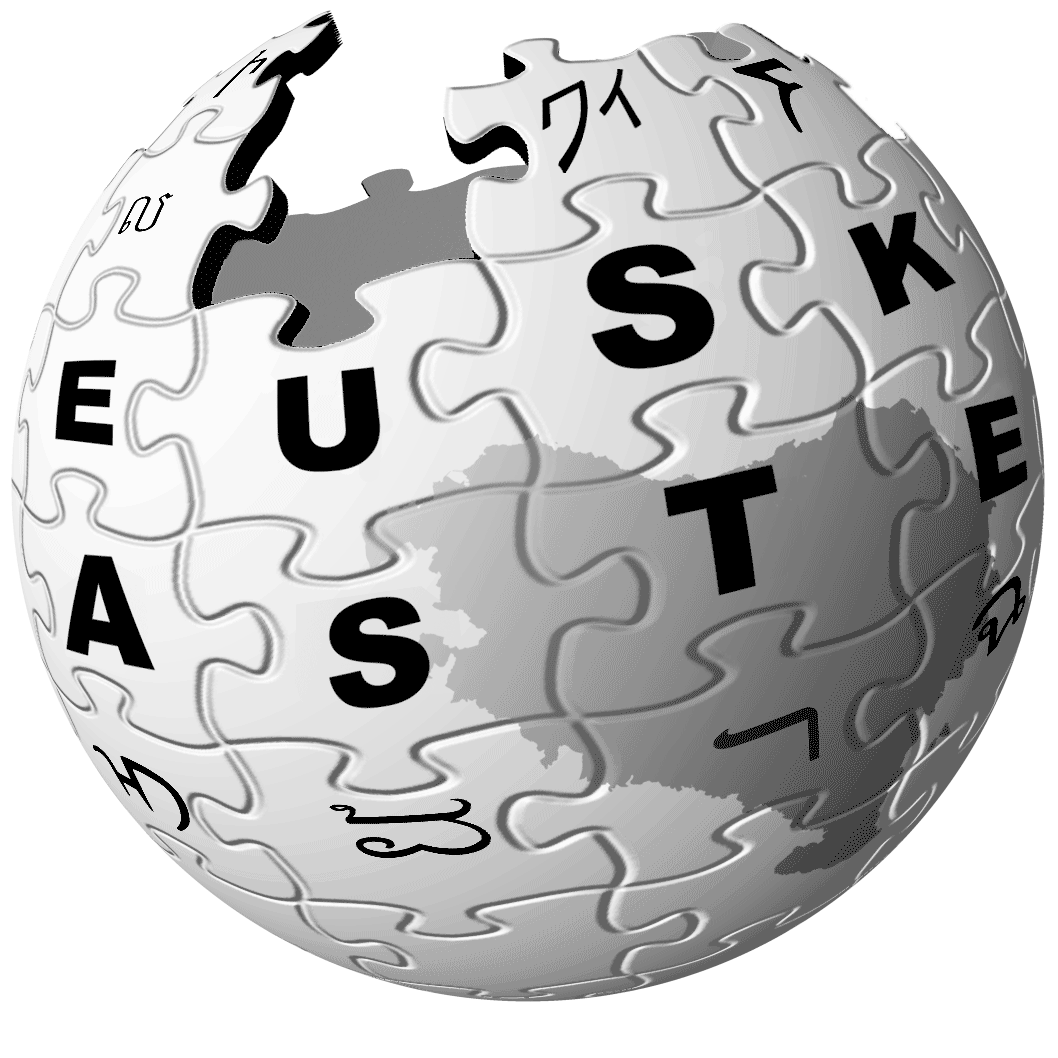
2009 Basque Week logo (during October).

Basque Wikipedia's 25.000 article logo

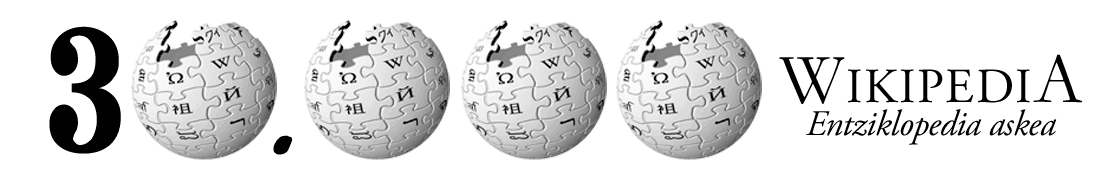
Basque Wikipedia's 30.000 article logo

Basque Wikipedia's 40.000 article logo

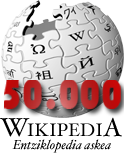
Basque Wikipedia's 50.000 article logo

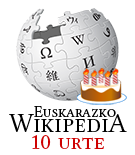
2011 - Basque Wikipedia's tenth birthday's logo

Txikipedia logo

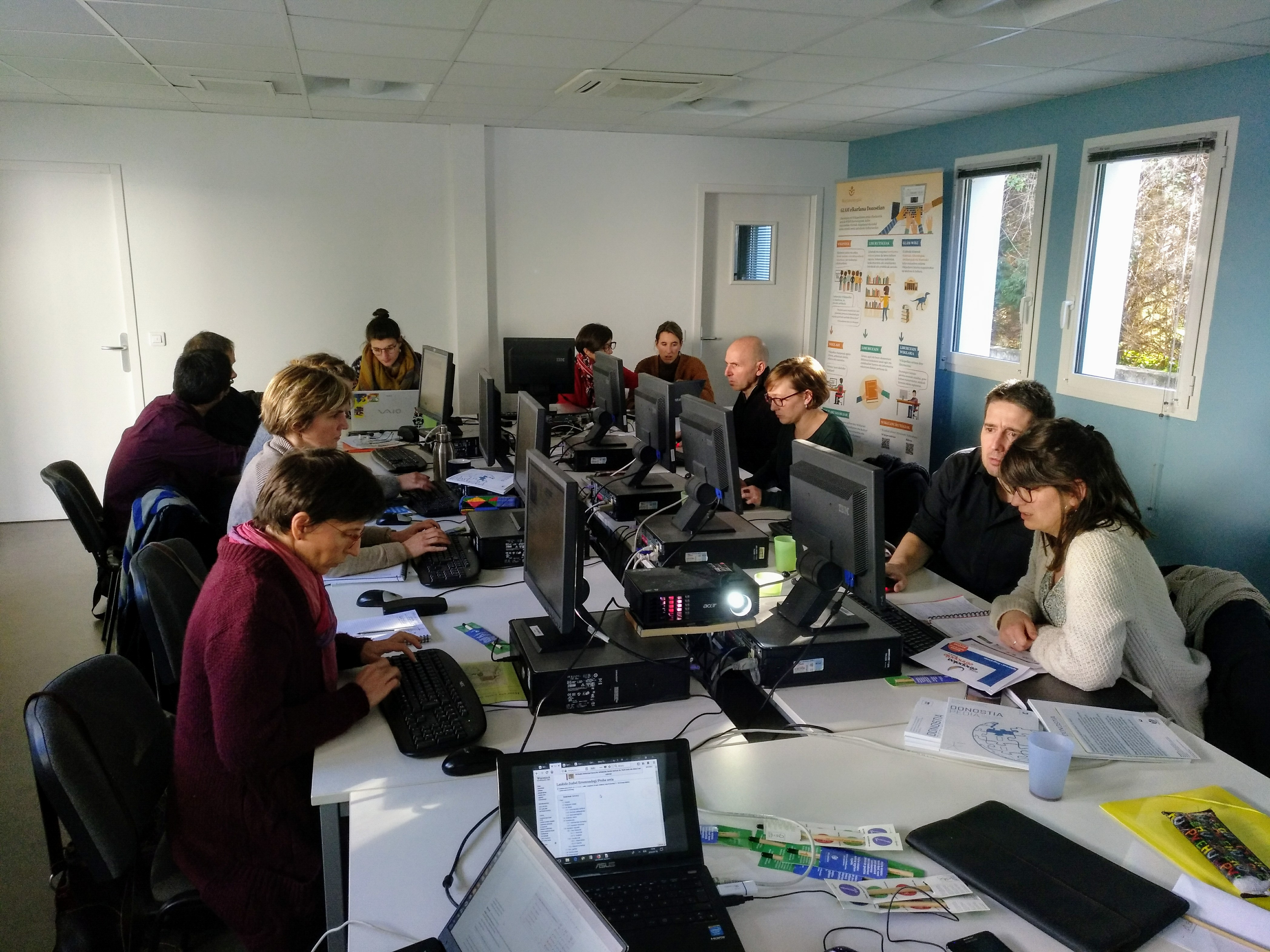
Workshop held by Basque Wikimedians with librarians in Bayonne

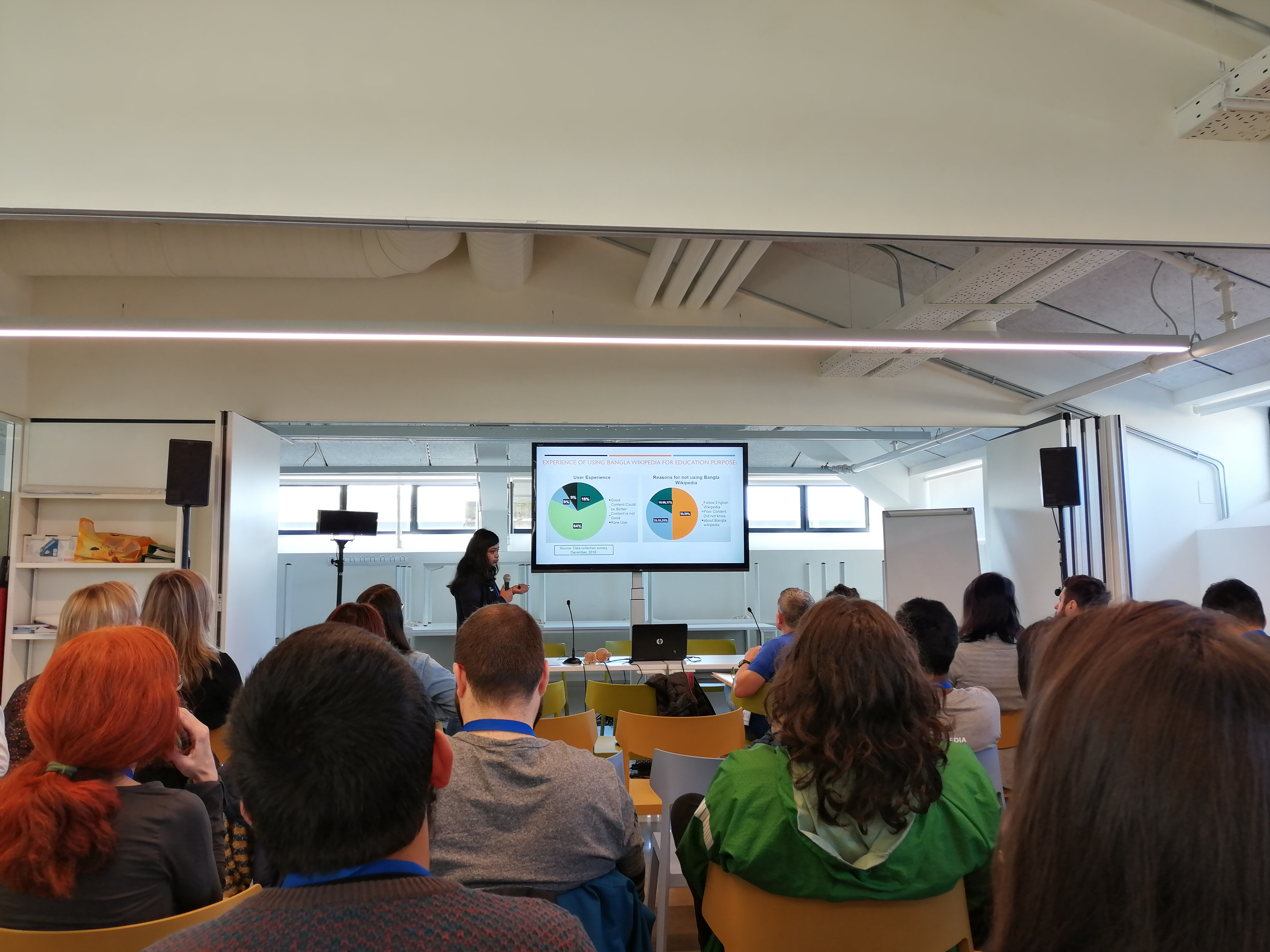
Wikimedia Education Conference, San Sebastian. 2019.

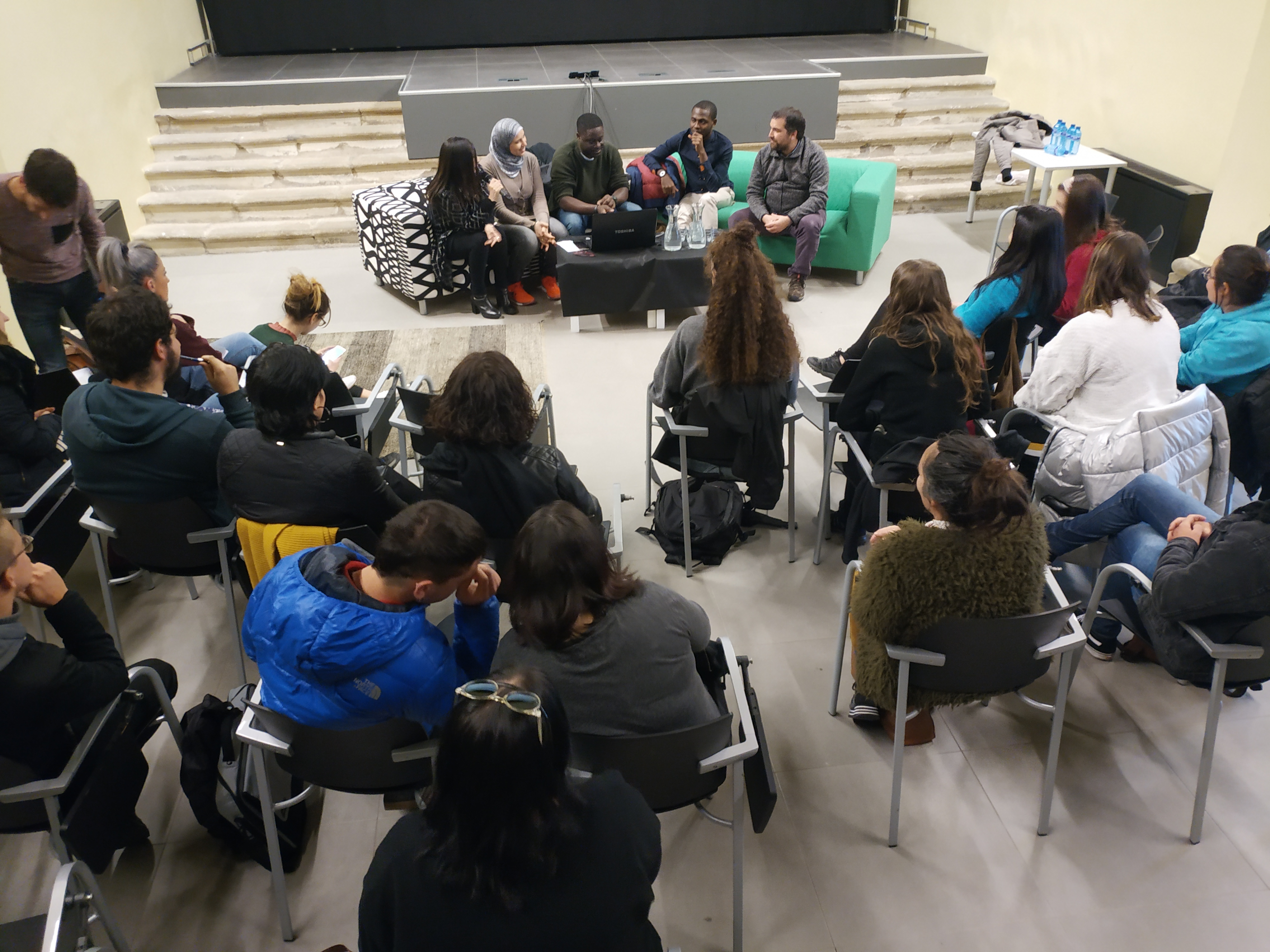
Wikimedia Education Conference, San Sebastian. 2019.

== See also ==
- French Wikipedia
- Spanish Wikipedia
