= Esperanto Wikipedia =

Esperanto-language edition of Wikipedia

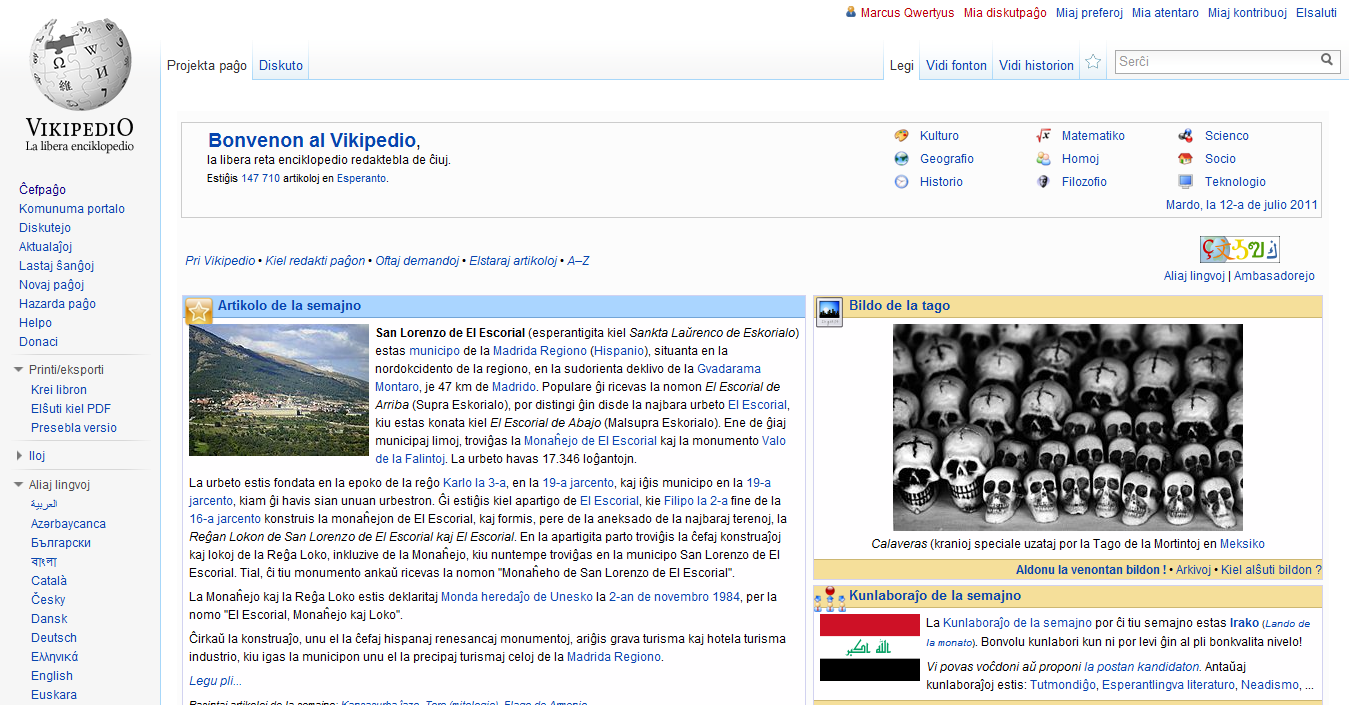
- Screenshot Main Page of the Esperanto Wikipedia in July 2011
- Website type: Online encyclopedia
- Available in: Esperanto
- Owner: Wikimedia Foundation
- Website: eo.wikipedia.org
- Commercial: No
- Registration: Optional
- Launched: 11 May 2001; 25 years ago
- Content license: Creative Commons Attribution/ Share-Alike 4.0 (most text also dual-licensed under GFDL); Media licensing varies

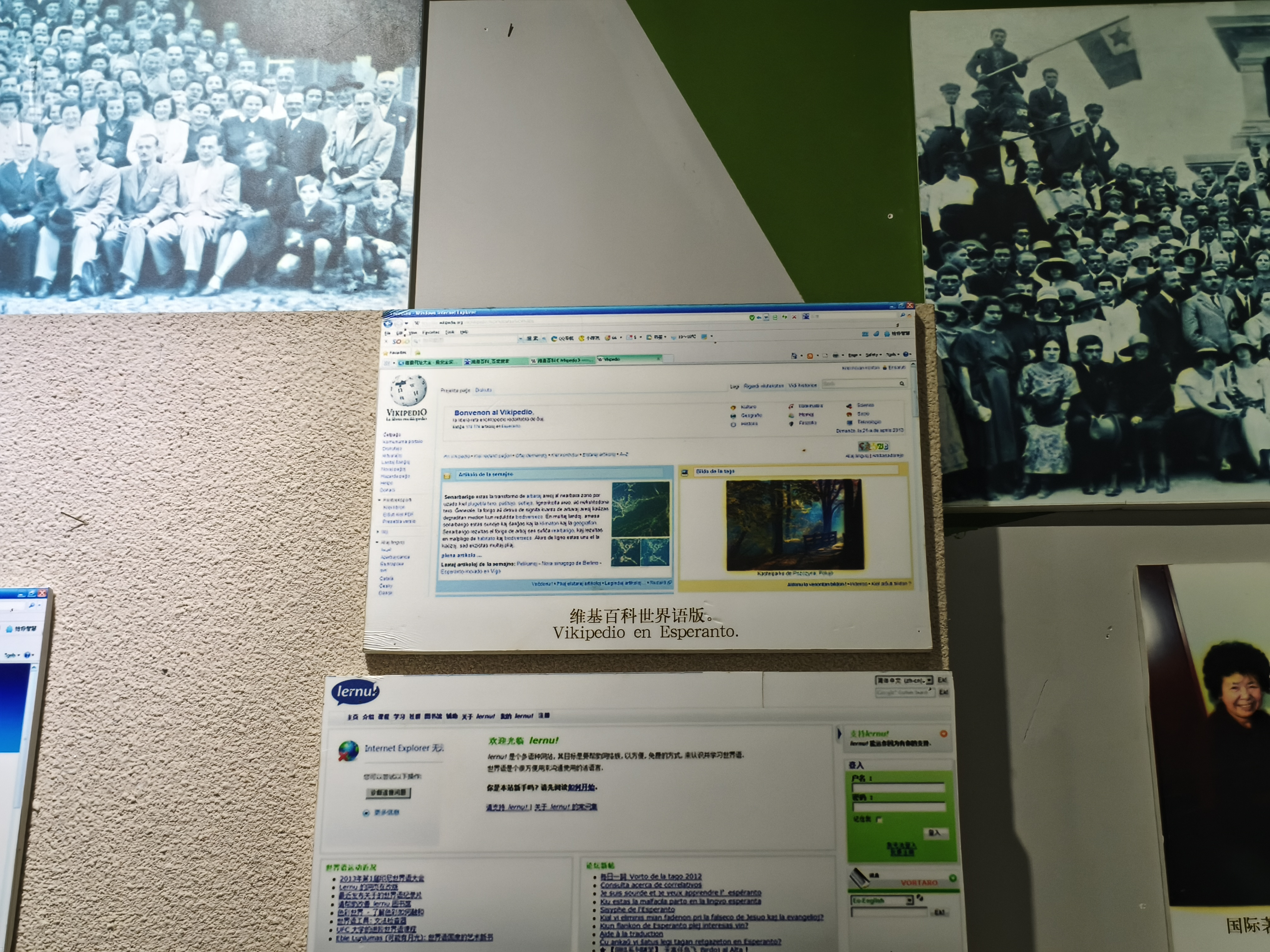
A screenshot of the main page of the Esperanto Wikipedia displayed on a wall in the exhibition hall of the International Esperanto Museum of Zaozhuang

The Esperanto Wikipedia (Esperanto: Vikipedio en Esperanto, IPA [vikipeˈdio en espeˈɾanto] or Esperanta Vikipedio [espeˈɾanta vikipeˈdio]) is the Esperanto version of Wikipedia, which was started on 11 May 2001, alongside the Basque Wikipedia. With approximately 390,000 articles as of 15 October 2026, it is the 38th-largest Wikipedia as measured by the number of articles, and the largest Wikipedia in a constructed language.

== Origin and influence ==
Chuck Smith, an American Esperantist, is considered to be the Esperanto Wikipedia's founder. The encyclopedia started off when he imported the 139 articles of the Enciklopedio Kalblanda by Stefano Kalb, which took him three weeks following 15 November 2001. Later on, he undertook a journey to Europe with the goal of popularizing Wikipedia among the speakers of Esperanto in European countries. In November 2002 he spoke about Wikipedia at the 10th Conference on the Application of Esperanto in Science and Technology in Dobřichovice (Czech Republic).

Esperanto speakers have also been involved in the founding of several other language versions of Wikipedia (Czech, Slovak, Ossetian, Swahili). The introduction of support for the Esperanto alphabet by Brooke Vibber, an Esperanto speaker and later Wikimedia Foundation's first employee, in January 2002 has paved the way for alphabets of languages other than English and initiated the transition of the whole Wikipedia to Unicode.

== Quality ==
Origin of edits (2014/12) Source
| Germany | 33.7% |
| Cuba | 10.5% |
| Netherlands | 7.5% |
| Unknown | 5.2% |
| France | 5.2% |
| Japan | 4.5% |
| United States | 3.7% |
| Spain | 3.4% |
| Poland | 3.0% |
| Switzerland | 2.2% |
| Russia | 2.2% |
| Georgia | 2.2% |
| Italy | 1.9% |
| United Kingdom | 1.9% |
| Australia | 1.5% |
| Argentina | 1.5% |
| Canada | 1.5% |
| Czech Republic | 1.1% |
| Croatia | 1.1% |
| Other | 6.6% |

As of January 2022, the Esperanto Wikipedia has 309 articles of feature quality (elstaraj artikoloj) and a further 279 considered worth reading (legindaj artikoloj). Weekly community projects include a Collaboration of the Week (kunlaboraĵo de la semajno) which improves neglected articles and an Article of the Week featuring good-quality articles on the front page. The Esperanto community is a frequent contributor to the Meta project, Translation of the week.

According to the list of Wikipedias by sample of articles at Meta, a list based on the list of articles every Wikipedia should have, Esperanto ranks 36th, lacking almost none of the list of vital articles, but having in general relatively short articles.

On 18 November 2008, the Esperanto Wikipedia implemented the Flagged Revisions extension.

As of February 2012, the Esperanto Wikipedia had the 5th greatest number of articles per speaker among Wikipedias with over 100,000 articles, and ranked 11th overall. These figures were based on Ethnologue's estimate of 2,000,000 Esperanto speakers.

Due to the geographical spread of its editors (see the box on the right), the Esperanto Wikipedia has a varied list of countries of origin of its editors.

On 13 August 2014, Esperanto Wikipedia reached 200,000 articles.

In the opening of 2021, ILEI published a text by Mireille Grosjean about the twentieth anniversary of the Esperanto Wikipedia. UEA followed, which, like ILEI, called for contributions with the aim of reaching 300,000 articles. That number was reached on 20 July 2021.

== Notability within the community ==
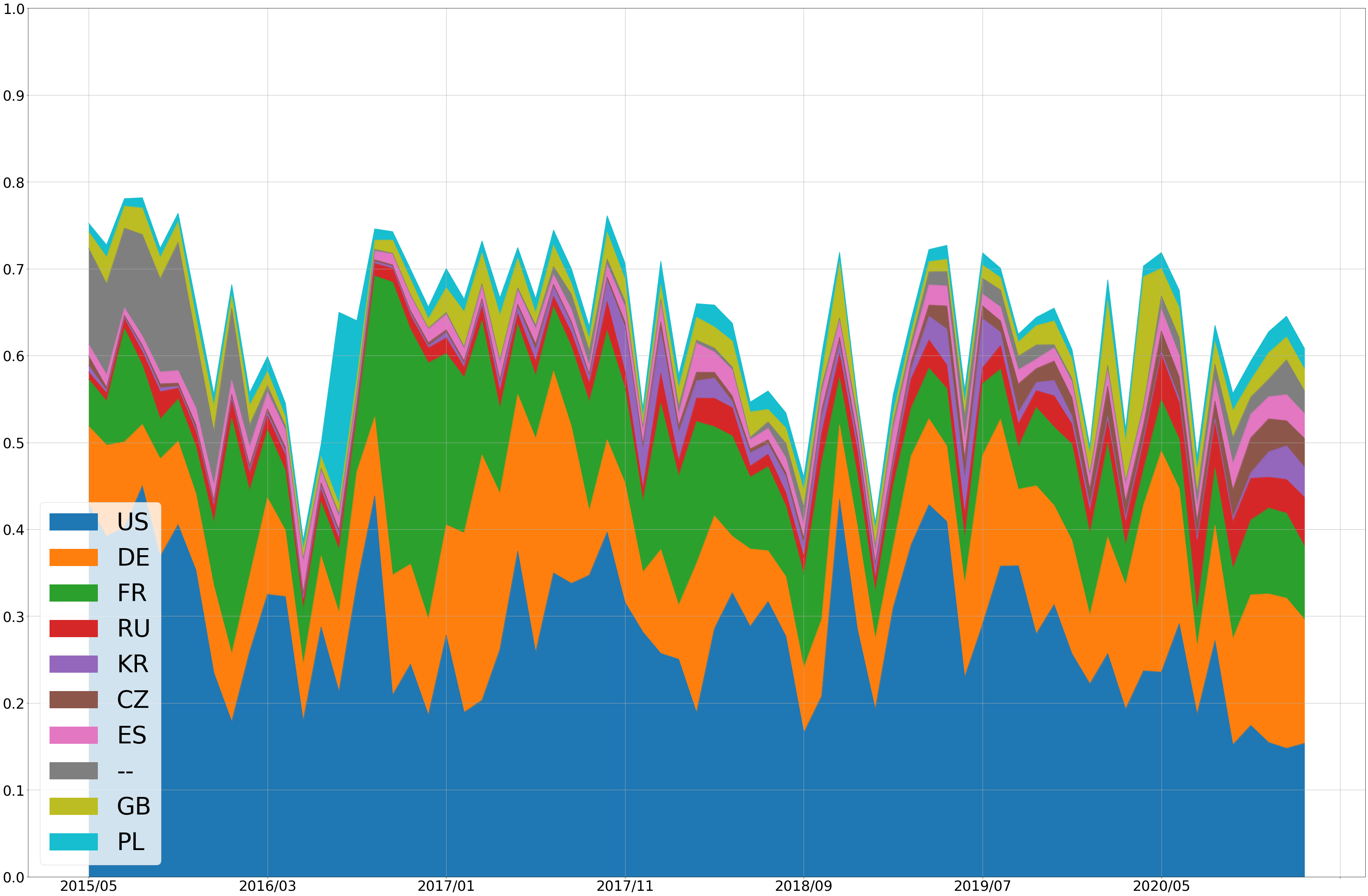
Origin of viewers on the Esperanto Wikipedia.

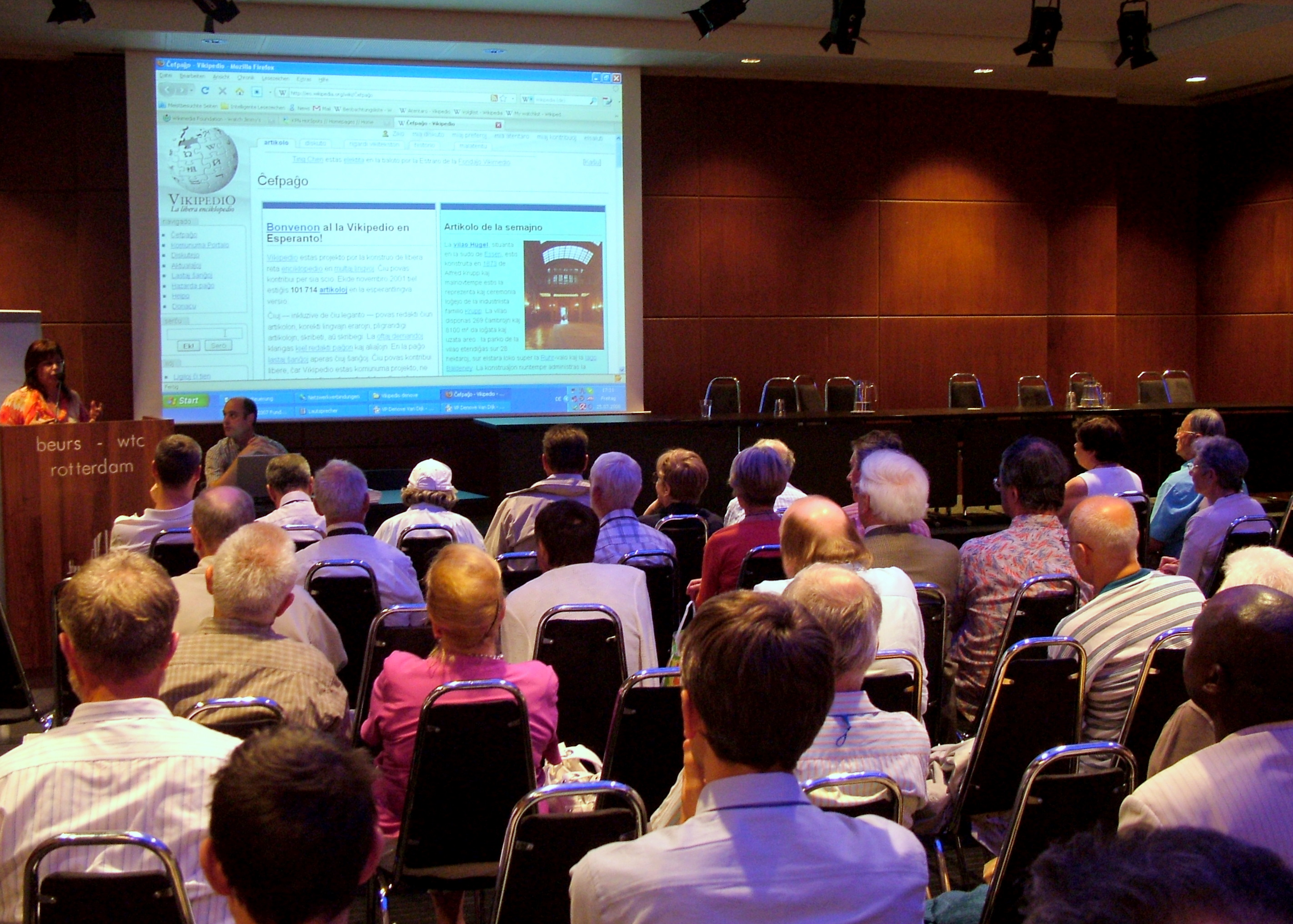
One of the Wikipedia meetups at World Esperanto Congress, Rotterdam 2008

At least three editors are members of the Academy of Esperanto: Gerrit Berveling, John C. Wells, and Bertilo Wennergren, a notable Esperanto grammarian and the director of the Academy's section about Esperanto vocabulary.

Vikipedio incorporates, with permission, the content of the 1934 Enciklopedio de Esperanto and also content from several reference books and the monthly periodical Monato.

The Esperanto Wikipedia has been featured in many Esperanto news media, including a radio interview at Radio Polonia, and articles at Esperanto, Kontakto, Libera Folio and [[Raporto.info|Raporto.info.]] The Esperanto Wikimania, a gathering held in 2011 to celebrate the encyclopedia's 10th anniversary, has been subsidized by the host city of Svitavy (Czech Republic) and the Pardubice Region and covered by Czech Television.

Esperanto organisations like Universal Esperanto Association do not contribute to Vikipedio but support it by providing chambers at Esperanto conventions for Vikipedio presentations and trainings. At the World Esperanto Congress in Rotterdam, summer 2008, there were two Wikipedian meetups and a lecture at the Esperantology Conference. In April 2013, ELiSo (Esperanto and Free Knowledge) was established as one of the first Wikimedia user groups.

=== Wikipedia handbook in Esperanto ===
The Esperanto Wikipedia community has created and published a 40-page Wikipedia: Practical Handbook (Esperanto: Vikipedio: Praktika Manlibro), which is sold online and at conventions. The manual is intended to give new Wikipedians advice and information on how to edit Wikipedia in Esperanto. It is currently in its second printing.

== Gallery ==
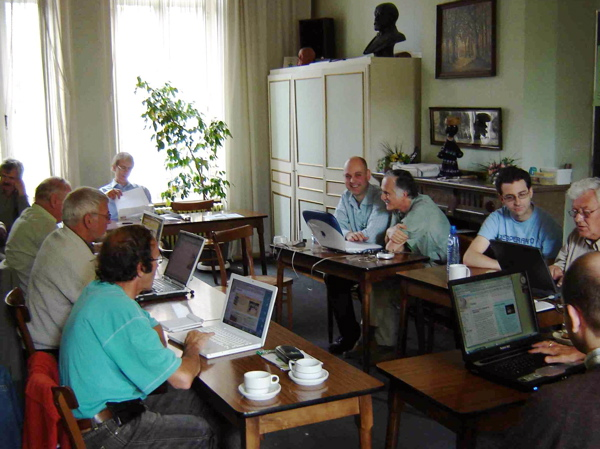
Wikipedia training at an Esperanto convention in Antwerp, May 2007

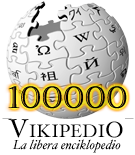
The Esperanto Wikipedia's 100K commemorative logo. (June 2008)

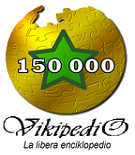
The Esperanto Wikipedia's 150K commemorative logo. (August 2011)

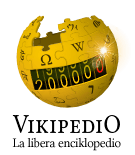
The Esperanto Wikipedia's 200K commemorative logo. (August 2014)

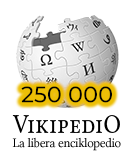
The Esperanto Wikipedia's 250K commemorative logo. (September 2018)

Video with congratulations on 300k articles. (January 2022)

== See also ==
- Esperanto literature
