= Encyclopedias in Esperanto =

Encyclopedias in Esperanto (Esperanto: Enciklopedioj de Esperanto) are Esperanto-language encyclopedias.

== History ==
In 1913, Petro Stojan proposed the Universal Monograph Encyclopedia (Esperanto: Universala Slipa Enciklopedio), which would be continuously published with separate monographs for each subject. The first five monographs ("The encyclopedia and its future", "Cinematic theory on time", the hymn "La Espero", "Transcription of proper names", and "Gathering", a poem by L. Levenzon) were published at that time.

In 1917, Vladimír Szmurlo published another encyclopedia in Petrograd called Ariadne's Thread, with a few references as "A first try of an Encyclopedia of Esperantism; with a firm belief that out of that . . . seed will grow a huge tree of the Universal Esperanto Encyclopedia." The first pages (1–88) were printed in Riga. Due to military circumstances, the next pages of the book appeared infrequently, only after the letter 'E', and with very short content.

== Enciklopedio de Esperanto ==
From 1933 to 1934, the Encyclopedia of Esperanto, an encyclopedia of the Esperanto movement, appeared in two editions of Literatura Mondo in Budapest. A reprint was published in Hungary by the Hungarian Esperanto Association in 1979 and 1986. The majority of the original articles in this encyclopedia have been made into Wikipedia articles on the Esperanto Wikipedia.

== Enciklopedio Kalblanda ==
In 1996, the Enciklopedio Kalblanda, an Internet Esperanto Wikipedia, was founded by Stephen Kalb. Kalb edited the encyclopedia until 2001, when he donated all 139 of the encyclopedia's articles to the Esperanto Wikipedia.

== Esperanto Wikipedia ==
In 2001, the Esperanto Wikipedia was launched.
