= Gerrit Berveling =

Dutch Esperanto author (born 1944)

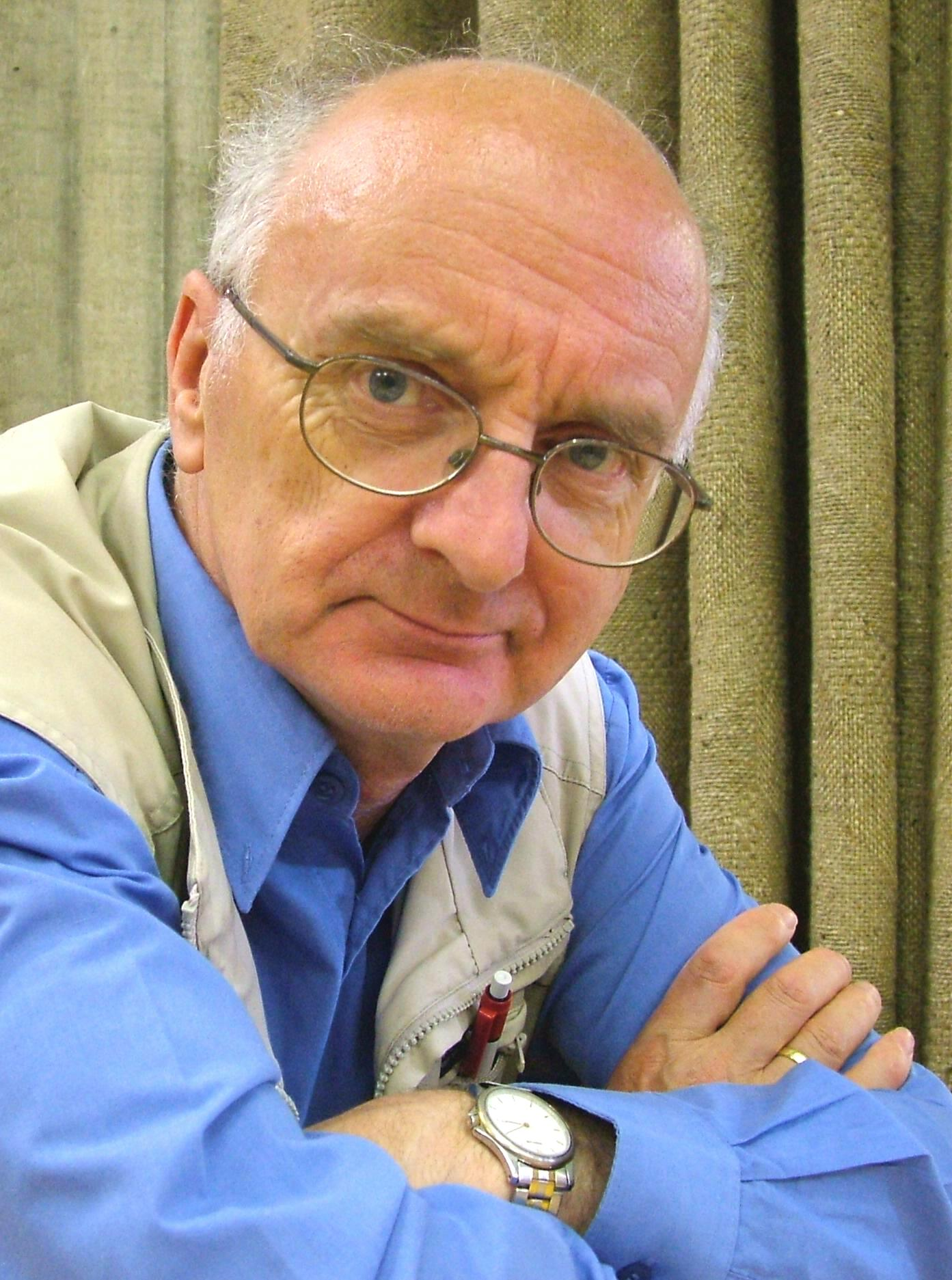
Gerrit Berveling in 2007

Gerrit Berveling (born 1 April 1944, Vlaardingen) is a Dutch Esperanto author.

== Biography ==
He studied Classical Languages (Latin and Greek) at Leiden University, and Theology at Utrecht and Leiden Universities. After 14 years of teaching general history and classical languages, he worked 14 years as a Remonstrant minister in different liberal Christian communities, and now is teaching classical languages again.

In Esperanto he is known as an original Esperanto poet, but mostly as a translator from Latin, Greek and Dutch. Besides, he is editor of a literary Esperanto revue, Fonto, appearing every month in Brazil.

He is one of many Esperantists who have joined the Esperanto Wikipedia. Along with fellow-Wikipedians John C. Wells and Bertilo Wennergren, a notable Esperanto grammarian and the director of the Academy's section about Esperanto vocabulary, Berveling is a member of the Academy of Esperanto.

== Works ==
=== Translations ===
==== From Latin ====
- Antologio Latina - Chapecó: Fonto (Serio Oriento-Okcidento; 30) - Two volumes, together 576 p.
- Catullus, Gaius Valerius: Amo malamo - Breda: VoKo,1991. - 24 p.(VoKo-numeroj; 10)
- Cicero, Marcus Tullius: La sonĝo de Skipiono (Marko Tulio Cicerono. From Latin by Hjalmar Johannes Runeberg and by Gerrit Berveling. - Breda: VoKo, 1994. - 24 p.(Voko-numeroj; 17)
- Cyprianus: La Unueco de la Katolika Eklezio - Zwolle: VoKo, 2006. - 44 p.(Voĉoj Kristanaj; 25)
- El tiom da jarcentoj: malgranda antologio de Latina poezio - Breda: VoKo, 1994. - 48 p.(VoKo-numeroj; 16)
- Erasmus, Desiderius: Laŭdo de l' stulteco (Ilustr. of Hans Holbein the Younger. Antaŭparolo: Humphrey Tonkin. Enkonduko: Albert Goodheir). - Rotterdam: Universala Esperanto-Asocio, 1988. - 111 p. : ilustr. (Serio Oriento-Okcidento; 24)
- Horatius Flaccus, Quintus: Romaj odoj - Breda: VoKo, 1991. - 24 p.(VoKo-numeroj; 9)
- Hus, Jan: Defendo de la libro pri la triunuo - Breda: VoKo, 1989. - 18 p.(Vo^coj kristanaj; 18)
- Martialis, Marcus Valerius: Da mav' estos neniam sat! - Breda: VoKo, 1991. - 20 p.(Voko-numeroj; 14)
- La pasiono de Perpetua kaj Feliĉita - Breda: VoKo, 1996. - 28 p.(Voĉoj kristanaj; 24)
- Sallustius Crispus, Gaius: La konspiro de Katilino - Chapecó: Fonto,1995. - 71 p.
- Seneca, Lucius Annaeus <Philosophus>: La apokolokintozo de l' Dia Klaŭdo - Breda: VoKo, 1990. - 24 p. (Voko-numeroj; 7)
- Seneca, Lucius Annaeus <Philosophus>: Konsolo al sia patrino Helvia - Breda: VoKo, 1990. - 32 p. (Voko-numeroj; 8)
- Seneca, Lucius Annaeus <Philosophus>: Oktavia - Antwerpen: Flandra Esperanto-Ligo, 1989. - 60 p.(Serio "Stafeto"; 9)
- Tertullianus, Quintus Septimus Florens: Apologio (Introduction, translation and comments by Gerrit Berveling. - Vlaardingen, 1980. - 95 p.(Voĉoj kristanaj; 2)
- Tertullianus, Quintus Septimus Florens: Kuraĝigo por la martiroj - Vlaardingen: VoKo, 1986. - 12 p.(Voĉoj kristanaj; 12)
- Tibullus, Albius: Elegioj - Breda: VoKo, 1998. - 76 p. (Voko-numeroj; 18)

==== From Dutch ====
- Berveling, Freya: Elekto de la poemoj de Freya, okaze de ŝia nupto al Wouter van Dam, 7 septembro 1992 - (poems) - Breda: VoKo, 1992. - 82 p.(Voko-numeroj; 15)
- Simon Carmiggelt: Morgaŭ denove ni vidu - (Short stories) - Antverpeno: FEL 2002, 128 p.
- Mulisch, Harry: Du virinoj (novel) - Chapecó: Fonto, 1992. - 140 p.
- La Remonstranta Frataro : informilo pri liberala eklezio nederlanda - Breda: VoKo, 1990. - 20 p.(Voĉoj kristanaj; 19)
- Warren, Hans: ŝtono de helpo (novel) - 's-Gravenhage: Esperanto Kultura Servo, 1989. - 72 p.
- Wert, G. M. W. R. de: Interveno ĉe la generado - etika vidpunkto (Ethical study). - Breda: VoKo, 1990. - 28 p.(Voĉoj kristanaj; 20)
- Sinkonservo (artikolaro pri nukleaj armiloj kaj kristanismo / de plurajautoroj. En red. de la Intereklezia Packonsiliĝo). (About Christianity and nuclear weapons)

==== From Hebrew ====
- Nombroj (from the Bible: Numbers) - Chapecó: Fonto, 1999. - 105 p.

==== From Classical Greek ====
- La duakanonaj libroj. (The Apocryphical Books) Ilustr. de Gustave Doré. - Chapecó: Fonto - Two volumes: 263 + 261 p.
- Herakleitos: La fragmentoj - Breda:VoKo, 1990. - 32 p.(VoKo-numeroj; 6)
- Jakobo <apostolo>: La Praevangelio laŭ Jakobo (apocryphical gospel) - Breda: VoKo, 1990. - 16 p.(Voĉoj kristanaj; 21)
- Johano <evangelisto>: La bona mesaĝo de Jesuo laŭ Johano - Chapecó: Fonto, 1992. - 92 p.(Fonto-kajeroj; 9)
- Lukianos: Lukio aŭ azeno (novel of Lucian) - Vlaardingen: VoKo,1988. - 40 p.(Vlardingenaj kajeroj; 4)
- Lukianos: Veraj Rakontoj (satirical novel) - Zwolle: VoKo, 2006. - 58 p.(VoKo-numeroj; 22)
- Luko <evangelisto>: La bona mesaĝo de Jesuo laŭ Luko - Chapecó: Fonto, 1992. - 90 p.(Fonto-kajeroj; 8)
- Marko <evangelisto>: La bona mesaĝo de Jesuo laŭ Marko - Chapecó: Fonto, 1992. - 64 p.(Fonto-kajeroj; 6)
- Mateo <evangelisto>: La bona mesaĝo de Jesuo laŭ Mateo - Chapecó: Fonto, 1992. - 84 p.(Fonto-kajeroj; 7)
- Paŭlo <apostolo>: La leteroj de Paŭlo kaj lia skolo - Chapecó: Fonto, 2004. - 255 p.

==== From diverse languages ====
- Maria Magdalena: La evangelio laŭ Maria Magdalena (presentation and translation of apocryphical gospel) - Vlaardingen: VoKo, 1985. - 12 p.(Voĉoj kristanaj; 8)
- Tomaso <apostolo>: La Evangelio kopta laŭ Tomaso - Breda: VoKo, 1994. - 16 p.(Vo^coj kristanaj; 22)

==== Into Dutch through Esperanto from Czech ====
Luisteren naar de ziel (Ekaŭdi la animon), de Věra Ludíková

=== Original writings ===
- Ajnasemajne; skizoj el la vivo de Remonstranta pastoro - Chapecó: Eld. Fonto, 2006. - 95 p. (About being a minister)
- ĉu ekzistas specifa Esperanto-kulturo? (En: Esperanto kaj kulturo - sociaj kaj lingvaj aspektoj : aktoj de la 19-a Esperantologia konferenco en la 81-a Universala Kongreso de Esperanto, Prago 1996; p. 29-32; Esperantological Study about Esperanto Culture.
- De duopo al kvaropo - Breda: VoKo, 1995. - 80 p. (Voko-numeroj; 20)
- Eroj el mia persona vivo (En: Lingva arto: jubilea libro oma^ge al William Auld kaj Marjorie Boulton/ Hrsg.: Benczik, Vilmos; p. 20 - 24
- Esperanto-literatuur van de laatste 25 jaar: enkele kanttekeningen - 's-Gravenhage: Vereniging "Esperanto Nederland", Afdeling Den Haag, 1994. - 28 p. Specifically about Esperanto Literature.
- Fadenoj de l' amo [Antauparolo: Aldo de' Giorgi]. - Chapecó: Eld. Fonto, 1998. - 104 p.(Fonto-serio; 37) (Small novel)
- Kanto pri Minotauro: kaj aliaj poemoj - Antwerpen: Flandra Esperanto-Ligo, 1993. - 135 p.(Serio "Stafeto"; 17) (poetry)
- Kie oni trovas tion en la Korano? - Vlaardingen: VoKo, 1986. - 32 p.(Serio "Voĉoj Kristanaj"; 11) (About Qur'an Texts)
- Kio fakte estis nova en la Renesanco? - EN: IKU Internacia Kongresa Universitato, 59a sesio, Florenco, Italio, 29 julio - 5 aŭgusto 2006. Eld. UEA
- Mia pado: tekstoj el 25 jaroj - Chapecó: Eld.Fonto, 1997. - 308 p.: bibliogr. p. 302 - 308(Fonto-serio; 35)
- La morto de Jesuo kaj kio poste? (En: La evangelio lau Petro / Petro <apostolo>; p. 8 (Theological study about apocryphical gospel)
- Streĉitaj koroj - Breda: VoKo, 1995. - 80 p. (Voko-numeroj; 21)
- Tradukado de bibliaj tekstoj, specife en Esperanto. Kelkaj personaj spertoj; Bibelübersetzung, insbesondere im Esperanto. Einige persönliche Erfahrungen <resumo>; Biblical translation, especially in Esperanto: Some personal experiences <resumo>/ - En: Studoj pri interlingvistiko: festlibro omaĝe al la 60-jariĝo de Detlev Blanke / Hrsg.: Fiedler, Sabine; p. 455 - 466 : bibliogr. p. 465 -466
- Tri 'stas tro (poemciklo) - Vlaardingen: VoKo,1987. - 44 p. : ilustr.(Vlardingenaj kajeroj; 2) (poetry)
- Trifolio (versaĵoj trilingve) - Vlaardingen: VoKo,1988. - 48 p.(Vlardingenaj kajeroj; 5) (poetry)
- La unuaj 25 jaroj en mia memoro - Breda: VoKo, 1994. -80 p. (Voko-numeroj; 19)
- Vojaĝimpresoj tra Siberio kaj Japanio - Chapecó - Eld. Fonto, 2008 - 143 p.
