= Akademio de Esperanto =

Language academy of Esperanto

Emblem of the Akademio de Esperanto

The Akademio de Esperanto (AdE; English: Academy of Esperanto) is an independent body of Esperanto speakers who steward the evolution of the language by keeping it consistent with the Fundamento de Esperanto in accordance with the Declaration of Boulogne. Modeled somewhat after the Académie française and the Real Academia Española, the Akademio was proposed by L. L. Zamenhof, the creator of Esperanto, at the first World Esperanto Congress, and was founded soon thereafter under the name Lingva Komitato (Language Committee). This Committee had a "superior commission" called the Akademio. In 1948, within the framework of a general reorganization, the Language Committee and the Academy combined to form the Akademio de Esperanto.

The Akademio consists of 45 members and has a president, vice presidents, and a secretary. The Academy also elects "Correspondents" -- eminent individuals who are not able to regularly participate in the work of the Academy, but would like to lend their name to it. The Academy is funded by a subsidy from the Universal Esperanto Association and by donations.

== Members ==
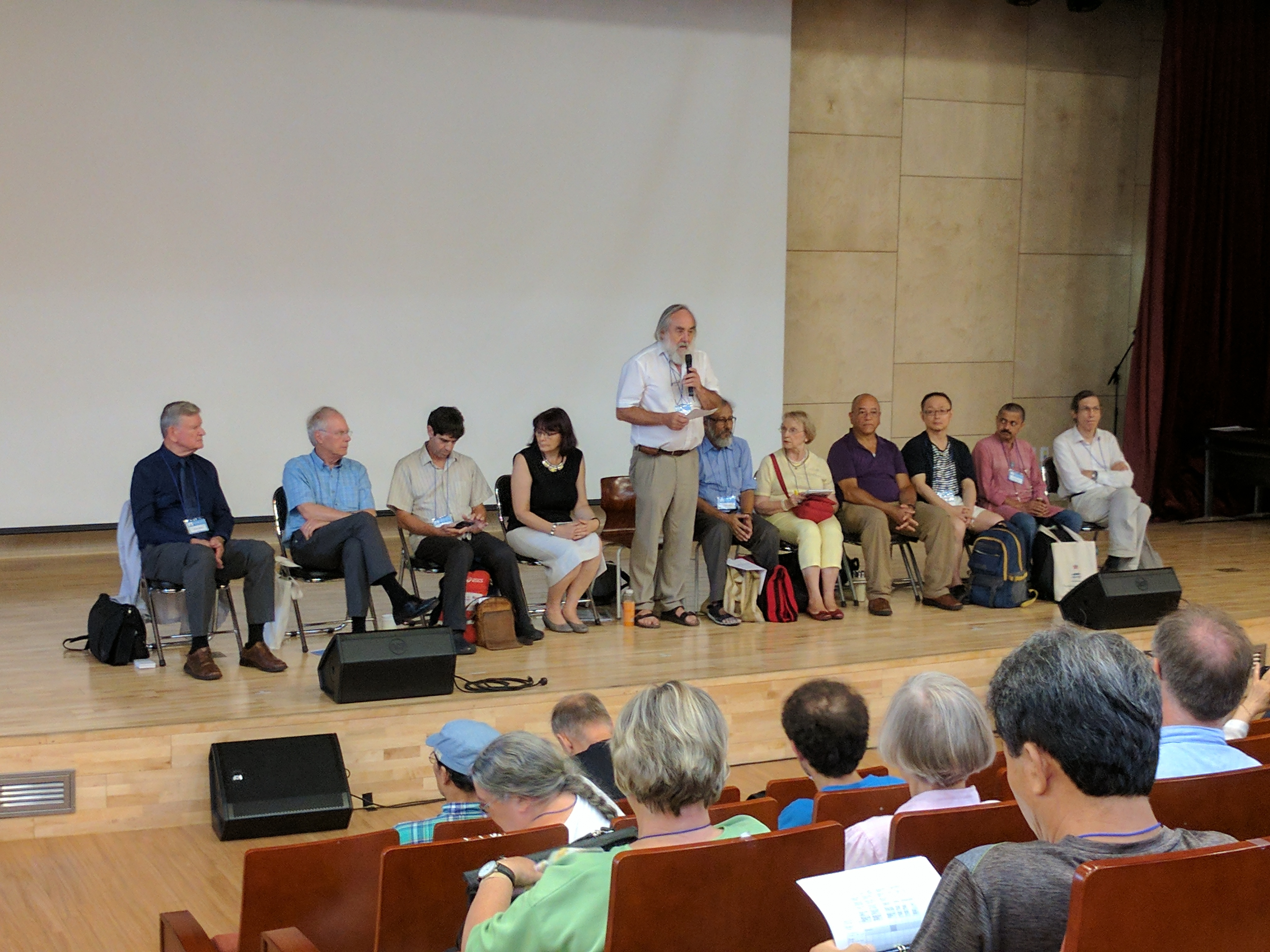
Members of the Akademio during the 102nd World Esperanto Congress in Seoul, South Korea, in 2017

Members are elected by their peers for a period of nine years, with elections being held every three years for a third of the members. Following the last elections in February 2025, the Akademio de Esperanto consists of the following members:

- Javier Alcalde
- BAK Giwan
- Marc Bavant
- Hans Becklin
- Cyril Robert Brosch
- Eckhard Bick
- Duncan Charters
- CHO Sung Ho
- Markos Kramer (Marcos Cramer)
- Probal Dasgupta
- Simon Davies
- Birke Dockhorn
- Mariana Evlogieva
- GONG Xiaofeng (Arko)
- Grant Goodall
- Edmund Grimley-Evans
- Nikolao Gudskov
- Maritza Gutiérrez González
- HIROTAKA Masaaki
- Jesper Jacobsen
- Ruth Kevess-Cohen
- LIU Haitao
- François Lo Jacomo
- Anna Löwenstein
- Ahmad Mamdoohi
- MAO Zifu
- Valentin Melnikov
- Lee Miller
- Carlo Minnaja
- Abel Montagut
- Brian Moon
- Pavel Mozhaev (Paŭlo Moĵajevo)
- Jorge Rafael (Rafa) Nogueras
- Marc van Oostendorp
- Tim Owen
- Paul Peeraerts
- Jukka Pietiläinen
- Fernando Pita
- A. Giridhar Rao
- Orlando E. Raola
- Nicola Ruggiero
- Alexander Shlafer
- Maria Rosaria (Sara) Spanò
- José Antonio Vergara
- Amri Wandel
- Bertilo Wennergren

Former members have included Gaston Waringhien, Rüdiger Eichholz, Jorge Camacho, Victor Sadler, Michel Duc-Goninaz, Lena Karpunina, and William Auld (president, 1979–1983).

== Correspondents ==
As of February 2025, these are the Correspondents of the Academy: Wael Al-Mahdi, Joakim Enwall, Sabine Fiedler, Federico Gobbo, Ingrid Maier, Melanie Maradan, Veronika Poór, Keyhan Sayadpour Zanjani, and Esther Schor.

== See also ==
- List of language regulators
- Baza Radikaro Oficiala
