= Czech Wikipedia =

Czech-language edition of Wikipedia

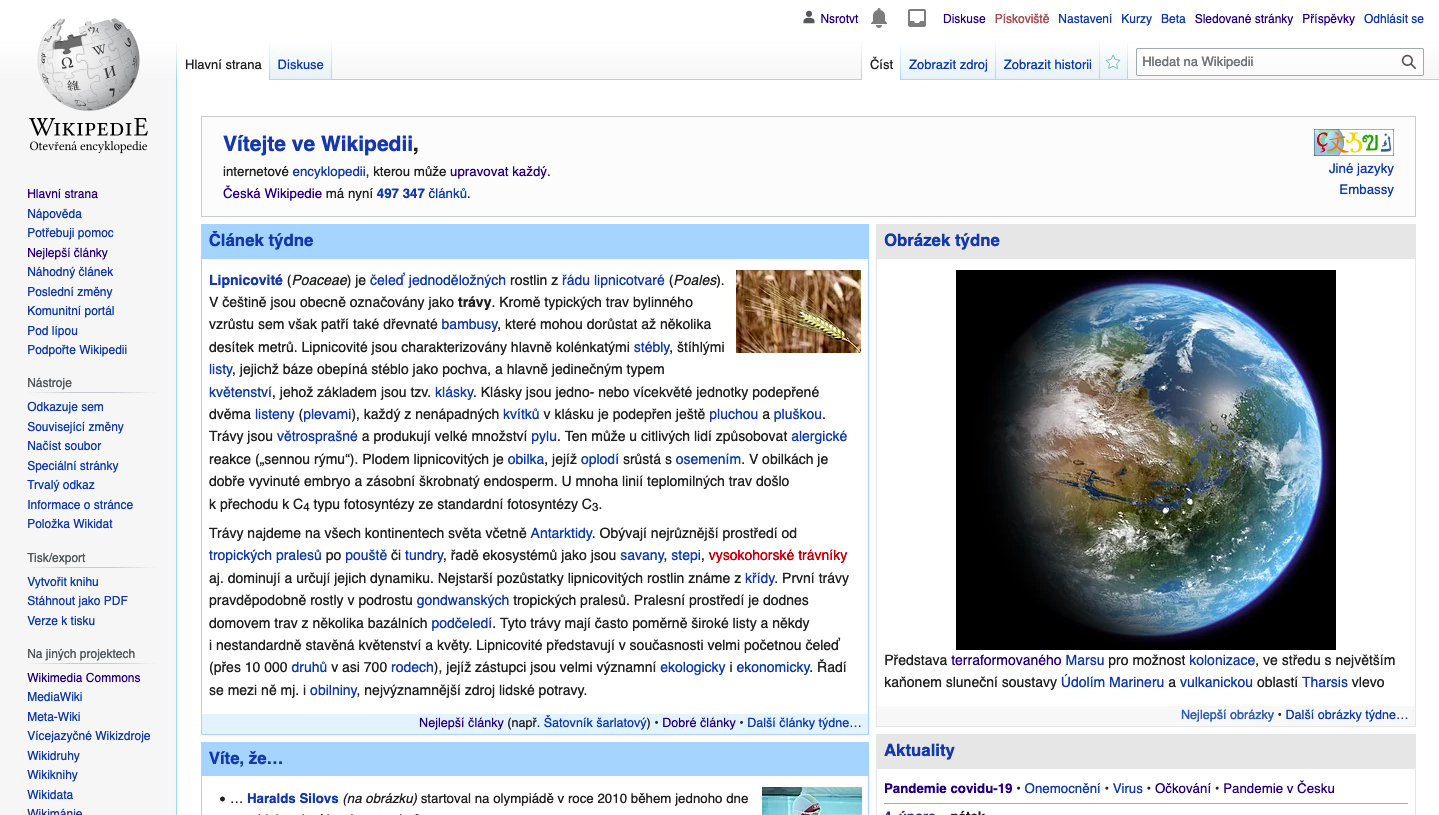
- Website type: Internet encyclopedia project
- Available in: Czech
- Headquarters: Miami, Florida
- Owner: Wikimedia Foundation
- Website: cs.wikipedia.org
- Commercial: No
- Registration: Optional
- Launched: 3 May 2002; 24 years ago
- Content license: Creative Commons Attribution/ Share-Alike 4.0 (most text also dual-licensed under GFDL); Media licensing varies

The Czech Wikipedia (Czech: Česká Wikipedie) is the Czech language edition of Wikipedia. Currently 4,016 active users and 30 administrators maintain the encyclopedia's 598,676 articles.

== History ==
It was created on 3 May 2002. However, at that time, Wikipedia ran on UseModWiki software. The three pages the Czech version had at the time were lost during the switch to MediaWiki. The oldest currently available edit is from when the Main Page was recopied on 14 November 2002. The user interface was localized and the first actual articles were written at the turn of 2002/2003 by a Czech editor of the Esperanto Wikipedia. Czech Wikipedia reached 1,000 articles, many about Esperanto topics, on 20 October 2003. An April 2004 report noted that it had 180 registered users at that time.

In June 2005, the Czech Wikipedia reached 10,000 articles and it reached 20,000 in December of the same year. The Main Page was re-designed with more details after reaching this milestone. By November 2006, it exceeded 30,000 articles, and became the 21st language version to exceed 100,000 articles in June 2008. As of 10 April 2015 there are more than 319,100 articles, 29 administrators, almost 293,000 registered users, and dozens of very active contributors. In December 2009, contributors to the Czech Wikipedia held a conference in Prague.

In 2008, the Czech NGO Wikimedia Česká republika (Wikimedia Czech Republic) was founded to support the Czech Wikipedia by organizing events, helping communication with authors of free content, and promoting the Czech Wikipedia to the public.

On 21 March 2019, Czech Wikipedia was temporarily shut down to protest against the articles 11 and 13 of the European Union. The decision was announced three days in advance on 18 March.

On 10 February 2021, an article by the Czech weekly magazine Respekt revealed how the Wikipedia combatted ongoing misinformation and source manipulation on their coverage of the Annexation of Crimea by the Russian Federation, by blocking disruptive editors and reverting dubious content over months of back and forth.

The Czech Wikipedia reached half a million articles in the afternoon of 16 March 2022. The statistics at this time also revealed there were 2,500 active editors and 34 administrators, 70 articles were being created per day on average, and the most actively edited article was the one on the Russian invasion of Ukraine. As of January 2024, It ranks among the best Wikipedias in retention of new editors.

As of October 2024, the Czech Wikipedia is the 28th biggest by article count, closely followed by the Hungarian Wikipedia and behind the Finnish Wikipedia.

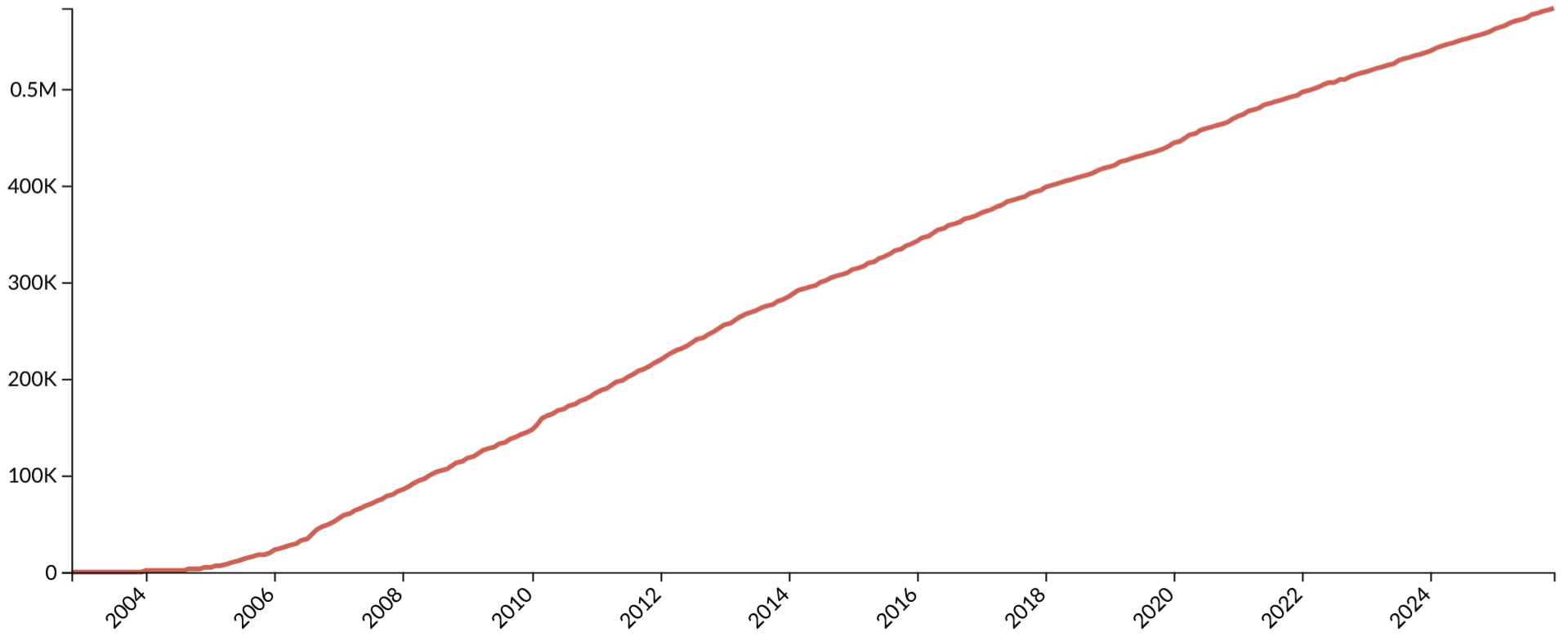
Article growth

The number of "very active editors" (at least 100 edits per month) has stayed rather stable since ca. 2008.

== See also ==
- Slovak Wikipedia
