= Baza Radikaro Oficiala =

List of Esperanto root words

Baza Radikaro Oficiala (BRO) is a work published by the Academy of Esperanto. It sorts the basic roots of Esperanto's vocabulary according to meta-frequency: more precisely, according to the frequency of occurrence in frequency lists.

The list results from a comparison of various earlier frequency lists set up according to very different criteria. According to the frequency of roots in these lists, the roots are then arranged into nine groups, so that in the first group are found those roots that appear in most of these frequency lists, in the second group are found those roots which appear second-most, through the ninth group, where the roots that appear in the fewest frequency lists are found.

BRO was part of the Acts of the Academy II 1968-1974.

It is now a searchable part of the online Akademia Vortaro.
