= Enciklopedio Kalblanda =

First online encyclopedia on the esperanto language

Enciklopedio Kalblanda IPA: [ent͡siklopeˈdi.o kalˈblanda]
- A full screenshot of a saved page in the Internet Archive
- Website type: Online encyclopedia
- Available in: Esperanto
- Owner: Stephen Kalb
- Creator: Stephen Kalb
- Website: mebsuta.com (at Internet Archive)
- Commercial: no
- Launched: January 11, 1996 (on Pobox); January 11, 1996 (on mebsuta.com)
- Current status: inactive

Enciklopedio Kalblanda (transl. Kalb-land Encyclopedia) was the first online encyclopedia written in the Esperanto language. It was founded on January 11, 1996 by Stephen Kalb, who was the general editor. The encyclopedia contained 139 articles linked to 85 other themes. The text of the encyclopedia (though not the pictures) is under the GFDL.

In December 2001, Kalb donated his 139 articles to the Esperanto Wikipedia, to be expanded. It is linked on Vikipedio as Enciklopedio Kalblanda. He now contributes directly to Vikipedio.

== Imported articles ==
- Adventismo
- Akvino
- Albiganismo
- Angla lingvo
- Aristotelo
- Asimov
- Auxgusteno
- astekoj
- Bakono
- Bangladesxo
- Baza angla
- Biblio
- Botticelli
- Brazilo
- Cassie Bernall
- Chaucer
- Cxifrado
- Cxinio
- Daniel Dennett
- Danto
- Darvino
- denaro
- Egipto
- Ejnstejno
- Elizabeth Taylor
- Ellen G. White
- Epikuro
- Esperanto
- enciklopedio
- Franca lingvo
- Francio
- Galileo
- Germanio
- Gnostikismo
- Gxavo
- Giotto
- Gxuangzio
- Hegelo
- Hindio
- Hispana lingvo
- Hobbes
- Hume
- Indonezio
- Interlingvao
- Isfahano
- Islamo
- Itala lingvo
- Italio
- JSP
- Japanio
- Jesuo Kristo
- Johano Pauxlo la 2-a
- Johano de la Kruco
- Joyce
- Judismo
- Jupitero
- Kalvino
- Kantio
- Kartezio
- Katolikismo
- Keplero
- Koperniko
- Korano
- Kristanismo
- Kubrick
- La Dekologo
- La Kredo Nicea
- Laozio
- Latina lingvo
- Latino sen fleksio
- Lenino
- Leonardo
- Locke
- Lojxbano
- Luno
- Lutero
- MVC
- Makiavelo
- Marciono
- Markso
- Marso
- Meksiko
- Merkuro
- Modernismo
- Mohameto
- Nag-Hamado
- Naomi Campbell
- Neptuno
- Neuxtono
- Origeno
- Ortodoksismo
- Orwell
- Osama Bin-Laden
- Ovidio
- Pakistano
- Platono
- Plotino
- Plutono
- Pregxoj
- Protestantismo
- Ptolomeo
- Q Evangelio
- RFK
- Rauxmismo
- Rousseau
- Rozario
- Rusio
- Sankta Andreo
- Sankta Francisko
- Sankta Gregoro Nisseno
- Sankta Ireneo
- Sankta Johano
- Sankta Maria
- Sankta Nikolao
- Sankta Pauxlo
- Sankta Tereza
- Sankta Tomaso
- Saturno
- Signoj
- Spinozo
- Stefano KALB
- Suda Koreio
- Ŝekspiro
- TCP-IP
- TTT
- Teotihuakano
- Tero
- Tolkien
- Turing
- Turkio
- Unamuno
- Urano
- Usono
- Venuso
- Vergilio
- Vjet-Namo
- William Blake
- XML
- Zvinglo
