= Vladimir Szmurlo =

- Владимир Францевич Шмурло
- Szmurlo circa 1910
- Born: Vladimir Frantsevich Shmurlo; July 15, 1865; Chelyabinsk, Russia
- Died: February 27, 1931 (aged 65); Riga, Latvia

Vladimír von Szmurlo (pronounced "shmurlo"; 1865–1931) was a Russian Esperantist and railway engineer.

== Life ==
He studied in Saint Petersburg. Before learning Esperanto, he spoke the earlier auxiliary language of Volapük, but was nonetheless very quick to adopt Esperanto. He launched the first Esperanto literature competition in Saint Petersburg in 1896. In 1905, following the Russian Revolution he moved to Stuttgart until 1908, when he moved to Riga, where he lived until his death. In 1910 he founded the Esperanto association La Riga Stelo and became its first president. From 1910 to 1915 he was a UEA delegate in Riga.

He worked with others on publications such as La Esperantisto, Internacia Scienca Revuo, Lingvo Internacia and Scienca Gazeto. He edited and published the magazine Riga Stelo, from 1910 to 1911. He wrote ANA (Alfabeta Nomaro-Adresaro), also known as Ariadna fadeno ("Ariadne's Thread"), a first attempt at an Esperanto encyclopedia, from 1914 to 1917. However, because of World War I, he was forced to flee from Riga and publish the work in two separate volumes, which were never published in their combined state until 1993.

Szmurlo also compiled a Complete Russian-Esperanto Dictionary in 1916. In his last years, he was interested principally in the various systems and institutions of the Lingvo Internacia (Esperanto, as it is most commonly known today).

In 1920 he created a derivative auxiliary language called Arlingo, based on Esperanto, which was never published.

He also worked as a technician on the Trans-Siberian Railroad.

== Published ==
- Biblioteko de Lingvo Internacia Esperanto, ("Library of the International Language Esperanto") (1895)
- Jarlibro Esperantista ("Esperantist's Yearbook") (1897)
- Esperanta Universalbiblioteko ("Esperanto Universal Library") (1910-1914)
- a collection of original works in Esperanto Verda Radio (1911)
