= Bertilo Wennergren =

Swedish Esperantist (born 1956)

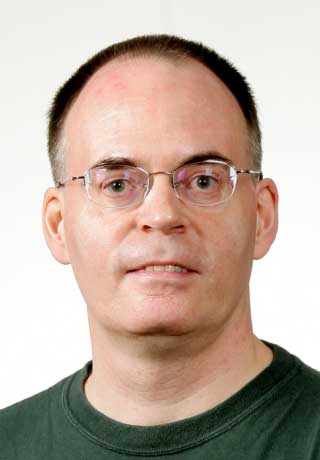
Bertilo Wennergren

Bertilo Wennergren (Swedish: Bertil Wennergren; Esperanto pronunciation: [berˈtilo ˈveneɡren]; born 4 October 1956) is a Swedish Esperantist living in the village of Schossin in northern Germany.

== Biography ==
Having spoken Esperanto since 1980, he became a member of the Esperanto Academy in 2001 and holds the post of director of the Academy's General Dictionary section. He is author of the books Plena Manlibro de Esperanta Gramatiko (Complete Manual of Esperanto Grammar) and Landoj kaj lingvoj de la mondo (Lands and Languages of the World). He is also the author of a Swedish-language book to teach Esperanto.

Wennergren was a member of the Amplifiki band, and is now a member of Persone. In 2002 he married the Esperantist Birke Dockhorn.

On 19 December 2006 the journal La Ondo de Esperanto named him as Esperantist of the Year for 2006 in recognition of his Plena Manlibro de Esperanta Gramatiko.

Wennergren is one of many Esperantists of all levels who have joined the Esperanto Wikipedia. A noted Esperanto grammarian and the director of the Academy's section about Esperanto vocabulary, he is one of least three editors who are members of the Academy of Esperanto, the others being Gerrit Berveling and John C. Wells.

== See also ==
- Esperanto music
