= Slovak Wikipedia =

Slovak-language edition of Wikipedia

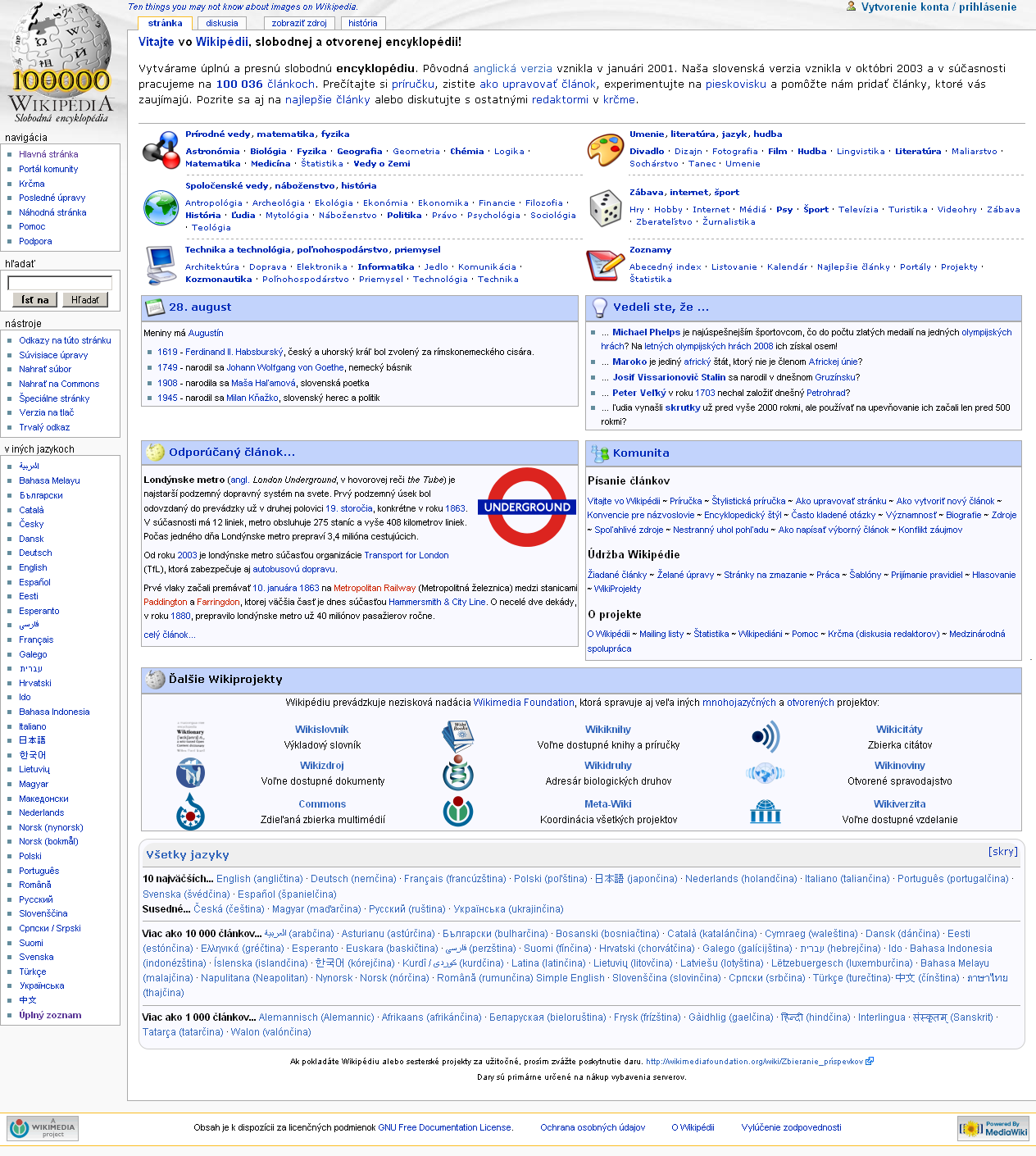
- Screenshot Slovak Wikipedia Main Page on 28 August 2008
- Website type: Internet encyclopedia project
- Available in: Slovak
- Headquarters: Miami, Florida
- Owner: Wikimedia Foundation
- Website: sk.wikipedia.org
- Commercial: No
- Registration: Optional
- Launched: 23 September 2003; 22 years ago
- Content license: Creative Commons Attribution/ Share-Alike 4.0 (most text also dual-licensed under GFDL); Media licensing varies

The Slovak Wikipedia (Slovak: Slovenská Wikipédia) is the edition of Wikipedia in Slovak. It was started on before 23 September 2003, only becoming active in the summer of 2004. It cleared the 15,000-article mark in September 2005, the 50,000-article mark in August 2006 and the 100,000 article mark in August 2008. The Slovak Wikipedia had over 170,000 articles as of 28 March 2012. It cleared the 200,000-article mark on 5 February 2015.

The Slovak Wikipedia is among the largest Slavic-language Wikipedia editions. There are many short bot-generated articles in the Slovak Wikipedia.

== Gallery ==
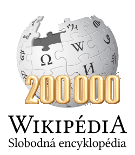
Slovak Wikipedia's 200,000 article logo (5 February 2015)

== See also ==
- Czech Wikipedia
