= Plena Manlibro de Esperanta Gramatiko =

- Author: Bertilo Wennergren
- Published: 2005, 2013, 2016, 2020
- Publisher: E@I in cooperation with La Ranetoj
- Pages: 758 (v15.0.6)
- ISBN: 978-0-939785-07-0
- OCLC: 311169563

Plena Manlibro de Esperanta Gramatiko (PMEG, English: Complete Manual of Esperanto Grammar) is a book which explains Esperanto grammar in an easy-to-learn format. It was mostly written by Bertilo Wennergren and is for ordinary Esperanto speakers who want to study Esperanto's grammar, word construction, writing and pronunciation.

It does not use traditional grammatical terminology, which makes it easier to understand than traditional grammar textbooks. Examples of the terms used are "O-vorto" (O-word) instead of "substantivo" (noun, substantive) and "rolvorteto" (little role word) instead of "prepozicio" (preposition). These new grammatical terms are also more suitable to describe Esperanto than traditional terms. For example, using traditional terminology, the words "tiu" (that one), "ambaŭ" (both) and "ties" (that one's) would be adjectives, but they behave very differently than the adjectives ending in "a"; the word "A-vorto" (A-word) groups words that behave similarly together.

PMEG is mainly a practical guide and not really a theoretical work for linguists, unlike the Plena Analiza Gramatiko (Complete Analytical Grammar), which was regarded as "the largest research project into Esperanto's grammar" until PMEG's publication.

Since 1995 it has existed on the Internet. In 2005, a printed version, published by Esperanto-USA, was made available for purchase. A revised second edition was released in 2020, and is sold through E@I.

Only Wennergren is responsible for PMEG's contents, but many other people helped with the making of this book.

The Esperanto pronunciation of the acronym PMEG would be po mo e go but the book is often instead called the Pomego as a pun: pomego means "giant apple".
