= Amri Wandel =

- עמרי ונדל
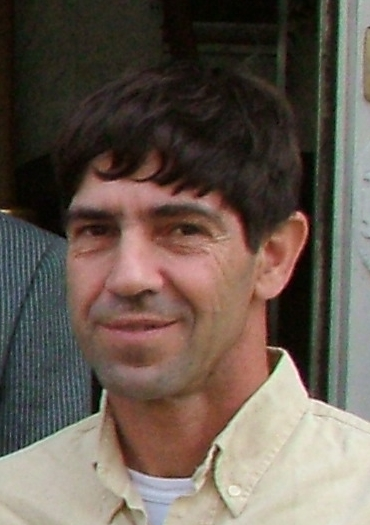
- Wandel at the World Esperanto Association Conference, 2005
- Born: 1954 (age 71–72); Tel Aviv, Israel
- Citizenship: Israel
- Known for: Senior Scientist at the Racah Institute of Physics at the Hebrew University of Jerusalem; Chairman of the Israeli Association for Astrobiology and the Beginning of Life; Former chairman of the Esperanto Association in Israel
- Scientific career
- Fields: Astrophysics
- Workplaces: The Racah Institute of Physics at the Hebrew University of Jerusalem

Amri Wandel (Hebrew: עמרי ונדל; born 1954) is a senior scientist in Astrophysics at the Racah Institute of Physics at the Hebrew University of Jerusalem. Wandel is an expert in astrobiology and chairman of the Israeli Association of Astrobiology and Early Life. He was also president of the International Academy of Sciences San Marino from 2016 until its dissolution in 2020.

His main research topics are high-energy astrophysics, black holes, active galaxies, quasars, and astrobiology. He has published over 100 professional articles in the world's leading journals in the field of astrophysics.

Wandel is also very active in the international and Israeli Esperanto movement.

== Biography ==
Amri Wandel was born in 1954 in Tel Aviv.

In 1974 he completed his bachelor's degree in physics and computer science at Tel Aviv University. In the years 1974-1980 he served in the IDF. He then went on to pursue a master's degree in physics, which he also completed at Tel Aviv University in 1978. In 1980 went on to pursue a doctorate in astrophysics at Stony Brook University. From 1983 to 1988, he held post-doctoral positions in astrophysics at Princeton University, the University of Maryland, and Stanford University. After returning to Israel, he began working as a researcher at the Weizmann Institute in 1988. Wandel remained at the Weizmann Institute until 1990, when he began working at the Hebrew University. In 1999 he created the course "Astrophysics and Life in the Universe", which he also teaches. Wandel serves as a senior scientist at the Racah Institute of Physics at the Hebrew University of Jerusalem.

In the year 1998–1999 he was a visiting professor, on sabbatical at the Department of Astronomy at the University of California, Los Angeles (UCLA), where he taught four astrophysics courses. In that year Wandel collaborated at UCLA on research of Active Galactic Nuclei together with Professor Math Malkan which produced three groundbreaking papers on the subject of massive black holes. One of their articles, which was the first to present the relationship between the mass and luminosity of massive black holes in active galaxies, was cited about 600 times. Consequently, Wandel and Malkan won a research grant from the BSF Foundation. Since then, Wandel has been teaching summer courses at UCLA every few years, as well as conducting research collaborations.

Since 2018, he has been the chairman of the Israeli Association for Astrobiology and the Beginning of Life.

Wandel is president of the International Academy of Sciences San Marino.

A sample from his lecture "Life in Distant Worlds" seals the song "There is no space between us" by the Israeli rapper Tuna on his album "And now for the intergalactic part". The recording is sampled and as if from a walkie-talkie Wandel says: "Actually some people think it's on the frontier of science fiction. But as we shall see, there is a great deal of non-fiction science, which prepares us to answer the question man has always asked himself - are we alone?"

== Esperanto ==
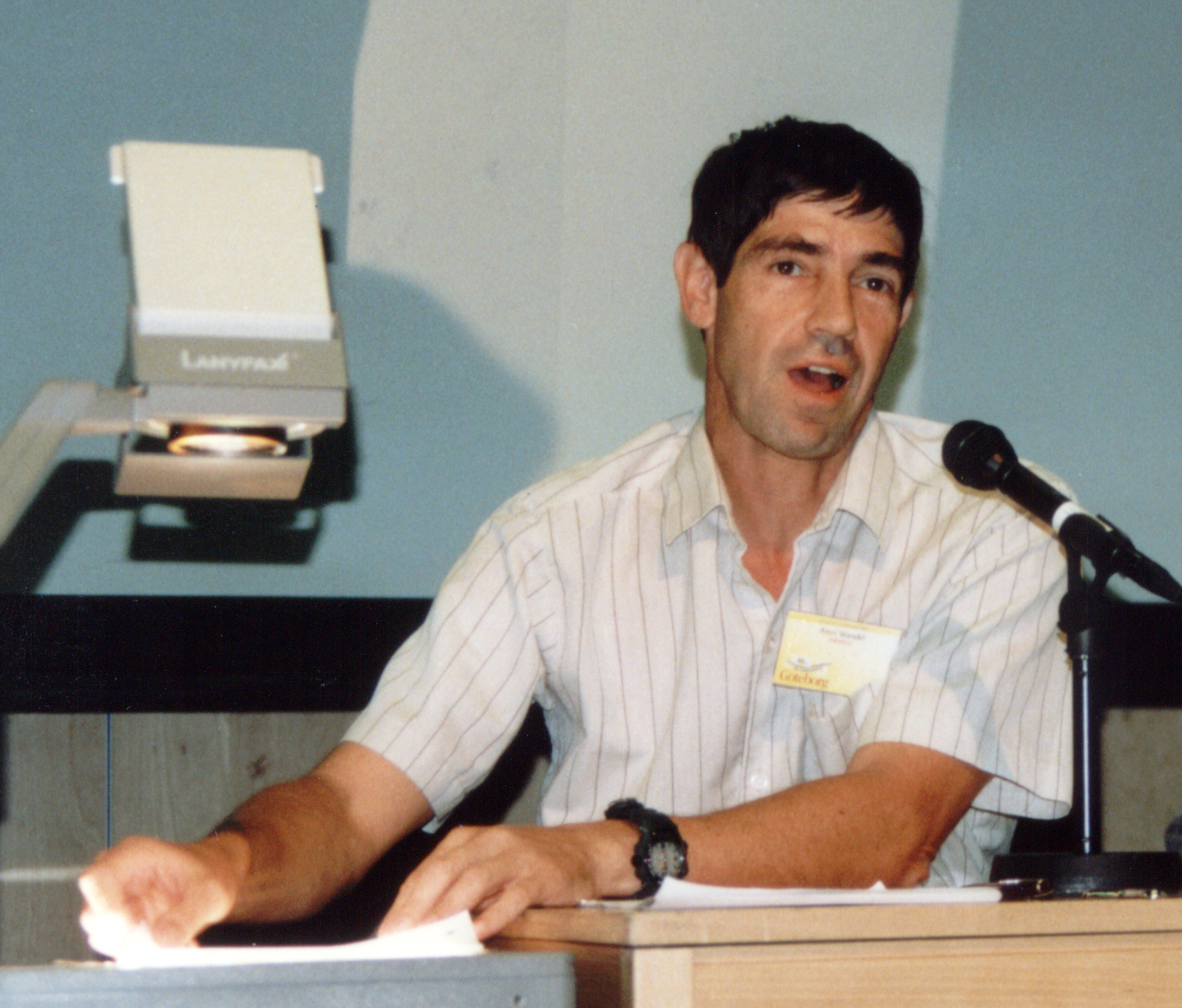
Wandel at the World Esperanto Congress, Gothenburg, 2003

In 1992 he joined the International Academy of Esperanto (AN). Since 1995, Wandel has been a member of the board of the World Esperanto Association, albeit on breaks. In Israel, he served as chairman of the Israel Esperanto Association from 2008–2019 and editor of its journal, Israela Esperantisto. Since 2020, he is a plain member of the association's board. In 2015, he published a study on the number of Esperanto speakers on social networks, which reached an estimated two million speakers. This study has become the accepted reference for the number of Esperanto speakers in the world and is even quoted by Ethnologue.

In 2012, he recorded an online 33-lesson Esperanto version of his astrophysics course at the Hebrew University of Jerusalem, as part of the "University of Esperanto".

In Wandel's view, as long as the current situation persists and the linguistic status quo prevails, preferring one national language over the others, there will be no room for widespread Esperanto as a language of communication and it will remain the domain of a relatively small user public. However, in his view, this situation may change if and when the international, economic and political forces change in the direction of greater balance between the major languages, and the need for a single language of communication increases. In such a situation, a neutral and easy-to-learn language is likely to be chosen. In Wandel's view, Esperanto is the only language with this qualities, as well as the only one that is also a living and spoken language, so it will be the natural candidate for this position.

Amri Wandel's article "Esperanto and the Problem of International Communication" appeared in the 2009 Hebrew Expression and Language Israeli state Examination. Originally, the article was published in "Almost 2000 - Journal of Science and Technology".

== His books ==
- La Kosmo kaj ni: Galaksioj, steloj, planedoj kaj vivo en la universo (Esperanto for: The cosmos and us: galaxies, stars, planets and life in the universe), 2001, 2005, 2017.

== Translations ==
Wandel has translated several books into Esperanto, including:

- "Esperanto”, a short story on the kibbutz life, from the book "Between Friends" by Amos Oz (published by the Esperanto Association in Israel, Tel Aviv, 2015).
- "Evening has set", an adaptation of Fanya Bergstein's lull story by Hans Christian Andersen (1987).
- "The Crab That Played with the Sea", from Rudyard Kipling's "Just So Stories".
