= Ossetian Wikipedia =

Ossetian-language edition of Wikipedia

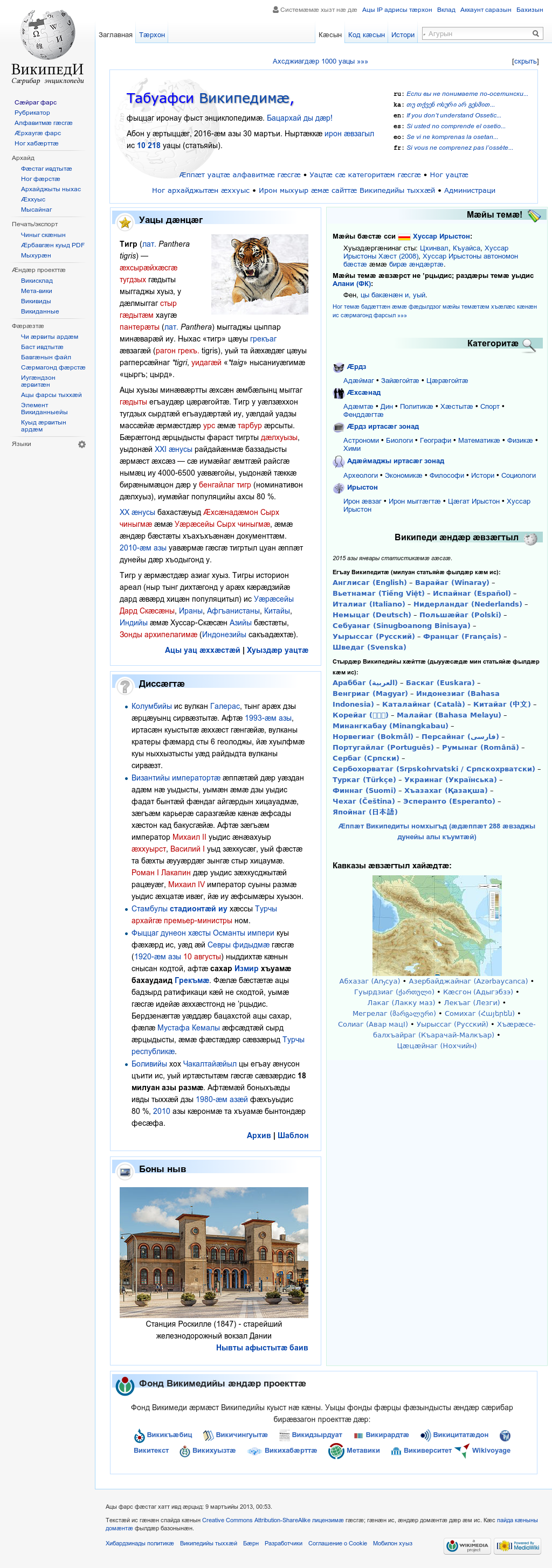
- Screenshot Main Page of the Ossetian Wikipedia in March 2016
- Website type: Internet encyclopedia
- Owner: Wikimedia Foundation
- Website: os.wikipedia.org
- Commercial: No
- Registration: Optional
- Users: 28,749 registered accounts 72 contributors (Note: Contributors are users who edited at least 10 times since they registered.) (Feb. 2015)
- Launched: 28 February 2005; 21 years ago
- Content license: Creative Commons Attribution/ Share-Alike 4.0 (most text also dual-licensed under GFDL); Media licensing varies

The Ossetian Wikipedia (Iron Ossetic: Ирон Википеди, romanized: Iron Vikipedi) is the Ossetian-language edition of the free online encyclopedia Wikipedia. It was created on 28 February 2005. With approximately 22,000 articles, it is currently the 137th-largest Wikipedia as measured by the number of articles. Since its creation, the Ossetian Wikipedia has been called "what is perhaps the only website written entirely in Ossetian."

On 3 March 2010, the Ossetian Wikipedia made headlines in local newspapers for reaching a double milestone. The edition was five years old and had just passed the 5000 articles threshold.
