= Ingrid Maier =

German-Swedish philologist and historian

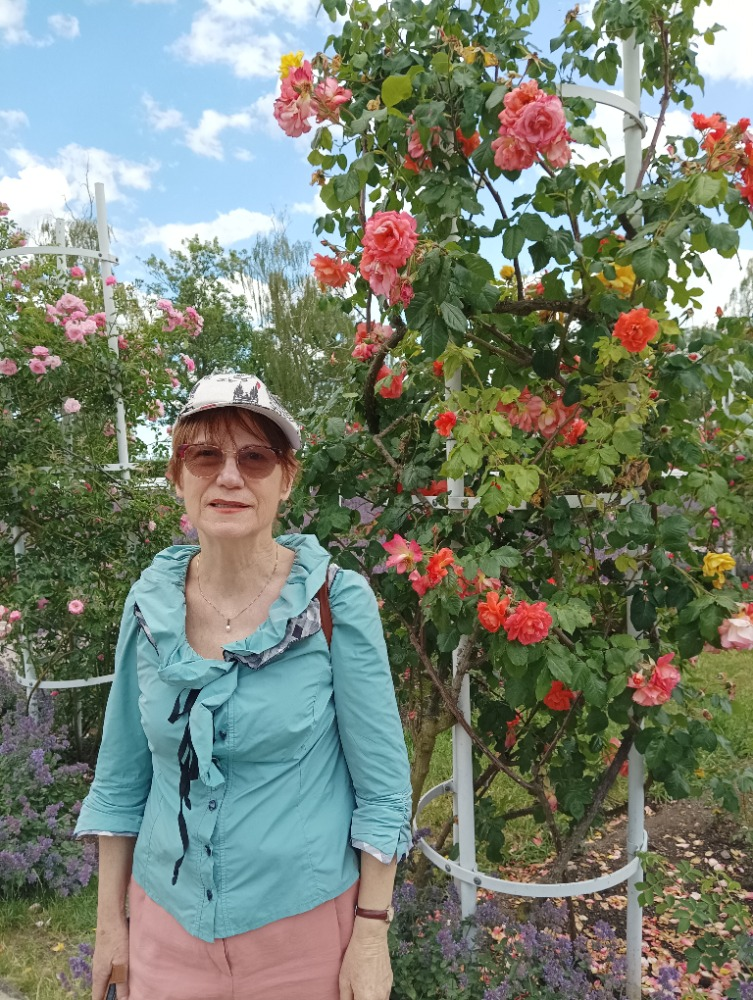
- Ingrid Maier in Prague, 2026

Ingrid Maier (born 19 April 1951) is a German-Swedish philologist, Slavist, and historian. She was employed at Uppsala University from 1991 until her retirement in 2018, first as a lecturer and from 2000 as a professor. Maier is renowned for her critical editions of seventeenth-century Russian news translations, collectively known as Vesti-Kuranty, and for her research on the origins of the Russian court theatre.

== Education and career ==
Maier studied Russian, Polish, German philology and history in Heidelberg, Munich, Uppsala, Konstanz and Moscow. She received her doctorate in Slavic languages at Uppsala University in 1991 and became a full professor there in 2000.

From 1999 to 2017 she co-directed the Vesti-Kuranty publication project, which produced scholarly editions of seventeenth-century Russian translations of Western European news reports. Between 2013 and 2018 she led the research project "Cross-Cultural Communication in Early Modern Russia", funded by Riksbankens Jubileumsfond (The Swedish Foundation for Humanities and Social Sciences).

In 2005–2010 Maier held a research professorship in Slavic studies at the Royal Swedish Academy of Letters, History and Antiquities. She became a member of the Royal Society of Humanities in Uppsala in 2006, and was awarded an honorary doctorate by the Institute of Russian Language of the Russian Academy of Sciences in 2016.

== Research ==
Maier's research focuses on cross-cultural exchanges between Muscovite Russia and Western Europe in the seventeenth century. Her monographs on verbal government in the Vesti-Kuranty (1600-1660) have been described as "a model for further studies" on Russian historical syntax.

Together with Claudia R. Jensen she has published abundantly on the subject of the first Russian court theatre (1672–1676), drawing on previously unknown archival materials. The co-authored monograph Pridvornyj teatr v Rossii XVII veka (Court theatre in Russia during the seventeenth century, 2016) was reviewed by Eliza Małek in Slavia Orientalis. A subsequent English-language expansion of this research, Russia's Theatrical Past (2021), was reviewed by Laurence Senelick in Slavic Review, who noted the authors' use of diplomatic correspondence and travel accounts in reconstructing the development of early Russian theatre. Maria S. Berlova described Russia's Theatrical Past as “an exceptional model” of international scholarly cooperation and noted its use of previously underexplored source materials. She also argued that the monograph contributes to a reassessment of Russia’s theatrical culture before Peter the Great’s reign. Maier’s edition of foreign originals for the Vesti-Kuranty was credited by Helmut Keipert with placing the study of these texts "on a completely new basis". The monograph Cross-Cultural Communication in Early Modern Russia (2023), co-authored with Daniel C. Waugh, was reviewed by Kees Boterbloem in The Historian. Boterbloem described the book as “a towering scholarly achievement” that “adds enormously to our understanding” of Early Modern Russia.

== Selected publications ==
=== Monographs ===
- Verbalrektion in den “Vesti-Kuranty” (1600-1660). Uppsala: Acta Universitatis Upsaliensis. Part 1, 1997; Part 2, 2006.
- Vesti-Kuranty. 1656 g., 1660-1662 gg., 1664-1670 gg. Ch. 2: Inostrannye originaly k russkim tekstam. Moscow: Jazyki slavianskikh kul'tur, 2008.
- with Claudia Jensen: Pridvornyi teatr v Rossii XVII veka. Novye istochniki. Moscow: Indrik, 2016.
- with Claudia Jensen, Stepan Shamin, D. C. Waugh: Russia's Theatrical Past: Court Entertainment in the Seventeenth Century. Bloomington: Indiana University Press, 2021.
- with Daniel C. Waugh: Cross-Cultural Communication in Early Modern Russia: Foreign News in Context. Seattle: ResearchWorks of University of Washington Libraries, 2023, 893 pp. (Open Access). doi:10.6069/XCSQ-BF71

=== Edited volumes ===
- with A. M. Moldovan: Vesti-Kuranty. 1656 g., 1660-1662 gg., 1664-1670 gg. Ch. 1: Russkie teksty. Moscow: Rukopisnye pamiatniki Drevnei Rusi, 2009.
- with V. B. Krys'ko: Vesti-Kuranty. 1671-1672. Moscow: Izdatel′skij centr "Azbukovnik", 2017.
