= Rivi =

Rivi is a surname. Notable people with the surname include:

- Rolando Rivi (1931–1945), Italian Roman Catholic seminarian
- Samuele Rivi (born 1998), Italian racing cyclist

== See also ==
- Revi, another surname
