= Balinese Wikipedia =

Balinese-language edition of Wikipedia

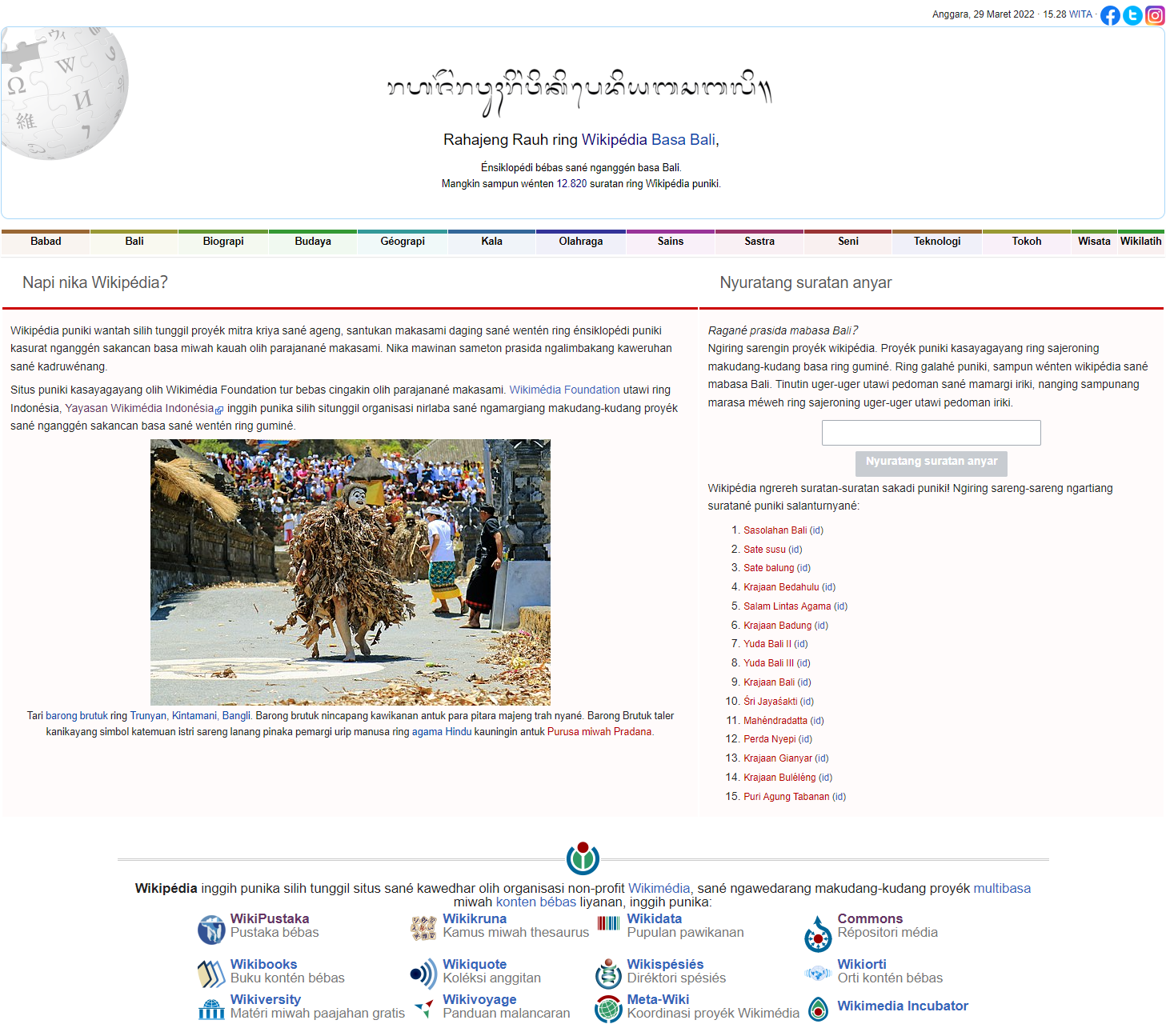
- Screenshot Mainpage of the Balinese Wikipedia
- Website type: Internet encyclopedia project
- Available in: Balinese
- Headquarters: Miami, Florida
- Owner: Wikimedia Foundation
- Website: ban.wikipedia.org
- Commercial: No
- Registration: Optional
- Launched: 14 October 2019; 6 years ago
- Content license: Creative Commons Attribution/ Share-Alike 4.0 (most text also dual-licensed under GFDL); Media licensing varies

Balinese Wikipedia (Balinese: Wikipédia Basa Bali) is the edition of Wikipedia in the Balinese language. The Balinese Wikipedia generally follows the basic rules of Indonesian Wikipedia. The Balinese Wikipedia was in the project incubator Wikimedia, since the incubator page was created in 2005 until October 2019.

There are 38,981 articles in the Balinese Wikipedia. In February 2022, there were 46 active editors who made at least one edit in that month.

== History ==
The Balinese Wikipedia was planned for its birth since 2005. On June 29, 2005, the first proposal received 10 endorsements but none developed. The second proposal, dated 21 November 2006, was submitted with 15 votes in favor of Wikipedian. Unfortunately both proposals were rejected due to a lack of native speakers. Although there are many supporters for the birth of the Balinese Wikipedia, the absence of native speakers of the language itself in the way Wikipedia is created is the main cause of the failure. Since 2006, Wikimedia Foundation has issued a policy that language requests on Wikipedia must be born from a minimum of 5 active contributors from native speakers who will release Wikipedia in a new language. Therefore, no matter how many people support the creation of a new language Wikipedia, without the involvement of native speakers, the results will not be there.

The third proposal was submitted in 2010. Together with the proposal Minangkabau Wikipedia, this proposal became a special discussion at the LangCamp 2012 event at University of Indonesia. At that time, the pages Minangkabau Wikipedia and the Balinese Wikipedia were already under trial at Wikimedia Incubator. Because at that time already had active contributors, the Minangkabau language Wikipedia was launched only two months after the event was held. Unfortunately, once again the hopes that had been fostered in the Balinese Wikipedia had to be dashed. However, the proposal for the third Balinese Wikipedia was not rejected, but was left open until there were native speakers who were really ready to work on it.

From 2012 to 2018, little effort was made on the Balinese Wikipedia in the Incubator. In the second half of 2017, the Balinese Wikipedia was briefly introduced in the Indonesian Wikipedia training in Singaraja. The same thing was also done in Denpasar in July 2018. The results were nil.

In early 2018, Project Ganesha which was held by Wikimedia Indonesia announced I Wayan Nadiantara as the first winner. Nadi as a Balinese speaker was then introduced by Wikimedia Indonesia staff to the Balinese Wikipedia at the Incubator. The Balinese Wikipedia vacuum period since 2012 ended when Nadi began actively editing there in August 2018. Because it was impossible for the Balinese Wikipedia to be done alone, Nadi was introduced to Yosef Agus Haryanto, an active contributor to the Indonesian Wikipedia who lives in Bali. Agus Haryanto himself only found out about the Balinese Wikipedia when he was involved in the Indonesian Wikipedia training in July 2018. Nadi also became acquainted with the pioneer of the Balinese Wikipedia Instagram account, Thanasis Soultatis, who was originally a Yogyakarta Wikipedian, but now lives in Denpasar. In addition, a lecturer at the Faculty of Balinese Literature at Udayana University named I Gede Gita Purnama was introduced to Nadi because of his interest in the plan to develop a Balinese Wikipedia after being invited by a friend Sundanese Wikipedia named Ilham Nurwansah.

On 5 April 2019, the first ground coffee was finally held by bringing the four people together. The ground coffee discussed the first Balinese Wikipedia training for the public. The training was then held the next day at DILo Denpasar with 18 participants who were professionals and students in the field of Balinese language. From the training, three Udayana University students were able to show their resilience in writing on the Balinese Wikipedia. Ni Kadek Ayu Sulastri, Siti Noviali, and Luh Gede Krismayanti became excellent seeds from the results of the training.

Since the first training, three more Balinese Wikipedia trainings have been held in Denpasar. The Denpasar Wikimedia community was formed in August 2019 and chaired by Ayu Sulastri. Although not many trainees can endure editing on the Balinese Wikipedia in the Incubator, community members with more than 5 people can consistently edit. It is able to meet the requirements specified by the Wikimedia Foundation. One of the conditions for launching a new Wikipedia is that there are at least 5 volunteers who edit at least 10 times a month and must be consistent for at least 3–5 months.

On 7 October 2019, Jon Harald Søby, member of the Language Committee at the Wikimedia Foundation proposed the launch of the Balinese Wikipedia with the address ban.wikipedia.org. The name 'ban' is the ISO 639 code for Balinese. The process of migrating pages from Wikimedia Incubator to the new address took one day to finish on 14 October. On that date, the Balinese Wikipedia officially became part of the worldwide Wikipedia family, which was available in 304 languages at the time.

=== Approved as Wikipedia ===
As of October 2019, the number of articles on the Balinese language incubator page reached more than 1,400 articles written by its contributors. Previously, on 10 October, the request to redirect the incubator page to the Balinese Wikipedia was approved by the Wikimedia Foundation admin after verification with Balinese linguists was completed via the translatewiki site.

On 14 October 2019, Indonesian time, or 15 October 2019 for the Wikimedia Foundation admin server, the Balinese Wikipedia was released and accessed online.

=== Milestones ===
- 1 article: November 2006, created main page.
- 100 articles: April 2019, approximately.
- 1400 articles: October 2019
- 8000 articles: 22 June 2021
- 10.000 articles: 24 October 2021
- 15.000 articles: 13 August 2022
- 38,981 articles up until today.

== Users and editors ==
Balinese Wikipedia statistics
Number of user accounts	Number of articles	Number of files	Number of administrators
111653	38981	135	4

== Related Wikipedias ==
These are Wikipedias written in local Indonesian languages.

- Indonesian Wikipedia (id:)
- Acehnese Wikipedia (ace:)
- Banyumasan Wikipedia (map-bms:)
- Buginese Wikipedia (bug:)
- Javanese Wikipedia (jv:)
- Madurese Wikipedia (mad:)
- Malay Wikipedia (ms:)
- Minangkabau Wikipedia (min:)
- Nias Wikipedia (nia:)
- Sundanese Wikipedia (su:)
- Gorontalo Wikipedia (gor:)
