= Indonesian Wikipedia =

Indonesian edition of Wikipedia

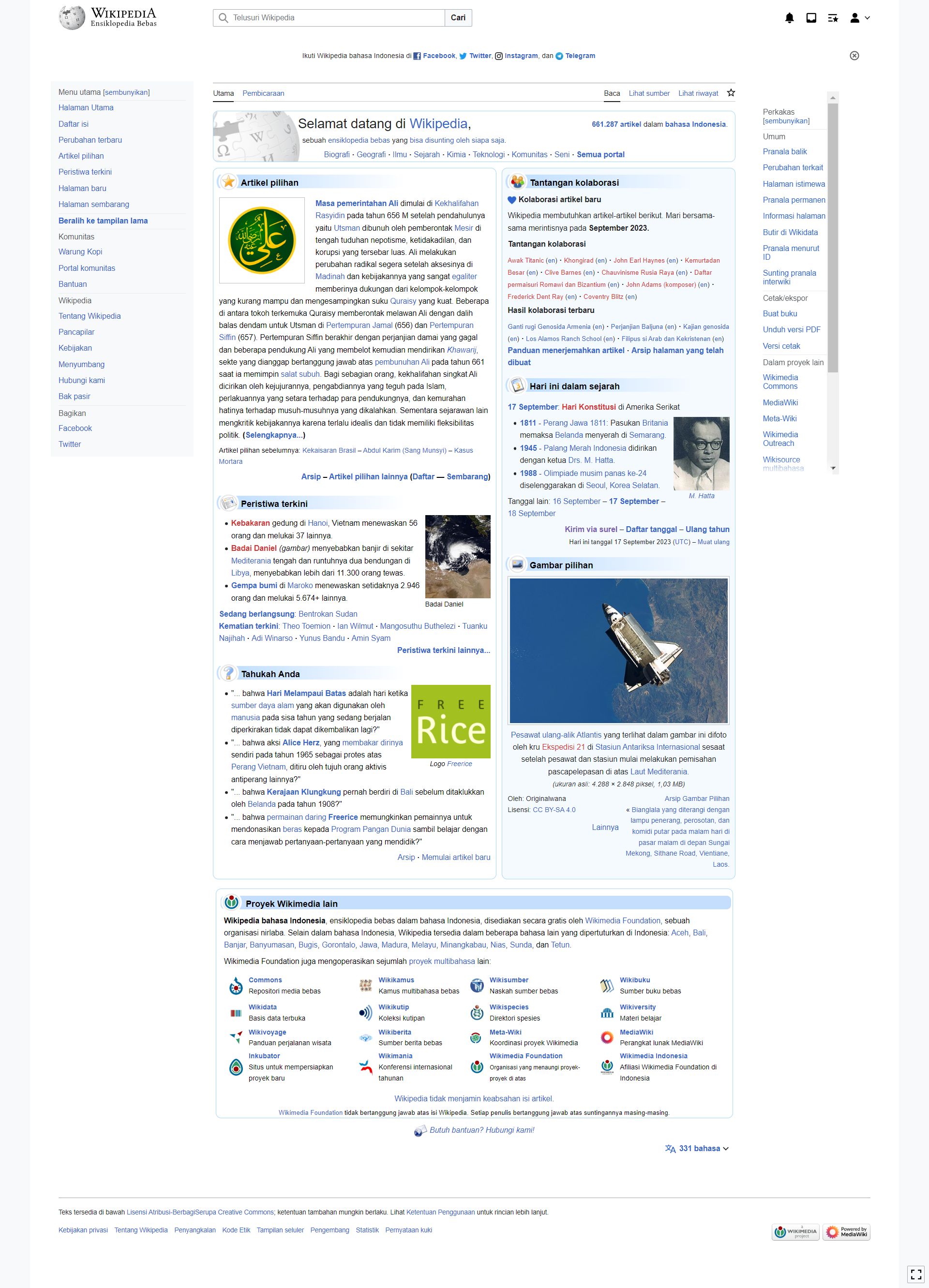
- Screenshot Mainpage of the Indonesian Wikipedia
- Website type: Internet encyclopedia project
- Available in: Indonesian
- Headquarters: Miami, Florida, U.S. Jakarta, Indonesia
- Owner: Wikimedia Foundation
- Website: id.wikipedia.org
- Commercial: No
- Registration: Optional
- Users: 1.76 million (as of 13 November 2026)
- Launched: 30 May 2003; 23 years ago
- Content license: Creative Commons Attribution/ Share-Alike 4.0 (most text also dual-licensed under GFDL); Media licensing varies

The Indonesian Wikipedia (Indonesian: Wikipedia bahasa Indonesia, WBI for short) is the Indonesian-language edition of Wikipedia. It ranks 23rd in terms of depth among Wikipedias. Its first article was written on 30 May 2003, yet its main page was created six months later, on 29 November 2003.

There are 804,430 articles in the Indonesian Wikipedia. In April 2016, there were 462 editors who made at least five edits in that month.

== Background ==
Historical screenshots of Indonesian Wikipedia

Main page, 9 December 2005

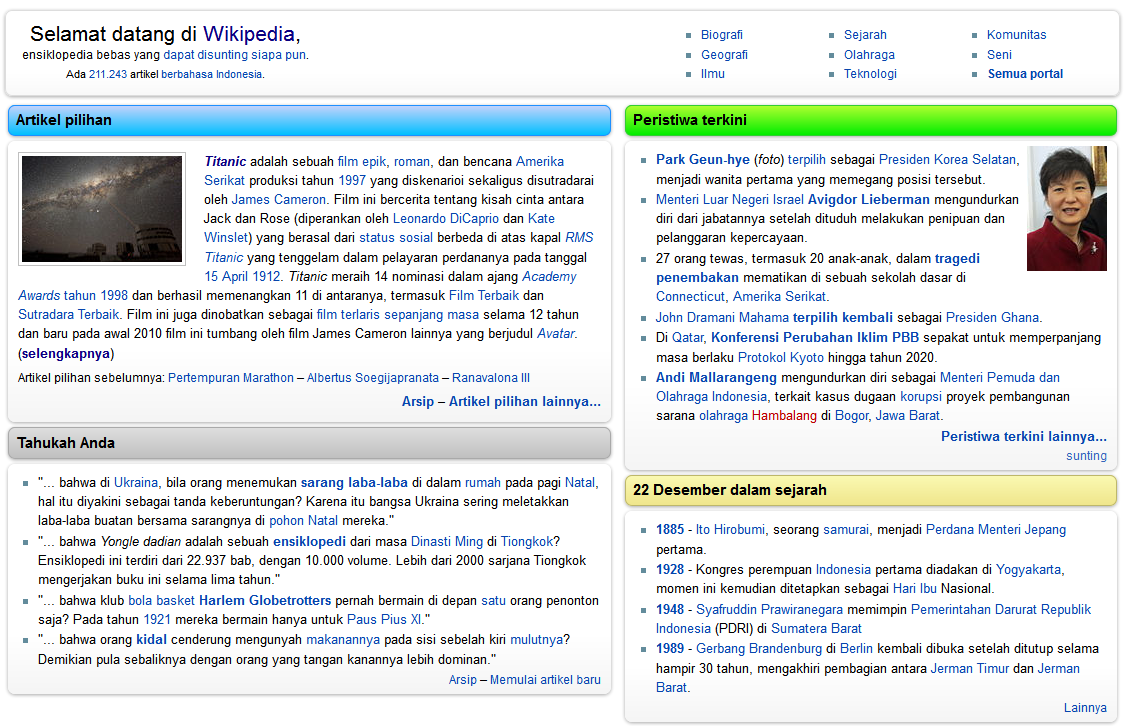
Main page, 22 December 2012

Message shown on the wiki's 16th year anniversary. (30 May 2019)

An appearance of an article shown at 25th anniversary of English Wikipedia. (6 April 2026)

Although the Indonesian language is similar to the Malay language, the Indonesian Wikipedia remains separate from the Malay Wikipedia (initiated in October 2002) because they were started separately by two different user groups within six months of each other. In 2009, Andrew Lih wrote "Because these groups are drawn on national boundaries, merging is not likely to happen soon."

Indonesian is a normative form of the Malay language, an Austronesian (or Malayo-Polynesian) language which had been used as a lingua franca in the Indonesian archipelago for centuries, and was elevated to the status of an official language with the Indonesian Declaration of Independence in 1945, drawing inspiration from the Sumpah Pemuda (Youth Pledge) event in 1928. Although it is very similar to the official Malaysian form of the language, it does differ from the Malaysian form in some ways, with key differences in pronunciation and vocabulary, due in large part to the many Dutch words in the Indonesian vocabulary. It is spoken as a mother tongue by only about 7% of the population in Indonesia, but altogether more than 200 million people speak it. The Malay language is spoken by ethnic groups who reside in the Malay Peninsula, southern Thailand, parts of the Philippines, and Singapore. Malay is also considered one of the dialects of the Indonesian language by Indonesians living in central eastern Sumatra, the Riau Islands and parts of the coast of Borneo.

== Contributors ==
In 2004, Tempo magazine published a feature about the Indonesian Wikipedia, in which Revo Soekatno, one of its best known contributors, described it as the "Encyclopedia from the boarding houses", meaning an encyclopedia that was produced by Indonesians living and studying overseas. The article contributed to the popularization of Wikipedia in the archipelago. Since then, the Indonesian Wikipedia has seen its number of users rise remarkably.

In 2006, following Time featuring "You" as its person of the year, Kompas published a feature article on Revo where he was called the "Father of Wikipedia in Indonesian". The article highlighted the spirit of participation as the type of "addiction to the cyberspace that needed to be endorsed". Other Indonesian publications followed suit to refer to Revo Soekatno as an "activist that built a community portal in Indonesia" praising his contributions to the presence of Indonesia in the Internet.

In February 2009, the Indonesian Wikipedia achieved the milestone of 100,000 articles. One of the contributors mentioned in the article was the user borgx, who made 80,000 edits starting in 2005. That year, the Indonesian Wikipedia only had about fifty active contributors.

=== Workshop and seminars ===
In March 2007, Bina Nusantara University invited Indonesian Wikipedians to speak at the first Wikipedia seminar for the public and to introduce Wikipedia Bahasa Indonesia and Wikimedia Foundation projects at its campus in Jakarta.

In November 2007, the Indonesian government, through its Department of Communication and Information, decided to establish an annual Indonesian ICT Award and invited the Indonesian Wikipedia community to hold a workshop on how to write Wikipedia articles. Ivan Lanin, one of the speakers interviewed by Antara, stated that the number of contributors to the Indonesian Wikipedia was rising, and the articles were beginning to become more diverse. According to Revo's speech, the challenge for the Indonesian Wikipedia in the future was to gain credibility and give the public assurance about the quality of the content provided.

At the first day, the workshop was attended by 40 people, although the number of computers provided for hands-on practice was considerably less than the number of participants.

The following year, at the 2008 Indonesian ICT Awards, the Indonesian Wikipedia community held separate workshop sessions for the public and for organizations.

=== Partnership with Google ===
On 4 December 2018, Google announced a partnership with Wikipedia in order to translate relevant Wikipedia's articles from English to Bahasa Indonesia language through their AI-powered Google Neural Machine Translation.

== Physical releases ==
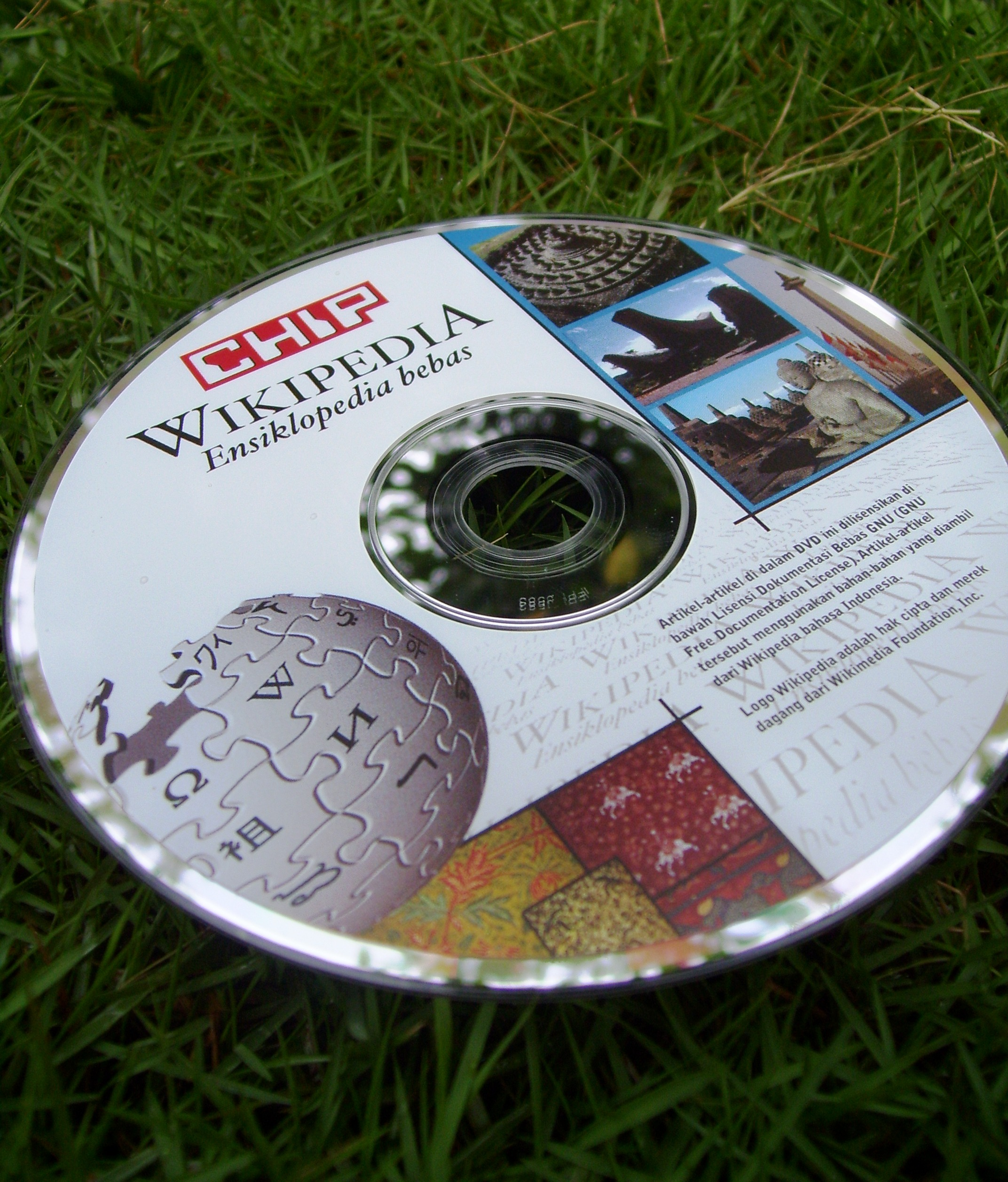
Indonesian Wikipedia Complimentary DVD distributed by Chip magazine on their August 2008 edition

In August 2008, the Indonesian version of CHIP magazine distributed a complimentary DVD containing more than 80,000 articles (without images) with its 11th anniversary edition. This edition also featured a three-page Wikipedia article titled "Wikipedia: When one thousand brains are better than one". The article provided an extensive history of Wikipedia, including the Indonesian Wikipedia, as well as a description of the Wikimedia Indonesia chapter, which was in preparation at that time.

However, a DVD version of the Indonesian Wikipedia with photos was already in existence since April 2008 and could be purchased online from an independent vendor for 20 thousand rupiah, around US$2.

== Controversies ==
=== Inclusion of the 1965-1966 mass killings and the communist party of Indonesia ===
On 3 June 2020, #BoikotWikipedia (#BoycottWikipedia) became trending on Twitter, now known as X, due to Tengku Zulkarnain, an ustaz and committee member of Indonesian Ulema Council at the time, complaining about Wikipedia's article on the 1965-66 mass killings and the Communist Party of Indonesia (PKI). Zulkarnain pressured the chief of the Indonesian National Police Idham Azis and President Joko Widodo to take action and arrest the author. Some things, like Suharto's photo and mentions of the PKI were later removed from the article.

The Crescent Star Party's leader urged Wikipedia to remove that edit forever, also claiming that the PKI is the sole writer. An expert on communism called the article "brainwashing". The Indonesian Democratic Party of Struggle states that it is a "reflection of the country's war on history".

The Wikimedia Foundation of Indonesia states that they are "neutral and unpaid for any articles made in its site." It also acknowledged that many of its articles were mainly translated from the English Wikipedia.

=== 2026 Indonesian government blocking ===
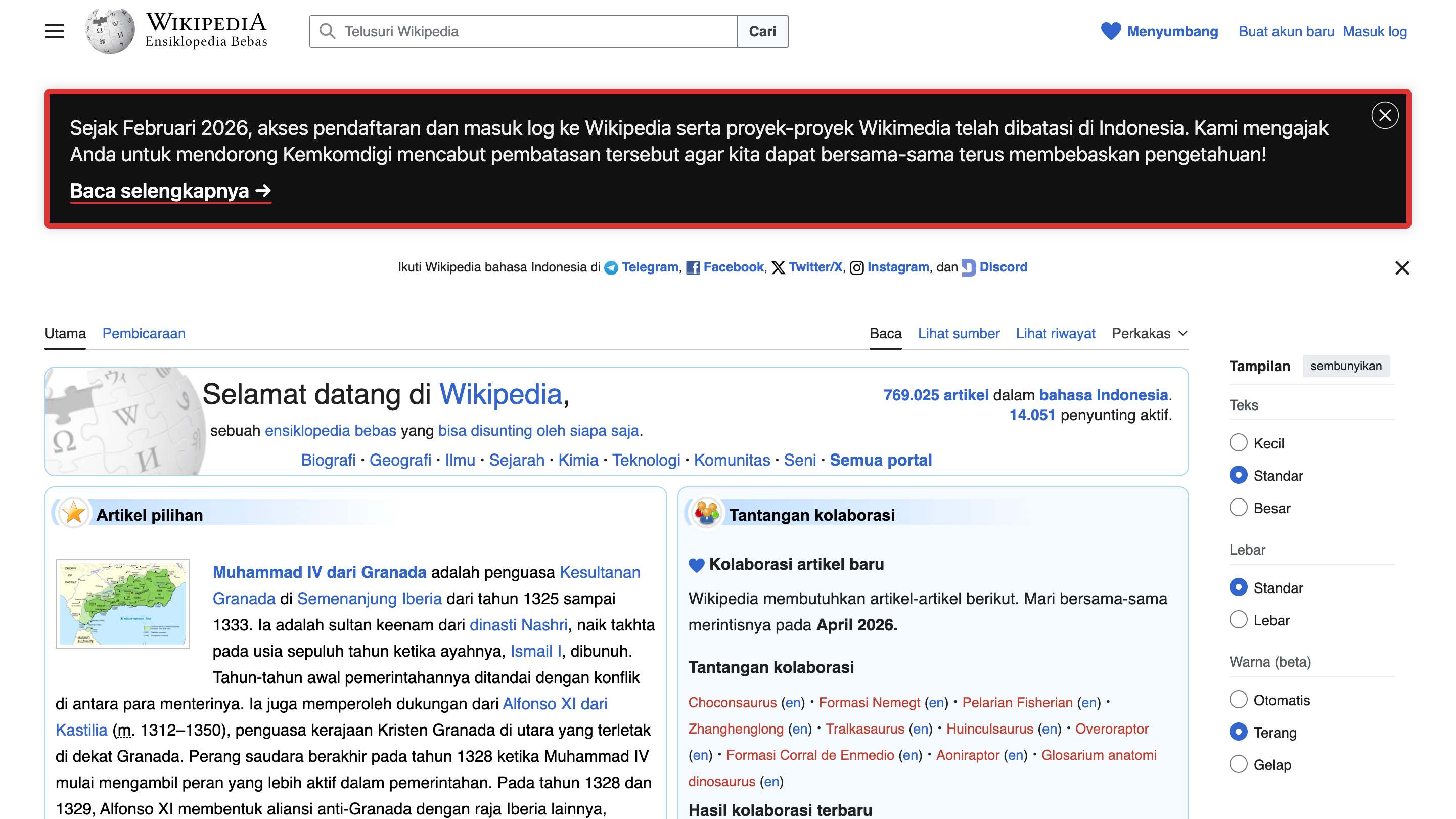
Main Page of the Indonesian Wikipedia on 14 April 2026, showing a banner protesting the blocking

On 25 February 2026, the Indonesian Ministry of Communication and Digital Affairs blocked access to the domain auth.wikimedia.org that prevented user login, calling it a "restriction". It was done because the Wikimedia Foundation had not registered itself as an Electronic System Organizer (PSE) of Private Sector per the Regulation of the Minister of Communication and Informatics No. 5 of 2020. The ministry's Director General of Digital Space Supervision Alexander Sabar said notification of the registration requirement had been sent since November 2025 and, according to him, had even been extended twice until January 2026. Alexander claimed that Wikipedia had not responded to anything regarding the registration. Wikimedia Indonesia (WMID) immediately responded by processing the registration. On 25 March 2026, before WMID completed the registration, the ministry also blocked Wikimedia Commons for the same reason, before it was restored shortly.

The blocking of Indonesian Wikipedia was strongly criticized by 83 civil society organizations that later joined the so-called "Peace Coalition" (Koalisi Damai). The group stated that blocking Wikipedia has the potential to harm the public interest and hinder positive contributions. The coalition also stated that blocking Wikipedia is a form of "digital authoritarianism" and evidence of problems with the proportionality of Indonesia's digital policy. The coalition urged the revocation of Ministerial Regulation No. 5 of 2020 and Ministerial Regulation No. 10 of 2021, which they said were tools of censorship and "surveillance that violates privacy and human rights". The blocking of Wikimedia Commons itself also received much criticism, regretting that Wikimedia was blocked while many online gambling sites were left unchecked. Wikipedians also considered this blocking to hinder the spread of "free knowledge".

== Milestones ==
- 1,000 articles: 16 March 2004
- 10,000 articles: 31 May 2005
- 50,000 articles: 1 February 2007
- 100,000 articles: 21 February 2009
- 180,000 articles: 26 December 2011
- 200,000 articles: 27 March 2012
- 300,000 articles: Oct 2013
- 400,000 articles: 27 April 2017
- 500,000 articles: 15 August 2019
- 600,000 articles: 18 October 2021
- 700,000 articles: 2 August 2024

== Users and editors ==
Indonesian Wikipedia statistics
Number of user accounts	Number of articles	Number of files	Number of administrators
1762766	804430	68210	47

== Related Wikipedias ==
These are Wikipedias written in local Indonesian languages.

- Acehnese Wikipedia (ace:)
- Balinese Wikipedia (ban:)
- Banjarese Wikipedia (bjn:)
- Banyumasan Wikipedia (map-bms:)
- Betawi Wikipedia (bew:)
- Buginese Wikipedia (bug:)
- Batak Toba Wikipedia (bbc:)
- Batak Mandailing Wikipedia (btm:)
- Gorontalo Wikipedia (gor:)
- Javanese Wikipedia (jv:)
- Komering Wikipedia (kge:)
- Madurese Wikipedia (mad:)
- Malay Wikipedia (ms:)
- Minangkabau Wikipedia (min:)
- Nias Wikipedia (nia:)
- Sundanese Wikipedia (su:)

== See also ==
- Indonesian Wikipedia: Announcements - a more extensive, more complete table of data on the growing number of articles in Indonesian Wikipedia. (in Indonesian)
- Indonesian Wikipedia: Statistics - various statistics reflecting the growth of Indonesian Wikipedia. (in Indonesian)
- Proposed merger of Indonesian Wikipedia and Malay Wikipedia (in Indonesian)
- ms:Wikipedia:Proposal to unify - a proposal to unify in Malay Wikipedia. (in Indonesian)
- Revo Arka Giri Soekatno, the first contributor to Indonesian Wikipedia
