= Papat Limpad =

7 month writing competition in Javanese Wikipedia

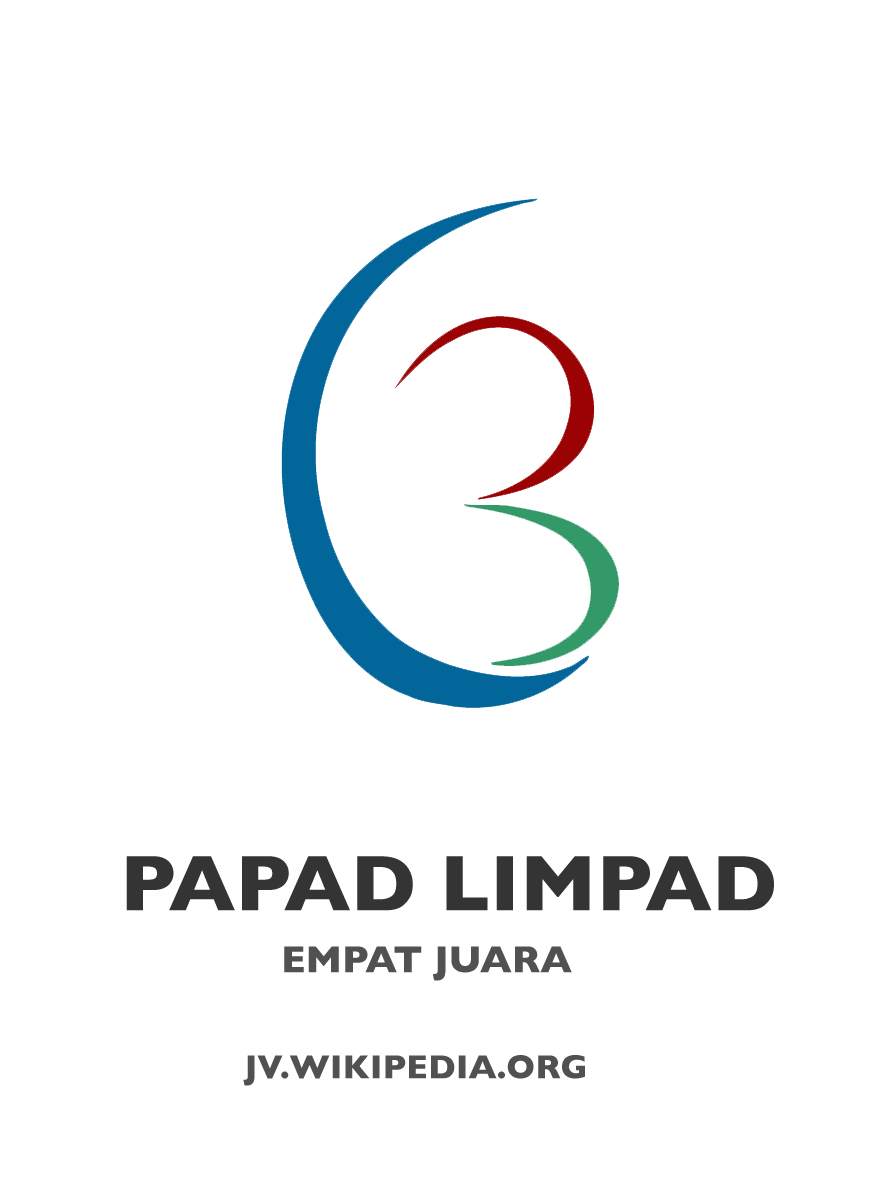
Four Champions Javanese Language Wikipedia Competition

Papat Limpad (English: Four Champions) was a seven-month long writing competition in the Javanese-language Wikipedia. The purpose of this competition was to revitalize the "barely alive" Javanese-language Wikipedia. Javanese Wikipedia started in January 2003, began to have a larger number of regular contributors in mid-2006, and began to see its golden era for seven years in 2008. However, the activity decreased and returned to 2006 status, with only 2 to 1 regular contributors for the last two years. The Javanese language Wikipedia ranked 71 in the number of pages being viewed by 1.2 million viewers a month (before intervention). Wikimedia Indonesia believes that Javanese Wikipedia has an untapped potential growth and an untapped potential editor base that needs to be reached.

== Proposed solution ==
In December 2010, Javanese Language Wikipedia sysop and co-founder of Wikimedia Indonesia proposed to use one potential University in Semarang, Central Java Universitas Negeri Semarang (Public University Semarang) also known as UNNES, as location and resources of this pilot project. UNNES met the rationale that Semarang is a location where Javanese Language population reside, and the university also have a Javanese Language major specific. The success of Free Your Knowledge 2010 competition in Indonesian language Wikipedia are hoped to be replicate in Javanese Language Wikipedia. However, lesson learn from the competition proves that after 72 days of competition, none of the participant return to edit further - this result is not acceptable in Javanese Language Wikipedia, considering the high cost where the trainee need to be flown regularly from Jakarta to Semarang. Therefore, it is decided to have a seven months competition to compensate the cost.

== Project Goal ==
=== Impact ===
The impact of the project on WMF mission goals of Increased Reach, Increased Quality, Increased Credibility, Increased and Diversified Participation is shown by the increasing very active Wikipedian as illustrated in the statistics.

=== Planned goal ===
The Javanese language revitalization project has a simple goal: sustainable growth for six months in 2011, with a minimum of six active users and outreach in Javanese language population city.

=== Result ===
1. Papat Limpad has successfully increased Javanese Language Wikipedia very active users (>100 edits/ month) from two contributors (average) in 2010 to 13 contributors during seven months competition.
2. Papat Limpad has successfully increased Javanese Language Wikipedia active users (>5 edits/ months) from nine contributors (average) in 2010 to 44 contributors during seven months competition.
3. The participant (both that finishes and dropped out from the competition) contributed more than 2,269 short and long articles using Wikimedia Indonesia competition standard within 7 months competition.
4. Posters of article results by top five participants are spread in three different universities in Semarang, increasing the awareness of Javanese Language Wikipedia existence.
5. The Javanese Wikipedia readership climbed to 2.5 million readers in October 2011, and dropped back to 1.6 million in April 2012, a level similar to that of the situation before intervention happened. Compared to Indonesian Wikipedia, where each intervention increased the readership (by/to?) 10 million and the number had the tendency to stay, until the next intervention, in a small-language Wikipedia such as Javanese Wikipedia, the readership rate dropped quickly when the number of contributors dropped.

== 2010s ==
=== 2011 ===
In January 2011 Wikimedia Indonesia's Papat Limpad team begin the trip from Jakarta to Semarang to introduce the initiative "Papat Limpad". Papat Limpad is an intervention project to Javanese Language Wikipedia natural declining stage by introducing a competition system in writing for Javanese Language Wikipedia to UNNES, using the same competing system in Indonesian Language Wikipedia known as Free Your Knowledge System (FYKS).

As incentive to 100 students that will compete writing in Javanese language Wikipedia for seven months, four laptops will be given to top writer contributors, while one laptop will be given to the head of Javanese Language Academy Major.

In February 2011, Wikimedia Indonesia began an intensive training to Semarang committee, the training include project management, competition monitoring, documentation, and reporting. Five people are selected with task distribution of coordinator and member of the committee.

After one month committee training, the competition began on March 21, 2011, and ended on October 13, 2011. Exactly during the celebration of "Language Month" (October).

=== 2012 ===
Papat Limpad 2012 (English: Four Champions) was conducted in 2012–2013. Wikimedia Indonesia designed a combined systematic effort to do outreach with writing classes and writing drives in the form of competition in Javanese-language Wikipedia. The project expands to three cities and approaches six universities to join the competition. The writing classes are expected to net a group of much more experienced and smarter new editors to compete against each other, and will benefit Javanese-language Wikipedia by increasing the number of new editors and the number of high-quality Javanese-language encyclopedia articles. The intervention is aimed at increasing the number of Javanese Wikipedia contributors up to a critical mass where the community could sustain itself and grow. Wikimedia Indonesia believes critical mass is reached when it is sustained at a minimum of 20 very active contributors without competition.

Wikimedia Indonesia prioritized Javanese Wikipedia intervention and put most of its resources to do this one program, making sure it is up and running. Wikimedia Indonesia figures that a minimum of three interventions in three years will do the trick, before helping Wikipedia versions in other languages of Indonesia. This project is co-funded by Wikimedia Indonesia, and Wikimédia France and Switzerland Wikimedia.

== See also ==
- Javanese language
- Javanese Wikipedia
