= Revi =

Revi is a surname and a rare given name used for both males and females.

== Usage ==
In the Netherlands Revi is given mainly to boys but also to girls, while in the United States every recorded instance of the name in Social Security Administration data is female. As of January 2026, it also appeared in official data as a rare first given name among men in Poland and women in Denmark.

== Surname ==
- Alfred Revi, Austrian field hockey player
- Juan Revi (born 1986), Indonesian football player

== Given name ==
- Revi Karunakaran
- Revi Soekatno
- Vineeth Revi Mathew (born 1984), Indian basketball player
- Revi Mariska (born 1986), Indonesian actress
