= Revo Soekatno =

Indonesian Wikipedia pioneer (born 1975)

Revo Arka Giri Soekatno
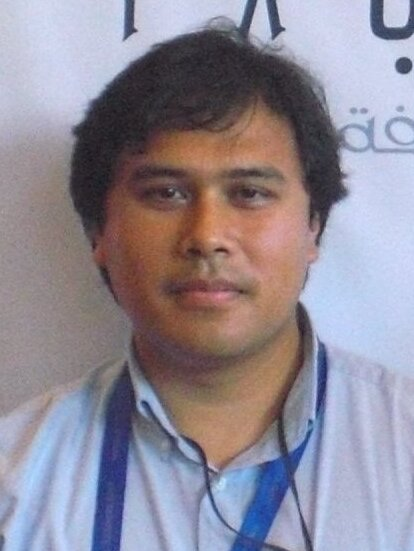
- Revo in 2008
- Born: Revo Arka Giri Soekatno; 2 August 1975 (age 51); Ambon, Maluku, Indonesia
- Other names: Revo Soekatno; Revi Soekatno
- Education: Erasmus University Rotterdam; Universiteit Leiden
- Occupations: Lecturer, entrepreneur, writer
- Website: Soekatno Facebook page

Revo Arka Giri Soekatno (born 2 August 1975), known online as Meursault2004, is an Indonesian researcher, entrepreneur, and Wikipedia enthusiast.

Revo received recognition in the media as one of the Indonesian Wikipedia pioneers as his profile was published in nationally circulated newspaper Kompas on 26 December 2006 following Time's article person of the year "You" (2006). Previously in 2004, Tempo had printed a story about Wikipedia as "encyclopedia that came from a boarding house", where Revo became the source person for the story, representing the Indonesian Wikipedia. His contributions at the time was recorded to be over a thousand new articles. On 2006, it rose to 6,500 new articles.

== Education ==
Born in Ambon, Maluku, Indonesia, Revo's parents were native Javanese from Surakarta, in Central Java. Revo has been moving from town to town in Indonesia and abroad following his father's assignment. He speaks Dutch, German, English, Indonesian, and Javanese. Since junior high school (1986), he has lived and studied in the Netherlands where he pursued his doctorate degree in old Javanese literature at the University of Leiden (2006).

== Wikipedia ==
His first encounter with Indonesian Wikipedia was in 2003, when he found the site and described it as "ugly" and had a "lack of information".

Revo soon found out that the website can be edited and has been contributing since. In 2004 Revo became the resource person and actively advocated in Indonesian media about Wikipedia in general or Indonesian Wikipedia in particular. In a Tempo article, he stated that although everyone can contribute anything, Wikipedia is still trying to be a serious encyclopedia, vandalism usually does not last long since it can be corrected by anyone. During his brief return to Indonesia on 2007, he was interviewed by women's magazine Chic, (Note: Published 2004–2014, by Indonesian: Gramedia Majalah publishers, now called Grid Network publishing.) where he encouraged more women to write for Wikipedia. (Note: Link to picture of Revo for "Figure" article in Chic magazine February–March 2007 issue.) Revo featured on Metro TV as an active contributor to the Indonesian Wikipedia.

He became a speaker in Wikipedia seminars, one of them was sponsored by the Indonesian Ministry of Communication and Information during ICT Award 2007, where interested participants received an "on hand training" on how to edit and write in Wikipedia. During an interview with Indonesia's news agency Antara, Revo stated that the challenge for the Indonesian Wikipedia in the future will be to maintain its information accuracy. In 2006 Indonesian Wikipedia had become Asia's third fastest-growing of local version after Japan and China. As of 13 May 2022, he is a bureaucrat in the Indonesian Wikipedia and has made 46,543 edits.

== See also ==
- List of Wikipedia people
