= Alexander Sabar =

Indonesian police officer

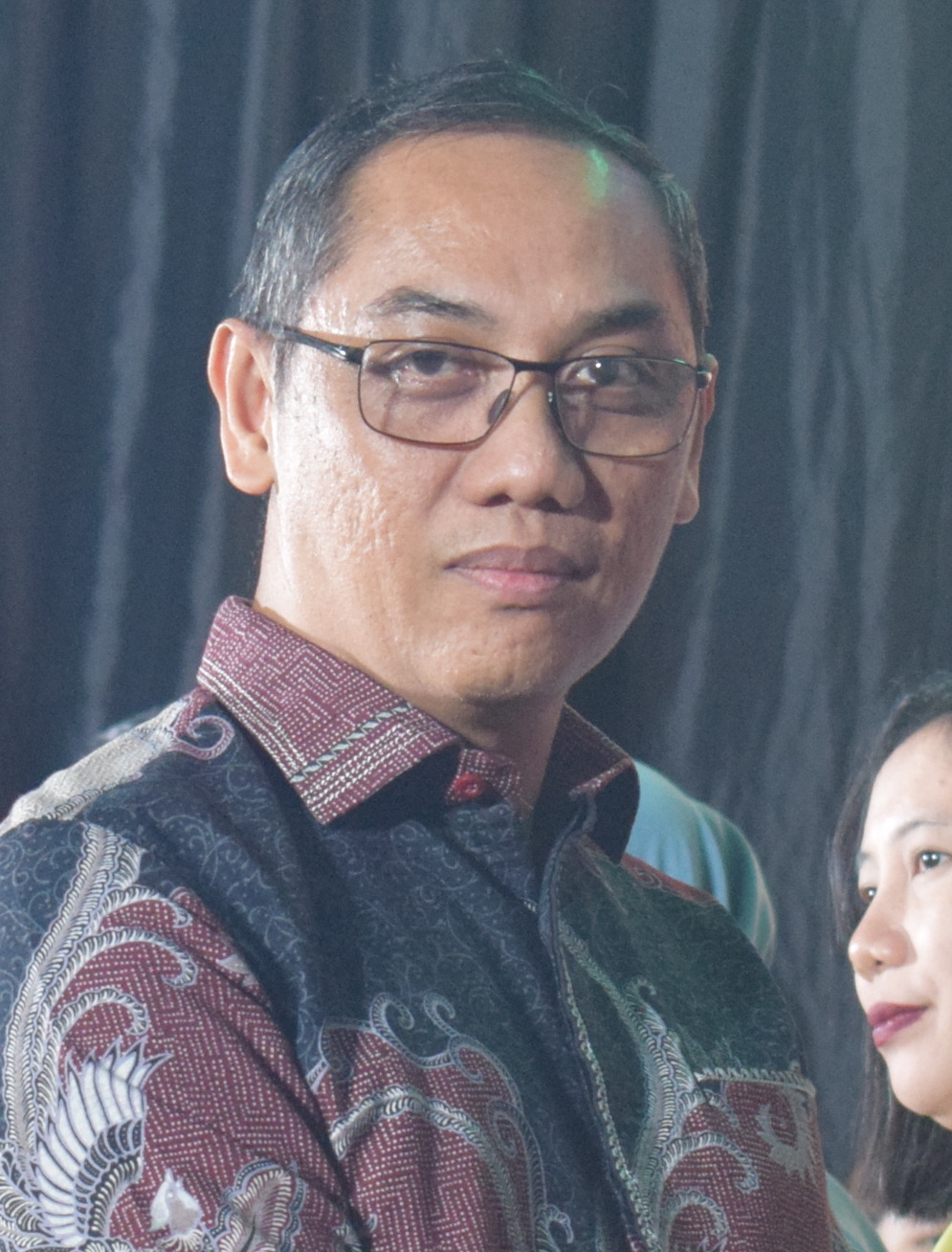
- Sabar in 2025

Director General of Digital Space Supervision
- In office 18 November 2024 (Note: Acting until 13 January 2025) – October 2026
- Preceded by: Office established

Personal details
- Born: September 7, 1974 (age 52)
- Education: Police Science College (S.I.K.); Jayabaya University (M.H.); University of Indonesia (Dr.)

Military service
- Allegiance: Indonesia
- Branch/service: Indonesian National Police
- Years of service: 1996–present
- Rank: Inspector general
- Unit: Detachment 88

Alexander Sabar (born 7 September 1974) is an Indonesian police officer who served as the Director General of Digital Space Supervision of the Ministry of Communication and Digital Affairs from 18 November 2024 to October 2026. A 1996 police academy graduate, Sabar served in the police's counterterrorism unit, the Detachment 88, before being transferred to the National Narcotics Board and the National Counter Terrorism Agency.

== Education ==
Born on 7 September 1974, Alexander originated from Makassar and completed his secondary education at the 5th Makassar High School in 1993. Alexander Sabar is a 1996 graduate of the Indonesian Police Academy and pursued bachelor's degree in policing sciences at the Police Science College (Perguruan Tinggi Ilmu Kepolisian, PTIK) from 2002 to 2004. He received his master's degree in law from the Jayabaya University before pursuing doctorate studies in criminology at the University of Indonesia in 2020 after being asked to teach on terrorism and cyber topics at the Police Science College. During his doctorate studies, he developed E-Vicpro, a digital application to formulate compensation calculations for crime victims.

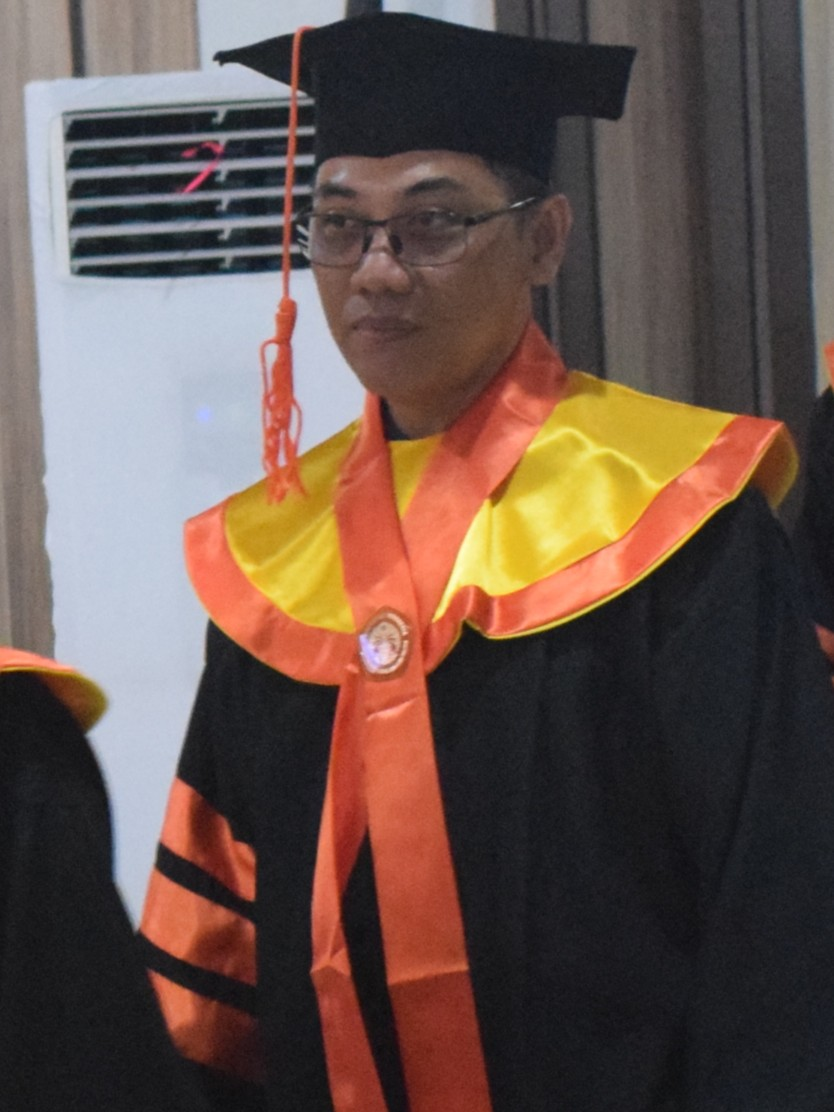
Sabar at his doctorate graduation ceremony.

According to Sabar, his thesis advisor Adrianus Meliala kept pressing him to complete his studies, to the point where he was more scared facing his thesis defense than terrorists. He successfully defended his dissertation, titled Hyperreality and Simulacrum in Cyber Terrorism Propaganda in Indonesia, with a "very satisfactory" distinction. At his thesis defense, the chief examiner Dody Prayogo jokingly commended his efforts by stating that he would have obtained the cum laude distinction had he not taken five years to graduate. His thesis defense was attended by prominent police figures, including chief of the National Narcotics Board Marthinus Hukom and former chiefs of the National Counter Terrorism Agency Eddy Hartono and Rycko Amelza Dahniel.

Aside from his formal education, Sabar also completed several short-term and non-degree education. He received specialized training from Interpol, such as Computer Investigation and Forensics and The 2nd Interpol Train the Trainer Workshop on Computer Forensics for Asia and South Pacific, as well as Virtual Forensic Computing (VFC) Method Training from the Cyber Crimes Investigation Center and Computer Investigation and Forensic Training from the International Criminal Investigative Training Assistance.

== Career ==
Sabar has spent most of his career in matters relating to cybercrime and counter-terrorism. His work in this field began in 2006 as a primary investigator in the Cyber Crime Unit at the Criminal Investigation Agency of the National Police. By 2020, he reached the rank of police grand commissioner, and served as a mid-level analyst for intelligence affairs within the Detachment 88. On 16 November 2020, the national police chief reassigned him to the National Counter Terrorism Agency to serve as the deputy director (chief of subdirectorate) for intelligence.

On 23 December 2022, Sabar was appointed through a telegram by the national police chief as the chief of operations assistance in Detachment 88. He was installed as the director of narcotics under the National Narcotics Board's deputy for eradication on 19 October 2023 before being promoted to the rank of police brigadier general on 17 November. He was administratively reassigned to the institution on 8 December before being rotated to serve as intelligence director under the same deputy on 1 February 2024.

Sabar became the acting director general of digital space supervision within the ministry of communication and digital affairs on 18 November 2024. He was appointed to address complex digital threats, notably online gambling, as part of a ministerial "clean-up". He was permanently appointed to the position on 13 January 2025 and was promoted to the rank of police inspector general on 14 February 2025. Sabar's appointment drew criticism due to his police background, signaling a "security approach" to digital governance. Indonesia's Internet watchdog, SAFEnet, warned the appointment could create "conflicts of interest" and lead to an excessive security approach that would "curtail freedom of expression," given the police's history of using the Electronic Information and Transaction (ITE) law to silence critics.

The newly established directorate general Sabar elevated the control functions of the less powerful informatics application control directorate, which existed in the previous ministry of communications and information. Under the ministry regulation that established the directorate general, the agency was tasked with handling suspected digital crimes under the 2024 ITE Law and overseeing platforms and internet users.

Shortly upon his appointment, Sabar announced that he would focus on coordinating and consolidating the agency's internal affairs. On 22 January 2025 Sabar requested 706 billion rupiahs, on top of the allocated 172 billion rupiah, to optimize the work of his agency.

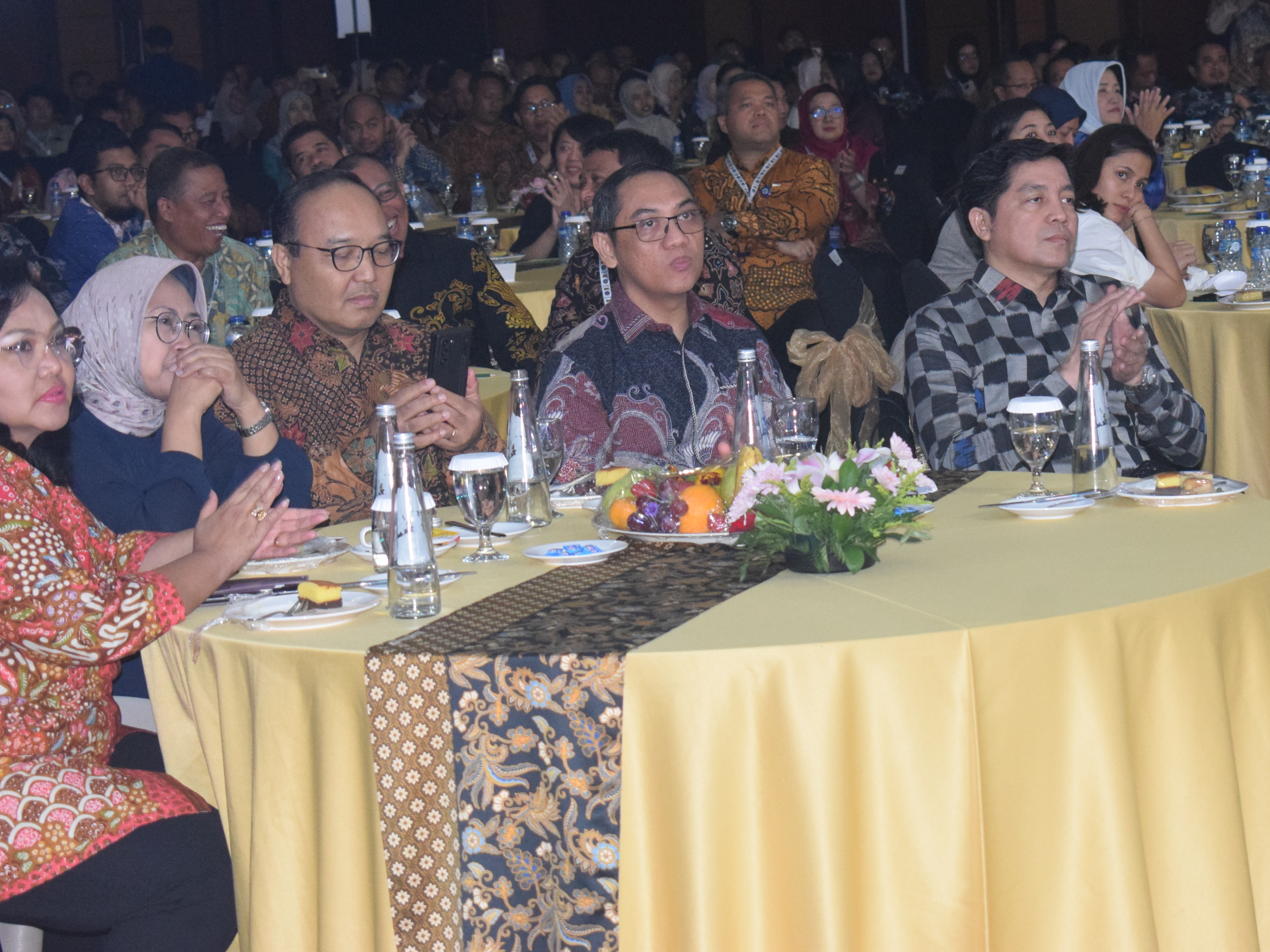
Sabar (front table, second from right) with other government officials at the government PR awarding ceremony in 2025.

During his tenure, Sabar oversaw the blocking of prominent websites. On 28 May 2025, he announced that Internet Archive was temporarily blocked in Indonesia due to the presence of gambling and pornography on the website. According to Sabar, his directorate general had already warned the website but received no satisfactory response. The block was eventually lifted after two days. Sabar also suspended the digital permit of TikTok in Indonesia after failing to provide data regarding the activity of its live feature during the August 2025 Indonesian protests to the government. Following the Jakarta school bombing, Sabar announced that the directorate general has blocked sites and social media contents accessed by the perpetrator, which contained elements of violence and information about explosives.

On 17 November 2025, Sabar announced that the ministry has warned twenty-five digital service providers in Indonesia for not submitting their digital permit to the government. According to Sabar, service providers that did not comply would be blocked from operating in Indonesia. The companies that were warned included Wikimedia Foundation, Cloudflare, Dropbox, OpenAI, Duolingo, Shutterstock, and Getty Images. With regards to Cloudflare, Sabar stated that the hosting service also facilitates thousands of gambling sites and urged Cloudflare customers in Indonesia to search for alternative providers. The ministry's ultimatum on Cloudflare was met with criticism, with internet users arguing it would weaken Indonesia's internet security and disturb digital activity in Indonesia, as a majority of Indonesian internet users rely on websites hosted by Cloudflare, such as ChatGPT, for their daily lives. On 25 November 2025, the directorate general met with Cloudflare to discuss Cloudflare's compliance with the permit and content moderation. According to Sabar, Cloudflare showed a cooperative stance by their willingness to study and fulfill digital permit obligations and their offer to provide a special reporting channel for the government.

On 2 October 2026, in his first mass rotation of police officers national police chief Suyudi Ario Seto recalled Sabar into the police headquarters as a senior (1st level) legal drafter in the legal division. In a post uploaded on 14 October, communications and digital minister Meutya Hafid thanked Sabar for his service in the ministry.
