= Javanese Wikipedia =

Javanese-language edition of Wikipedia

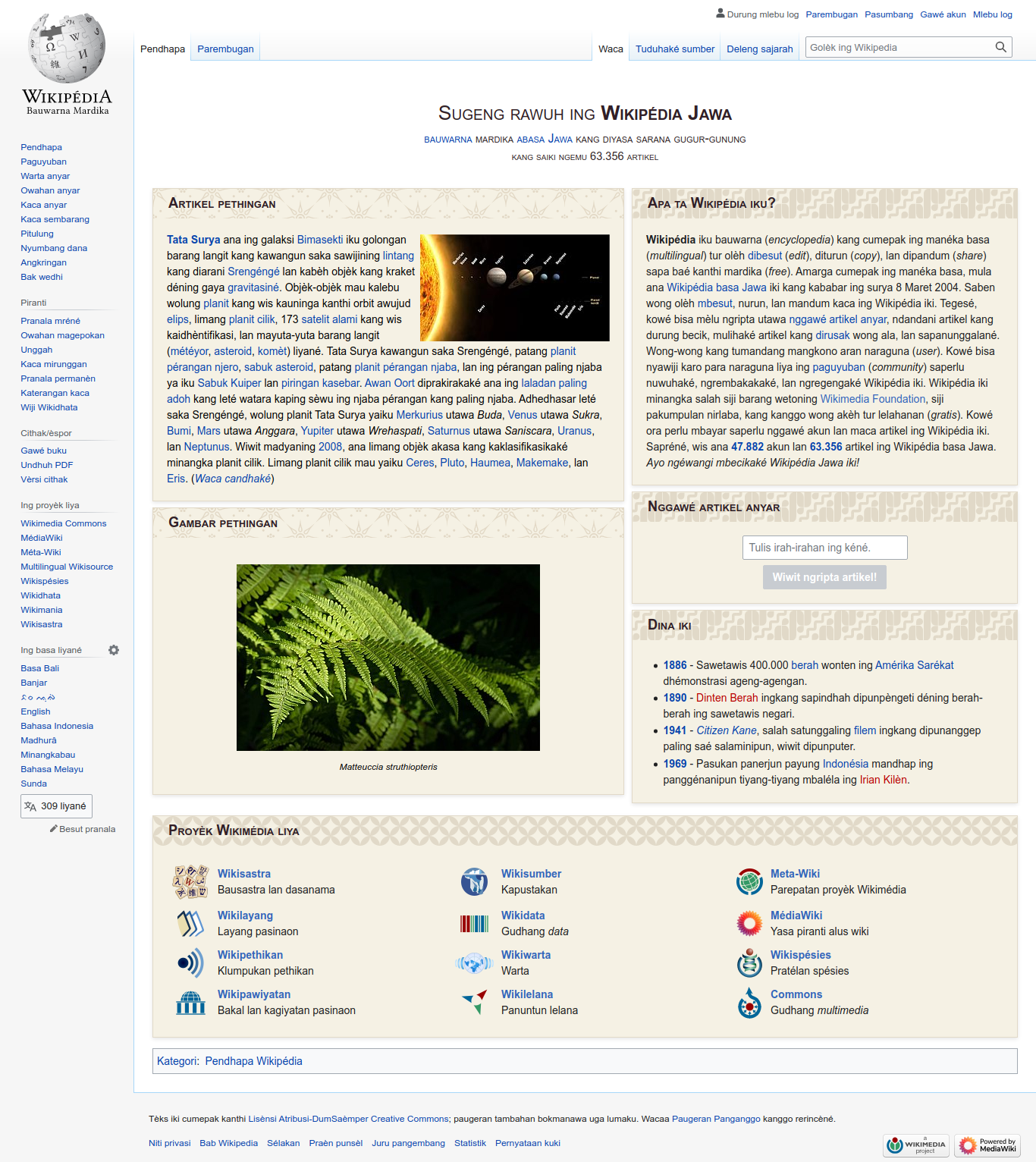
- The Javanese Wikipedia on 1 May 2021
- Website type: Internet encyclopedia project
- Available in: Javanese
- Headquarters: Miami, Florida
- Owner: Wikimedia Foundation
- Website: jv.wikipedia.org
- Commercial: No
- Registration: Optional
- Content license: Creative Commons Attribution/ Share-Alike 4.0 (most text also dual-licensed under GFDL); Media licensing varies

The Javanese Wikipedia (Javanese: Wikipédia basa Jawa) is the edition of Wikipedia in the Javanese language. Started on 8 March 2004, the Javanese Wikipedia reached 10,000 articles on 3 May 2007. As of 19 September 2026, it has more than 75,000 articles. The Indonesian media has discussed the Javanese Wikipedia. Although the Wikipedia logo was written in the Javanese script since the beginning of the edition, the articles themselves could only be written in the Roman script until 2013.

== Milestones ==
Date	Number	Article name	By	User	Time	Article/day
3 August 2010	30.000	Daun, Sangkapura, Gresik	BlackKnight	7.123	52 day	19,23
13 July 2009	20.000	Kandhangserang, Kandhangserang, Pekalongan	Pras	3.858	day	
23 February 2009	17.000	Paku-pakuan	TracySurya	2.793	19 day	52,6
2 February 2009	16.000	Abad kaping-3	Pras	2.648	79 day	12,7
15 November 2008	15.000	Kabupatèn Kutai Kartanegara	Pras	2.102	73 day	13,7
3 September 2008	14.000	Padasaka, Candhimulya, Magelang	Pras	1.673	98 day	10,2
28 May 2008	13.000	Triskaidekafobia	Meursault2004	1.053	118 day	8,47
10 February 2008	12.000	Bucciano	Pras	803	92 day	10,87
10 November 2007	11.000	Puṣpacalita	Meursault2004	718	191 day	5,24
3 May 2007	10.000	Margatiga, Lampung Timur	Slamet Serayu	507	10 day	100
23 April 2007	9.000	Tomohon Timur, Tomohon	Slamet Serayu	499	18 day	55,6
5 April 2007	8.000	Sugriwa	Anggoro	485	2 day	500
3 April 2007	7.000	224	PancenaBot	484	60 day	34,48
3 February 2007	6.000	1856	Meursault2004	427	19 day	xx
15 January 2007	5.000	Przemyśl	Meursault2004	404	174 day	xx
25 July 2006	2.000	Sarpanaka	Anggoro	273	444 day	xx
7 May 2005	1.000	Kakawin Ramayana	Meursault2004		7 day	71,43
30 April 2005	500	Keju	Meursault2004		275 day	xx
29 July 2004	200	Poerbatjaraka	Meursault2004		20 day	5
9 July 2004	100	Adigang, adigung, adiguna	Meursault2004		123 day	0,81
8 March 2004	1	Basa Jawa	Meursault2004	3	0 day	

== Users and editors ==
Javanese Wikipedia statistics
Number of user accounts	Number of articles	Number of files	Number of administrators
73892	75535	4320	5

== Gallery ==
The Javanese Wikipedia on 24 February 2008

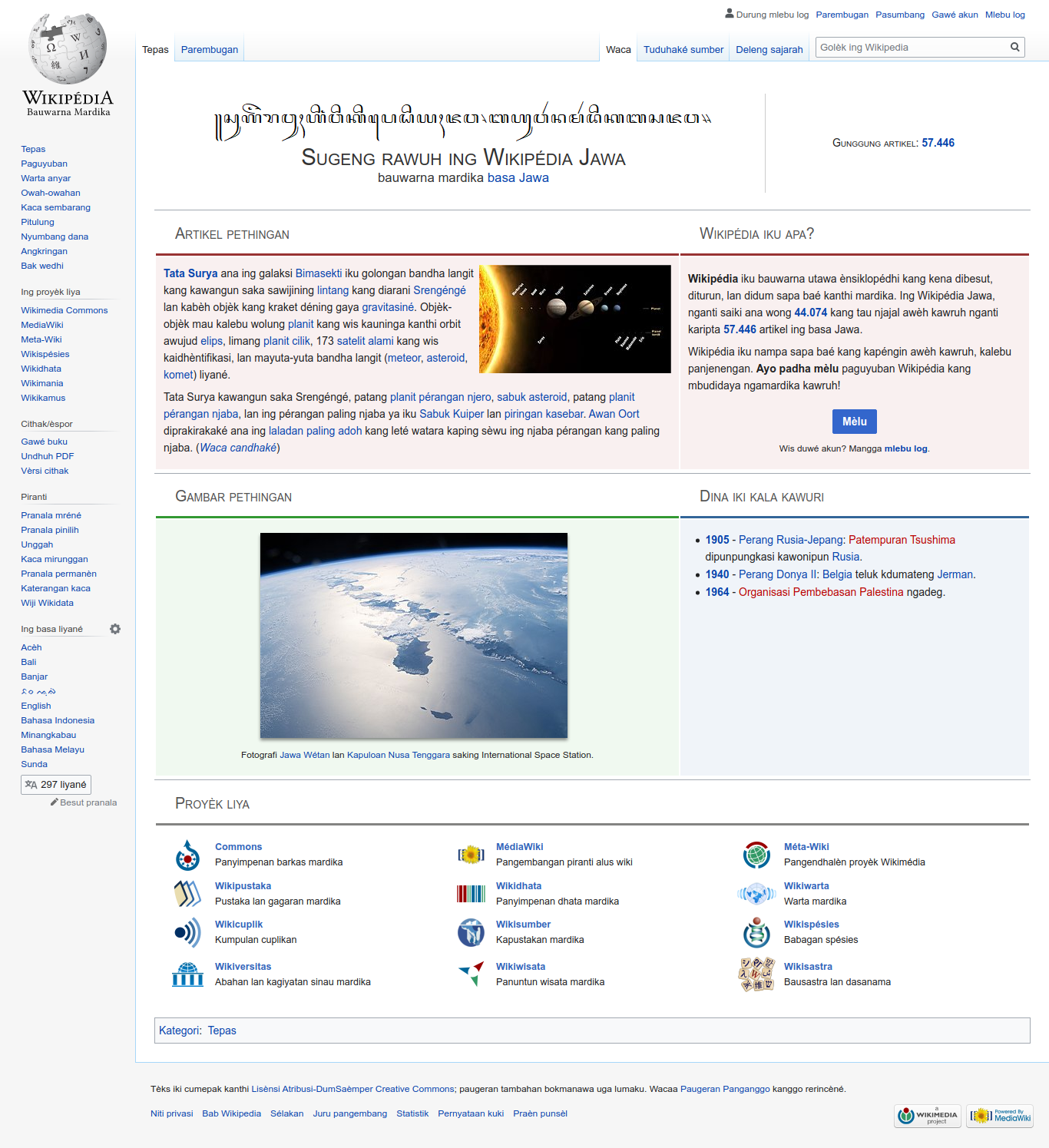
The Javanese Wikipedia on 29 May 2020

== See also ==
- Papat Limpad, writing competition.
- Papat Limpad 2012, writing competition.
