= The Signpost =

English Wikipedia online newspaper

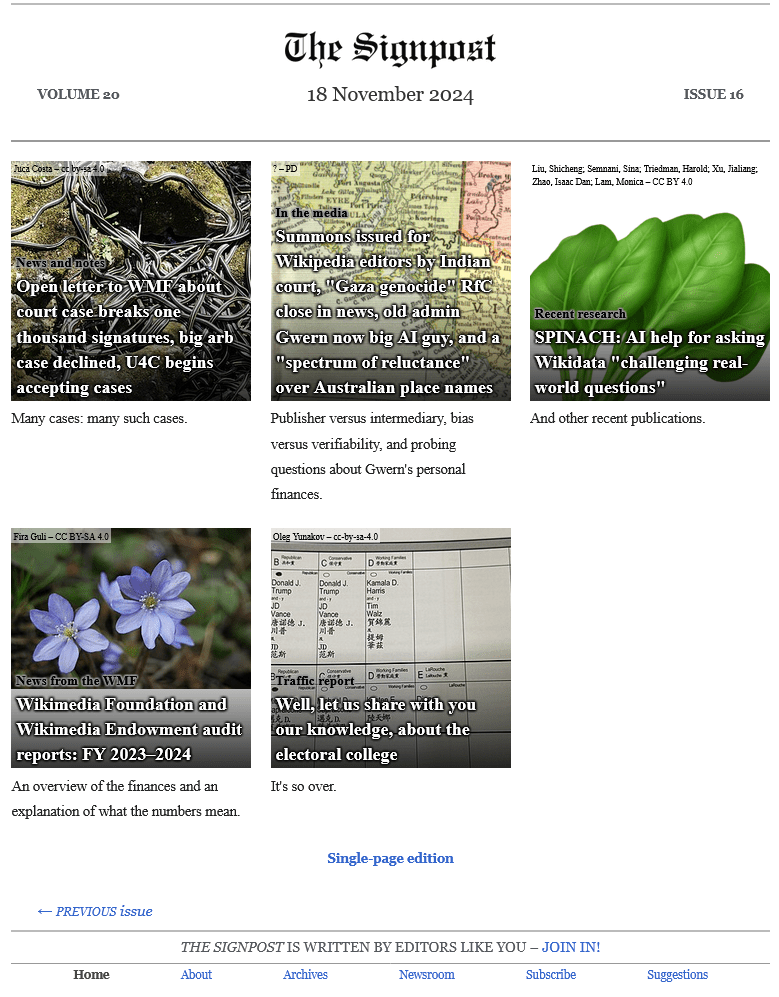
- Cover of The Signpost (November 18, 2024)
- Type: Monthly newspaper
- Format: Online
- Owner: Wikipedia community
- Founder: Michael Snow
- Publisher: English Wikipedia
- Editor-in-chief: JPxG
- Launched: January 10, 2005
- Language: English
- Website: signpost.news (WP:SIGNPOST)

The Signpost (formerly The Wikipedia Signpost) is the English Wikipedia's online newspaper. Managed by the volunteer community of editors, it is published online with contributions from Wikimedia editors. The newspaper's scope includes the Wikimedia community and events related to Wikipedia, including Arbitration Committee rulings, Wikimedia Foundation issues, and other Wikipedia-related projects. It was founded in January 2005 by Wikipedian Michael Snow, who continued as a contributor until his February 2008 appointment to the Wikimedia Foundation's Board of Trustees.

Former editor-in-chief The ed17 noted that during his tenure, from 2012 to 2015, the publication expanded its scope to report on the wider Wikimedia movement in addition to Wikipedia and its community. After it reported on the changes to European freedom of panorama law in June 2015, a number of publications referred to The Signpost for further information.

The Signpost has been the subject of academic analysis in several journals, and has been consulted by researchers from Los Alamos National Laboratory and Dartmouth College. It has been covered by several publications, including John Broughton's 2008 book Wikipedia: The Missing Manual, which called it essential for ambitious new Wikipedia editors.

== History ==
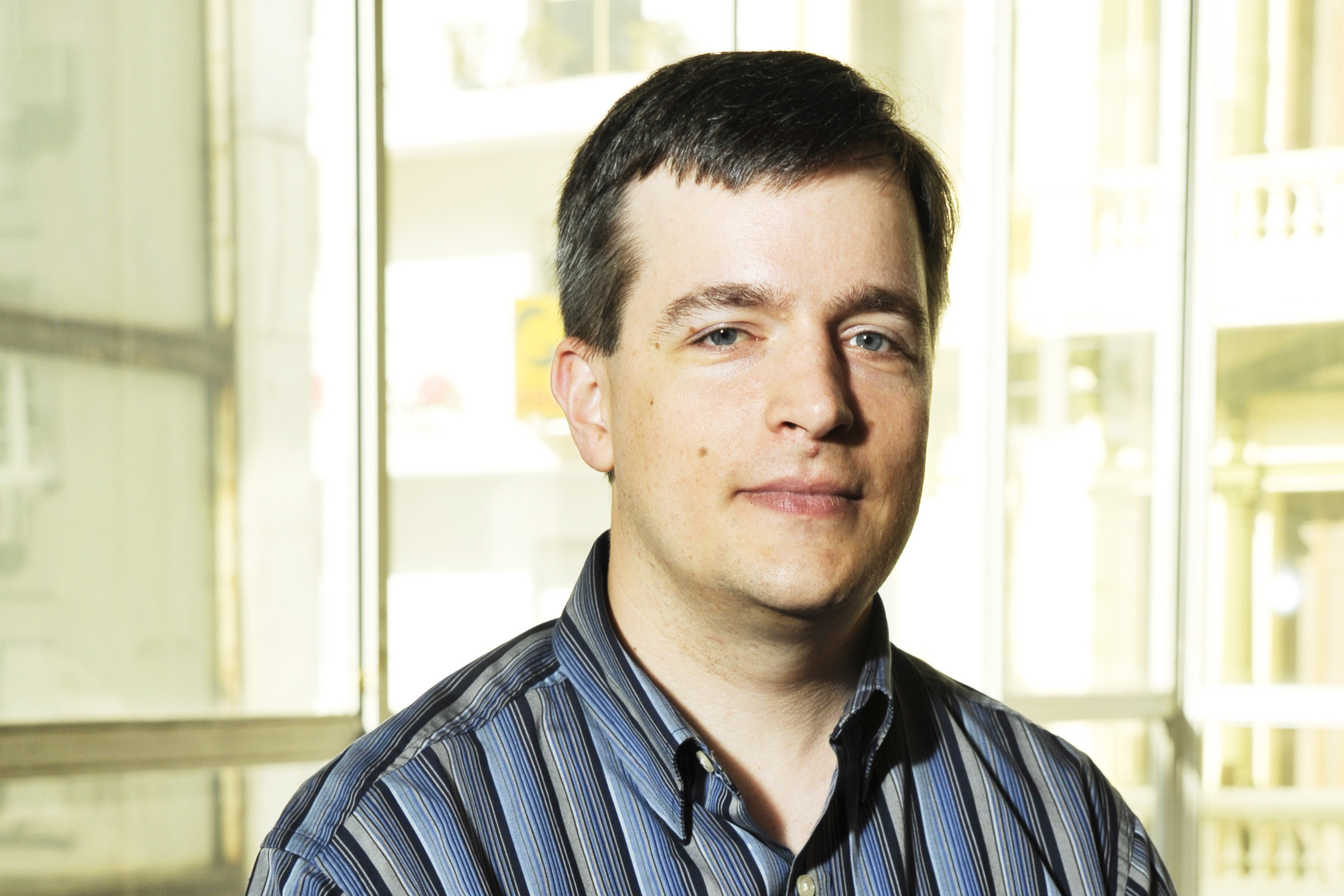
Signpost founder Michael Snow later chaired the Wikimedia Foundation's board of trustees.

The online newspaper, first published in January 2005 as The Wikipedia Signpost, was later renamed The Signpost. It was founded by the lawyer Michael Snow, a Wikipedian who later chaired the Wikimedia Foundation's Board of Trustees. Similar efforts had been made with Wikipedia:Announcements by Larry Sanger on November 20, 2001, Wikimedia News on Meta-Wiki November 14, 2002, and Wikipedia-Kurier in the German Wikipedia on December 10, 2003.

Snow wrote in its first issue: "I hope this will be a worthwhile source of news for people interested in what is happening around the Wikipedia community", and said that The Signpost's name was suggested by the Wikipedia practice of editors digitally signing talk-page posts. He stepped down as editor of The Signpost in August 2005, continuing to write for the newspaper until his February 2008 appointment to the board of trustees. User Ral315 succeeded Snow as editor, writing in his first post: "I'd like to personally thank Michael for his work on the Signpost; it was a great idea that really helped Wikipedians learn more about the happenings on Wikipedia." He conducted a survey for The Signpost in September 2007, estimating a weekly readership of approximately 2,800 Wikipedia users based on survey results.

In July 2008, Ral315 wrote about transparency for The Signpost, acknowledging that at the request of the Wikimedia Foundation, the newspaper had decided not to publish an article about a pending legal case against the foundation. According to the editor, "I feel this was an unfortunate, but necessary move"; because of the newspaper's affiliation with the Wikimedia Foundation, an article about the lawsuit "might have had a severe effect on the case." Ral315 expressed concern about the future impact of the decision: "I'm still rather troubled by the very nature of this situation because it was the first time that I've felt pressured by the Wikimedia Foundation not to write or publish a story. This also leaves us with a dangerous precedent that I'm hoping only to keep in the most serious cases."

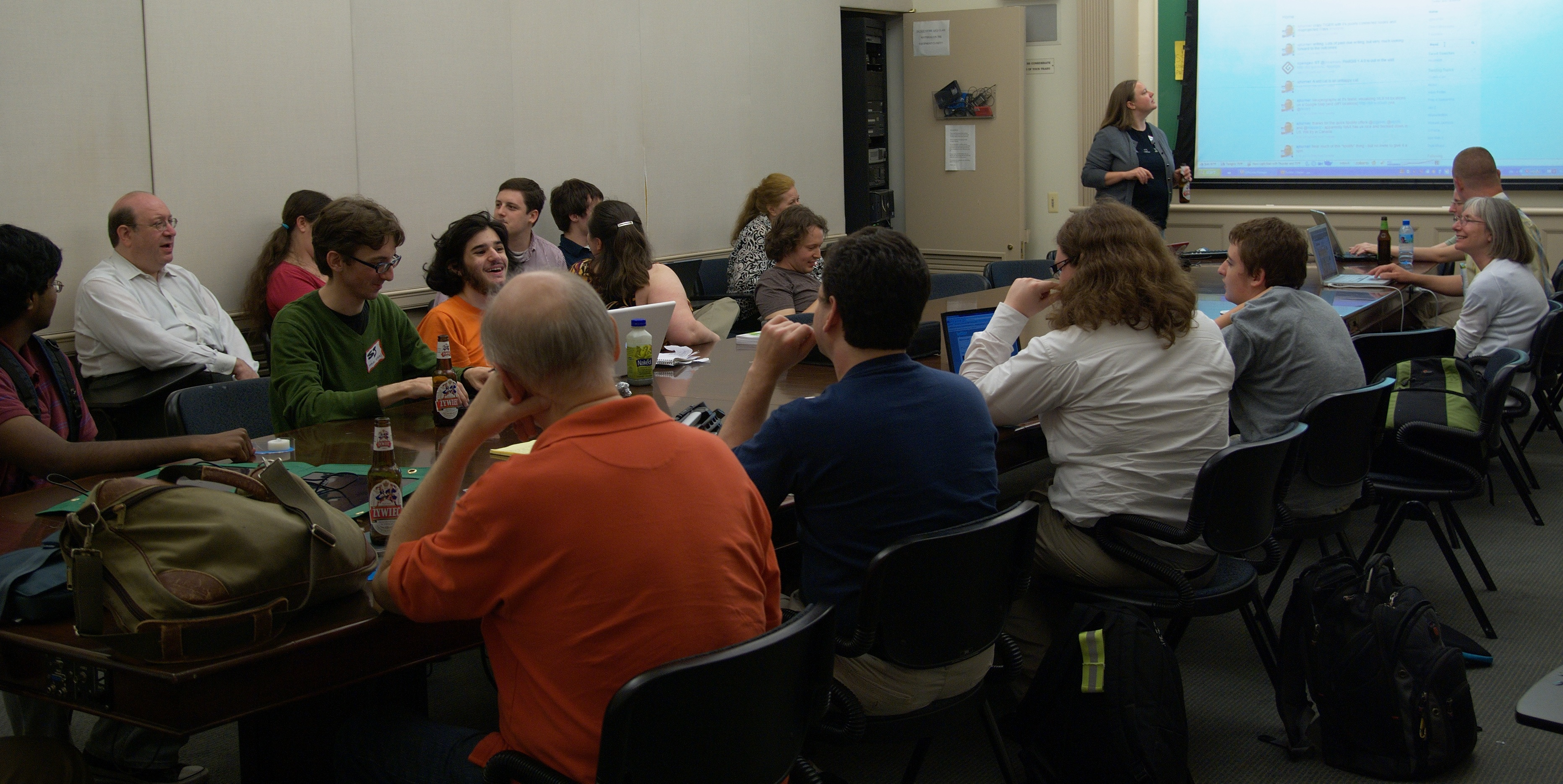
Wikipedia community members working on The Signpost at a conference in New York City, 2009

The Signpost published its 200th issue in November 2008. A total of 1,731 articles had been published, written by 181 contributors. Wikipedia user Ragesoss took over as editor of the newspaper in February 2009, in an issue that featured a new layout. Ragesoss resigned as editor in June 2010, and HaeB took over as the newspaper debated changing its name from The Wikipedia Signpost to The Signpost. That year, sister Wikipedia publications managed by volunteer contributors included The Wikipedia Weekly, a podcast, and The Wikizine, a news bulletin (now defunct).

HaeB resigned as editor after he was hired by the Wikimedia Foundation in July 2011: "It would make it too much of a conflict of interest if I were to continue to make final editorial decisions for a community-run publication." After three interim editors-in-chief, Wikipedia user The ed17 took over in May 2012 as The Signpost's eighth editor. He previously edited The Bugle, the publication of the WikiProject dedicated to improving the encyclopedia's military history articles. The International Business Times noted in a 2013 article that The Signpost's investigative journalism uncovered a link between the Wiki-PR firm and conflict-of-interest editing on Wikipedia.

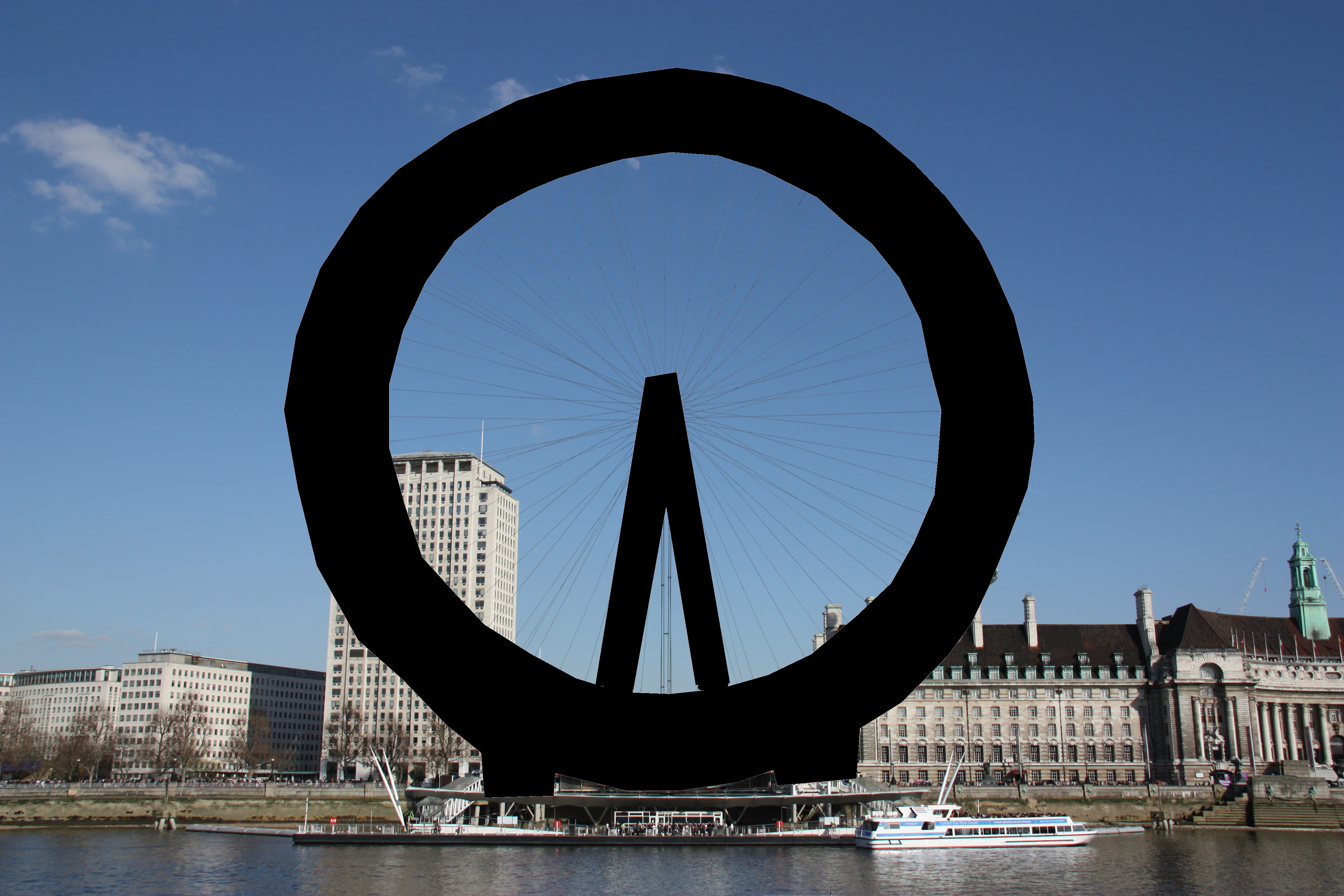
2015 reporting by The Signpost on changes to freedom of panorama copyright restrictions in Europe was covered by publications in several languages, including German, Italian, Polish, and Russian.

After its June 2015 reporting on the likelihood of increased copyright restrictions in Europe involving changes to freedom of panorama, The Signpost was consulted for information by publications in several languages, including English, German, Italian, Polish, and Russian.

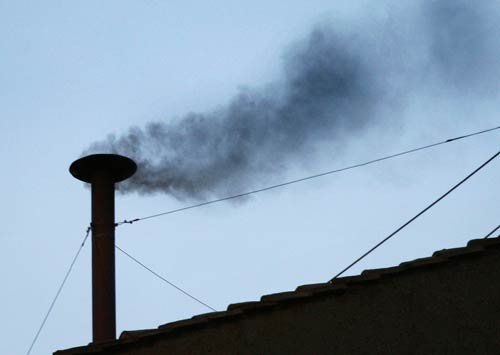
Heise Online highlighted the use of a papal conclave image in a Signpost article about the controversy with Wikimedia Foundation executive director Lila Tretikov, saying that it symbolized pressure on the foundation's board of trustees.

Wikipedia users Gamaliel and Go Phightins! became editors-in-chief of The Signpost in January 2015. The ed17 noted that during his tenure, the newspaper expanded its scope beyond the English Wikipedia to the wider Wikimedia movement. In a January 2015 tenth-anniversary retrospective, Gamaliel emphasized that further improvements to the newspaper depended on collaboration and involvement by the Wikipedia community and invited users to contribute suggestions and join the editing team. In their first issue of the newspaper as editors-in-chief, Go Phightins! and Gamaliel wrote about The Signpost's unique role: "We will strive to maintain our voice and standing as an independent entity, separate from the WMF, Wikimedia chapters, WikiEd, or other entities."

In January 2016, Fortune and Ars Technica relied on The Signpost in reporting a vote of no confidence by Wikipedia editors against Arnnon Geshuri joining the Wikimedia Foundation Board of Trustees. While reporting in February 2016 about controversy and confusion at the Wikimedia Foundation concerning executive director Lila Tretikov remaining in her position, The Signpost illustrated its article with a photo of black smoke emanating from a chimney in reference to the papal conclave used to select a pope. According to Heise Online, the photo indicated pressure on the board to take action. Andreas Kolbe wrote for The Signpost "that the creation of a successful search engine would transform volunteers into 'unpaid hamsters.'"

Go Phightins! and Gamaliel remained co-editors-in-chief until the latter's resignation from Wikipedia in May 2016; Go Phightins! would continue until August, when the role was passed to Andreas Kolbe and Pete Forsyth. In November of that year, Kolbe departed, and in June 2017, Evad37 assumed the role of sole editor-in-chief. Between 2018 and 2019, Bri and Kudpung both edited several issues; in March 2019, Smallbones was selected as the next editor-in-chief. In May 2022, he retired from the position, succeeded by EpicPupper and JPxG, who were co-editors-in-chief until the former's resignation in September of that year. Currently, the editor-in-chief is JPxG.

In 2018, a Signpost article by writer (and later editor-in-chief) Smallbones broke the news that World Patent Marketing, a company whose advisory board included then-acting United States Attorney General Matthew Whitaker, had likely made inappropriate edits to Whitaker's Wikipedia article, saying: "an editor with an account name almost identical to that of a WPM PR agent, as named in the FOIA release edited the article on Whitaker, adding external links in the text to both WPM's website and Whitaker's law office"; this was subsequently reported on, and cited, by The Wall Street Journal and Newser.

In 2023, a report in The Signpost claimed that there may have been manipulation of several Wikipedia pages related to Gautam Adani and his companies, by use of sock puppets. This story was then picked up by multiple Indian news outlets, including The Times of India and The Hindu.

== Content ==
The Signpost publishes stories relating to the Wikipedia community, the Wikimedia Foundation, and other Wikipedia-related projects, and is provided free of charge. The Wikipedia community manages the newspaper. From 2005 to March 2016, The Signpost was published weekly. In April 2016, the nominal periodicity was changed to "fortnightly" (every two weeks) due to a shortage of contributors. But in January and February 2017 only three issues were published, and none in March, April or May. It is now published monthly. Readers may choose to be notified of a new issue by email or, with a Wikipedia account, on their user talk page.

The newspaper informs Wikipedia editors about ongoing collaborative projects to improve articles on the site and is a location for centralized notices of recent academic studies about Wikipedia. The Signpost includes an arbitration report, formerly known as "The Report on Lengthy Litigation", which details proceedings by Wikipedia's Arbitration Committee.

The Signpost archives are publicly available, facilitating study of the history of Wikipedia.

== Analysis ==
The Signpost is a subcommunity within the larger Wikipedia community.

Researchers at Los Alamos National Laboratory and Dartmouth College relied on Signpost archives to track Wikipedia editing outages, presenting their findings at the 2011 IEEEIWIC/ACM International Conference on Web Intelligence. In her 2013 study of Wikipedia and its reputation in higher education in the journal New Review of Academic Librarianship, Gemma Bayliss reviewed the Signpost Twitter feed to confirm the timeliness of her research.

== Reception ==
If you expect to continue editing at Wikipedia ... subscribe to ... The Wikipedia Signpost.

— John Broughton, Wikipedia: The Missing Manual

In 2007 The New York Times called The Signpost a "mocked-up newspaper" with a retro style characteristic of Wikipedia and "its own special brand of kitsch". In his 2008 book Wikipedia: The Missing Manual, John Broughton recommended The Signpost as essential reading for aspiring Wikipedia contributors: "If you expect to continue editing at Wikipedia for any length of time, by all means subscribe to ... The Wikipedia Signpost."

Fortune called The Signpost "Wikipedia's insider newspaper". In a 2016 article The Register's executive editor, Andrew Orlowski, called The Signpost "Wikipedia's own plucky newsletter." According to Ars Technica tech-policy editor Joe Mullin, documents were leaked to (and published by) The Signpost about the Knight Foundation's Knowledge Engine grant for a Wikimedia Foundation search-engine project in February 2016. Writing about the Knowledge Engine controversy, Nonprofit Quarterly editor-in-chief Ruth McCambridge directed technically minded readers to The Signpost "to better understand what was being planned." In his article for the German magazine Heise Online, Torsten Kleinz wrote: "When official communications ground to a halt, The Signpost ... jumped into the breach, brought unknown facts to light and initiated an informed discussion."

== See also ==
- The Truth According to Wikipedia
- Truth in Numbers?
- Wikipedia – A New Community of Practice?
- The Wikipedia Revolution
- The World and Wikipedia
