= Daniel O'Sullivan =

Daniel, Danny or Dan O'Sullivan may refer to:

- Daniel O'Sullivan (musician) (born 1980), English musician
- Daniel O'Sullivan (priest) (1846–1928), Irish priest and theologian
- Danny O'Sullivan (Australian rules footballer) (born 1952)
- Danny O'Sullivan (boxer) (1923–1990), English boxer
- Dan O'Sullivan (basketball) (born 1968), American basketball player
- Dan O'Sullivan (Gaelic footballer) (1927–2013), Irish Gaelic footballer
- Dan O'Sullivan (historian), British author of Wikipedia – A New Community of Practice?
