= Wikipedia @ 20 =

Book of essays about Wikipedia

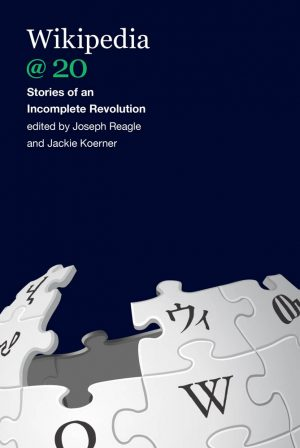
- Wikipedia @ 20 cover graphic
- Editors: Joseph M. Reagle Jr.; Jackie Koerner
- Language: English
- Publisher: MIT Press
- Publication date: October 13, 2020
- ISBN: 978-0-262-53817-6
- OCLC: 1187209148

Wikipedia @ 20 is a book of essays about Wikipedia published by the MIT Press in late 2020, marking 20 years since the creation of Wikipedia. It was edited by academic and author Joseph M. Reagle Jr. and social researcher Jackie Koerner. Contributions came from 34 other Wikipedians, Wikimedians, academics, researchers, journalists, librarians, artists and others, reflecting on particular histories and future themes in Wikipedia discussions.

== Background ==
The title "Wikipedia @ 20" has a distinct style used in 2021 around celebration of Wikipedia's birthday, and the subtitle paraphrases the closing remarks of the preface:

Though Wikipedia was revolutionary twenty years ago, it has yet to become the revolution we need. The important work of sharing knowledge, connecting people, and bridging cultures continues.

— Joseph Reagle and Jackie Koerner, Preface

The book features an introduction by the editors and 21 essays split into three sections: Hindsight, Connection, and Vision. Essays were selected through an open submission process in the spirit of Wikipedia and published using open publishing platform PubPub.

The project was financially supported by Knowledge Unlatched, the Northeastern University Communication Studies Department, and the Wikimedia Foundation so the book could be released in both print and free-to-download digital forms.

== Synopsis ==
The book contains the following essays:

Contents
Section	Essay title	Contributor(s)
	Preface	Joseph Reagle and Jackie Koerner
	Introduction: Connections	Joseph Reagle and Jackie Koerner
Hindsight	The Many (Reported) Deaths of Wikipedia	Joseph Reagle
Hindsight	From Anarchy to Wikiality, Glaring Bias to Good Cop: Press Coverage of Wikipedia’s First Two Decades	Omer Benjakob and Stephen Harrison
Hindsight	From Utopia to Practice and Back	Yochai Benkler
Hindsight	An Encyclopedia with Breaking News	Brian Keegan
Hindsight	Paid with Interest: COI Editing and Its Discontents	William Beutler
Connection	Wikipedia and Libraries	Phoebe Ayers
Connection	Three Links: Be Bold, Assume Good Faith, and There Are No Firm Rules	Rebecca Thorndike-Breeze, Cecelia A. Musselman, and Amy Carleton
Connection	How Wikipedia Drove Professors Crazy, Made Me Sane, and Almost Saved the Internet	Jake Orlowitz
Connection	The First Twenty Years of Teaching with Wikipedia: From Faculty Enemy to Faculty Enabler	Robert Cummings
Connection	Wikipedia as a Role-Playing Game, or Why Some Academics Do Not Like Wikipedia	Dariusz Jemielniak
Connection	The Most Important Laboratory for Social Scientific and Computing Research in History	Benjamin Mako Hill and Aaron Shaw
Connection	Collaborating on the Sum of All Knowledge Across Languages	Denny Vrandečić
Connection	Rise of the Underdog	Heather Ford
Vision	Why Do I Have Authority to Edit the Page? The Politics of User Agency and Participation on Wikipedia	Alexandria Lockett
Vision	What We Talk About When We Talk About Community	Siân Evans, Jacqueline Mabey, Michael Mandiberg, and Melissa Tamani
Vision	Toward a Wikipedia For and From Us All	Adele Godoy Vrana, Anasuya Sengupta, and Siko Bouterse
Vision	The Myth of the Comprehensive Historical Archive	Jina Valentine, Eliza Myrie, and Heather Hart
Vision	No Internet, No Problem	Stephane Coillet-Matillon
Vision	Possible Enlightenments: Wikipedia’s Encyclopedic Promise and Epistemological Failure	Matthew A. Vetter
Vision	Equity, Policy, and Newcomers: Five Journeys from Wiki Education	Ian A. Ramjohn and LiAnna L. Davis
Vision	Wikipedia Has a Bias Problem	Jackie Koerner
	Capstone: Making History, Building the Future Together	Katherine Maher

== Reception ==
The publication was launched during a live stream with an author's round table on Wikipedia Weekly Network on the 20th birthday of Wikipedia, and it was referenced in international media coverage of the 20th anniversary. The book was endorsed by Wikipedia co-founder Jimmy Wales for its "hard-won wisdom of its contributors, the novel reflections of scholars, and the necessary provocations of those working to shape its next twenty years". It was also reviewed critically by Science magazine's Andrew Robinson and furthermore in Bookforum by Rebecca Panovka, who reflected on some of its inconsistencies, ties to "Enlightenment-era liberalism", and lack of voices of less loyal external criticism.

Other mainstream media that referenced the book include The New Yorker, The New Republic and ABC Radio National, as well as technology focused websites. The book is featured in IEEE Xplore, and some of the content of the book was adapted for shorter form publishing, such as a Slate article on how the September 11 attacks shaped Wikipedia.

== See also ==
- The Editors, a 2024 novel based on Wikipedia editing
- Bibliography of Wikipedia
