= Book Publishers LLC =

American publisher and book sales club

- Status: Active
- Country of origin: United States
- Headquarters location: Florida
- Publication types: Books
- Official website: bookpublishersllc.com

Book Publishers LLC formerly Books LLC is an American publisher and a book sales club based in Fort Lauderdale, Florida. Its primary work is collecting Wikipedia and Fandom articles and selling them as printed and downloadable books. In 2023, Book Publishers LLC transitioned to a hybrid publishing model, offering services tailored to the self-publishing market.

== Print-on-demand and electronic products ==
Book Publishers LLC publishes print-on-demand paperback and downloadable compilations of English texts and documents from open knowledge sources such as Wikipedia. Book Publishers LLC's copies of the English Wikipedia are republished by Google Books. Titles are also published in French and German respectively under the names "Livres Groupe" and "Bücher Gruppe". Books' publications do not include the images from the original Web documents but, in their place, URLs pointing to the Web images. According to the FAQ page: “We understand how annoying that can be for the reader. But our first priority has to be respecting copyright laws. In addition, the resolution of the online photos are not high enough to print in a book.”

In 2009, Book Publishers LLC and its sister imprint General Book Publishers LLC produced 224,460 and 11,887 titles respectively.

== Imprint and book club names ==
In brackets: kind of material published and sold.

- Book Publishers LLC or Books Group (English Wikipedia)
- General Book Publishers LLC (public domain material scanned and recognized by OCR)
- General Books Club (public domain material)
- Genbooks.net (public domain material)
- Million-books.com (public domain material)
- Rare Books Club (public domain material)
- Wiki Editions (public domain material and CC-BY-SA material)
- Livres Groupe (French Wikipedia)
- Bücher Gruppe (German Wikipedia)

== See also ==
- Criticism of Amazon
- OmniScriptum
- Philip M. Parker
- PediaPress
