= You Could Look It Up (disambiguation) =

You Could Look It Up is a 2016 book of essays on the history of reference works by Jack Lynch.

You Could Look It Up may also refer to:

- "You Could Look it Up", 1941 magazine short story by James Thurber
- "You could/can look it up", mid-20th-century catchphrases of baseball manager Casey Stengel
- You Could Look it Up, 1979 biography of baseball figure Casey Stengel by Maury Allen
- "You Could Look it Up", 2000s column by Steven Goldman on Baseball Prospectus
