= Good Faith Collaboration =

2010 book by Joseph Michael Reagle

- Author: Joseph M. Reagle Jr.
- Language: English
- Subject: Wikipedia
- Genre: Ethnography
- Publisher: MIT Press
- Publication date: 2010
- Pages: 256
- ISBN: 978-0-262-01447-2
- OCLC: 699490862
- Followed by: Reading the Comments

Good Faith Collaboration: The Culture of Wikipedia is a 2010 book by Joseph M. Reagle Jr. that deals with the topic of Wikipedia and the Wikipedia community. The book was first published on August 27, 2010, through the MIT Press and has a foreword by Lawrence Lessig. The book is an ethnographic study of the history of Wikipedia, its real life and theoretical precursors, and its culture including its consensus and collaborative practices.

The book has been described as a pioneering ethnographic study of the culture of Wikipedia. Reagle's main thesis has been summarized as the argument that "the success of Wikipedia may be less technological than a consequence of the community of Wikipedians and their cultural norms".

== History of publication ==
Good Faith Collaboration is based on Reagle's PhD dissertation. Reagle, the book's author, is a scholar specializing in sociology of the Internet, as well as a Wikipedia volunteer. In writing the book, Reagle relied on documents produced by the Wikipedia community, such as "content pages, discussion pages, mailing lists, newsletters, and meet-ups".

The book was published in 2010 by MIT Press. In September 2011, the Web edition of the book was released under a Creative Commons BY-NC-SA license and Japanese language translation was made on GitHub.

== Synopsis ==
The book is composed of 8 chapters with a foreword by Lawrence Lessig.

The book opens with Chapter 1, "Nazis and Norms", which provides an overview of the text, and the author's methodology. In Chapter 2, "The Pursuit of the Universal Encyclopedia", Reagle explores the history of encyclopedias and of community collaboration, focusing on the 20th century onward. Reagle mentions specific examples such as H.G. Wells' World Brain, Paul Otlet's Universal Repository, and the collaborative practices of Quakers.

Chapter 3, "Good Faith Collaboration", and Chapter 4, "The Puzzle of Openness", begin the ethnographic parts of the book. They discuss reasons why Wikipedia has met its intended purpose; these reasons include the effects of the project's core policies, such as neutral point of view, no original research, and verifiability, all made possible due to the "good faith", represented by virtues such as "assuming the best of others, patience, civility, and humor". The book's title itself alludes to the Wikipedia policy "Assume Good Faith" (AGF); Reagle argues that this policy has been a key to the Wikipedia project's success. Chapter 4 also addresses issues of licensing, as well as whether everything on Wikipedia can be edited by anyone, and the options for those who disagree (such as forking).

The next two chapters focus on the decision-making process within Wikipedia. Chapter 5, "The Challenges of Consensus", discusses the nature of consensus decision making within Wikipedia. Chapter 6, "The Benevolent Dictator", discusses the role of Jimbo Wales, the project's co-founder, as well as other less famous elements of Wikipedia's hierarchy, such as administrators, the Arbitration Committee, and the Wikimedia Foundation's Board of Trustees.

In Chapter 7, "Encyclopedic Anxiety", Reagle analyzes the popular and critical discussion of Wikipedia, including those of concerns about the prevalent "amateurism" of the project.

== Reception ==
William S. Kowinski, in a review of the book for the North Coast Journal published in 2010, wrote that "What this book does well is describe how Wikipedia works and what issues have arisen... this may remain the best opportunity for learning about this remarkable project."

Cory Doctorow, in a 2010 review on the Boing Boing portal, said that Reagle "offers a compelling case that Wikipedia's most fascinating and unprecedented aspect isn't the encyclopedia itself – rather, it's the collaborative culture that underpins it: brawling, self-reflexive, funny, serious, and full-tilt committed to the project".

The book was also reviewed by R. Stuart Geiger for The Wikipedia Signpost that year. He commended the author on his involvement in the Wikipedia project, which has allowed him to create a work that "goes well beyond most accounts written about Wikipedia, insisting on studying Wikipedians both on and in their own terms." Geiger concluded that the book "is well-written, well-sourced, and neutral; something I'd recommend for my mother." He also noted that the book had been praised by the then-director of the Wikimedia Foundation, Sue Gardner, on her blog.

Humphreys Lee, reviewing the book for the Journal of Communication in 2011, noted that it is a welcome addition to the body of ethnographic literature about new digital media. She noted that the book focuses on the production, not consumption of Wikipedia and stressed the historical importance of the wiki technology which was necessary for the development of the Wikipedia project. She concluded that the book "is an important contribution to understanding the collaborative culture of media production and the open content community".

Jeff Loveland, in his review published in 2011 in Annals of Science, wrote that the book has "one major weakness, namely in historical contextualization", but praised it as a de facto introduction to Wikipedia, exploring the "insightful and worthwhile" topic of ethnography of Wikipedia.

Paul Youngquist, in his 2011 review for symploke, noted that the book is worthy to recommend "to anyone interested in the history of infotech and its new forms of collective agency".

José-Carlos Redondo-Olmedilla, reviewing the book for The Information Society in 2012, wrote "Reagle's book on the culture of Wikipedia gives an accurate account of this sociocultural and sociotechnological phenomenon that Wikipedia is" and concluded that "it is definitely an excellent read and an accomplished exercise of transparency".

Olivia Auxier, writing a review for the International Journal of Communication in 2013, noted that "Reagle’s book is mostly descriptive but does offer some theoretical ideas about the issues Wikipedia faced early on and that it will continue to confront".

Mayo Fuster Morell, in her 2013 review in the Information, Communication & Society, commended Reagle's book for pioneering the study of Wikipedia using an ethnographic approach, "particularly in terms of its cultural and historical specificity".

Craig Hight, in his 2013 review for Media International Australia, concluded that "this is a detailed and persuasive analysis of the nature of the Wikipedia community, and a valuable addition to critical and reflective accounts of the technological, social and political dimensions of contemporary media platforms".

Piotr Konieczny, reviewing the book for Social Forces in 2014, wrote that while the book might not address all possible aspects of the Wikipedia project, it "has earned itself a place of a classic in the studies of Wikipedia, and, likely, in the bookshelves dedicated to the open content communities and online ethnography".

== See also ==
- Bibliography of Wikipedia
- Common Knowledge?: A monograph about Wikipedia, written by the internet researcher Dariusz Jemielniak
