= Zachary McDowell =

American researcher

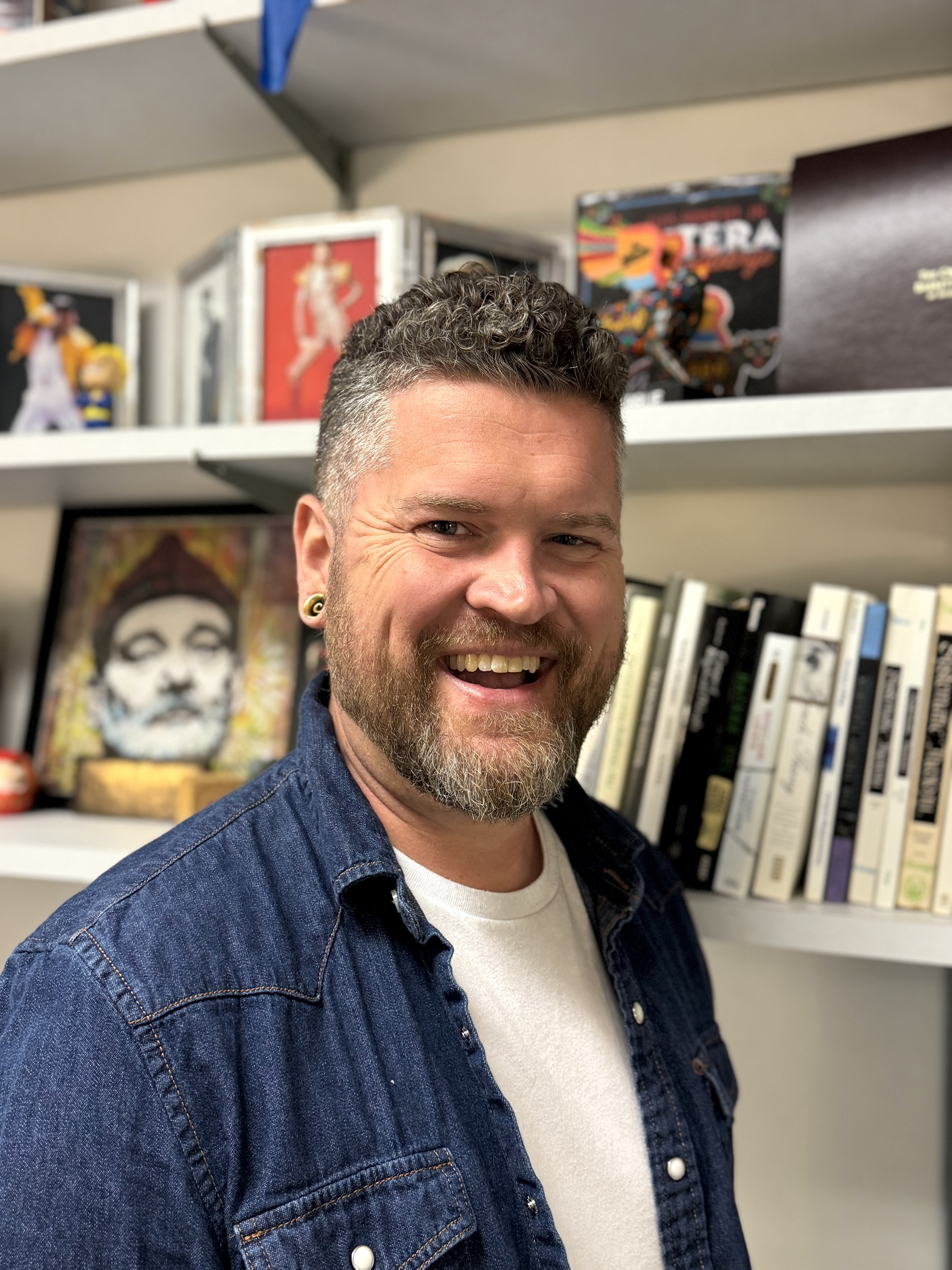

Academic background
- Education: PhD University of Massachusetts Amherst

Academic work
- Institutions: University of Illinois Chicago
- Notable works: Wikipedia and the representation of reality

Zachary "Zach" McDowell is an associate professor of communication, information, and media theory at University of Illinois Chicago. A major focus of McDowell's research has been Wikipedia.

McDowell obtained his PhD from University of Massachusetts Amherst and worked for the Wiki Education Foundation before going to teach at University of Illinois Chicago.

== Wikipedia and the Representation of Reality ==
In 2021, McDowell and co-author Matthew Vetter had their book Wikipedia and the Representation of Reality published by Routledge. Writing in Composition Studies, Vanessa Osborne wrote, "McDowell and Vetter's book exhibits a deep knowledge of the workings, contradictions, and flaws that underlie Wikipedia" while suggesting that "Educators may finish the book hopeful that Wikipedia will improve to better serve its mission and eager to contribute but could use tangible ways to begin this important work." Similarly, Isabelle Langrock criticizes that the authors "...often assume a familiarity of Wikipedia's prominent place in the information environment. Readers who quibble with this assumption will find their concerns sparsely addressed" while concluding that, "Those invested in the improvement of information environments... will find McDowell and Vetter's book a clear guide to one of the most important informational resources available" in the International Journal of Communication.

Robert Cummings in Computers and Composition offered a more positive review noting the ways that the book documents both the impact Wikipedia has and the many problems the project has both as a community and with the topics the encyclopedia covers, "McDowell and Vetter help readers to understand that the famously sexist, misanthropic, bullying, and petty behaviors of some Wikipedia editors are not inconsequential and isolated bad behaviors, or examples of how generic online interactions can filter out everything but the worst in people, but they are in fact the logical products of how these Wikimedia communities were created...The next time you conduct a Google search, or hear Alexa's voice, or encounter any type of online representation of knowledge, we would all be wise to remember this work, and pause to think of the flawed, biased, and evolving collaboration that produced it."

== Selected publications ==
- McDowell, Z.J., "Wikipedia and AI: Access, Representation, and Advocacy in the Age of LLMs." Convergence. March 2024. (OA/ IF 2.9)
- McDowell, Z.J., Vetter, M. "The Re-Alienation of the Commons: Wikidata and the ethics of 'Free' Data in Machine Learning" January 2024, vol 18, 590–608. International Journal of Communication. (OA / IF: 2.02)
- McDowell, Z.J., Tiidenberg, K. "The (not so) Secret Governors of the Internet: Morality Policing and Platform Politics." Convergence. August 4, 2023. (OA / IF 2.9)
- McDowell, Z.J., Vetter, M. "Fast Truths and Slow Knowledge; Oracular Answers and Wikipedia's Epistemology." Fast Capitalism. November 2022. Vol 19, No. 1. 101–112. (OA / Not Rated)
- McDowell, Z.J., Vetter, M. "Wikipedia as Open Educational Practice: Experiential Learning, Critical Information Literacy and Social Justice." Social Media + Society February 2022. (OA / IF 6.0)
- McDowell, Z.J., Vetter, M. "It takes a Village to Combat a Fake News Army: Wikipedia and Information Literacy." Social Media + Society. July 2020. (OA / IF 6.0)
- McDowell, Z.J., and Stewart, M.D. "Student Learning Outcomes with Wikipedia-Based Assignments." International Journal of Open Educational Resources. Volume 1, Issue 2 Spring/Summer 2019 ISSN 2641-5488. (OA / Not Rated)
- McDowell, Z.J., "Disrupting Academic Publishing: Questions of Access in a Digital Environment." Media Practice and Education. 19, 52–67. 2018. (OA / Citescore 1.3)
- McDowell, Z.J., and Soha, M. (2016). "Monetizing a Meme: YouTube, ContentID & the Harlem Shake." Social Media + Society. January–March, 1–12. (OA / IF 6.0)
- McDowell, Z.J. (2010). "Nerd Play: Puzzle Hunting as Participatory Knowledge Creation." International Journal of Sport and Society. 1, 17–26. (SJR 0.13)

== See also ==
- List of Wikipedia people
- Wikipedia-based education
