= Print Wikipedia =

2015 art project

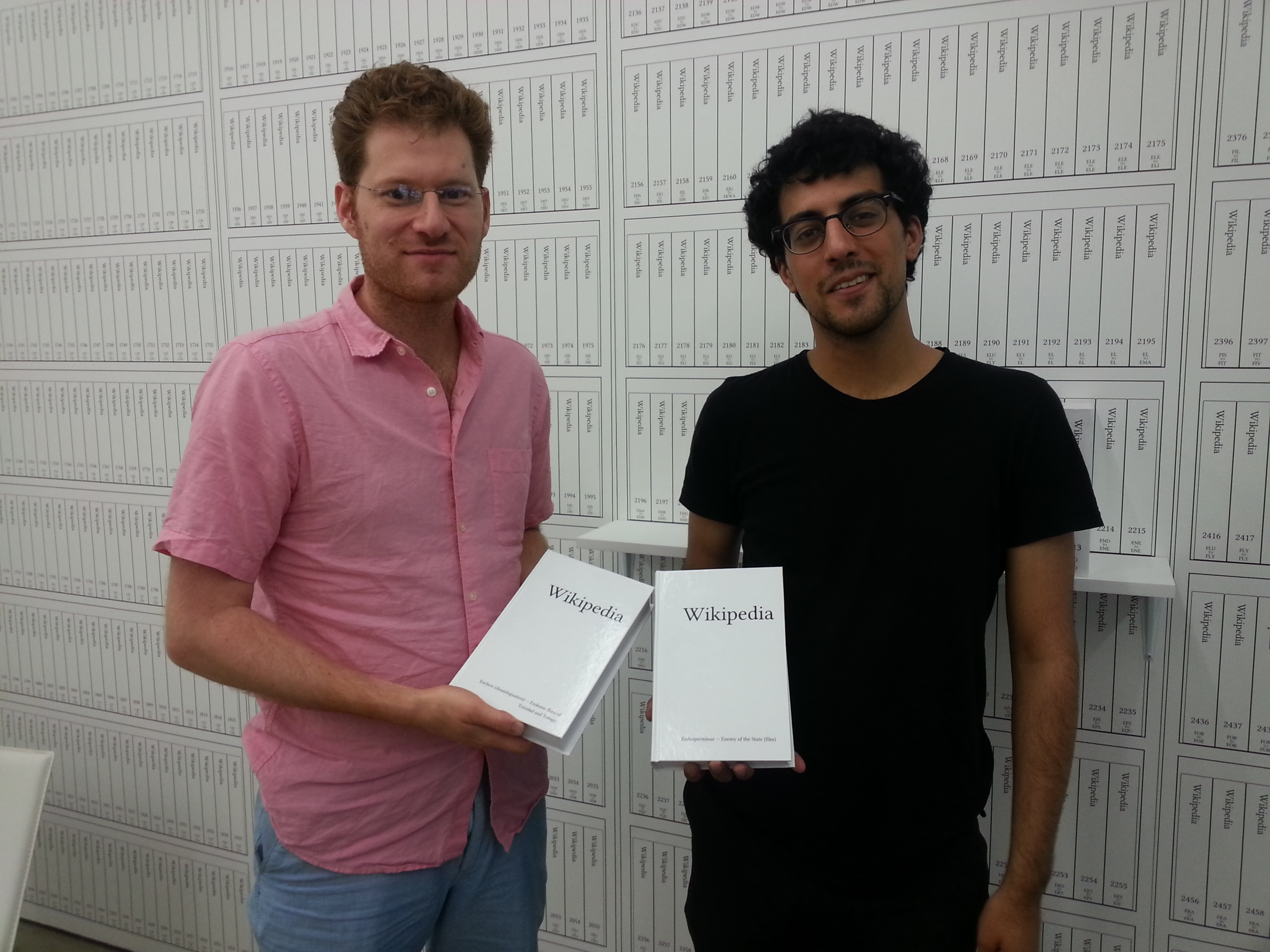
Artist Michael Mandiberg and assistant Jonathan Kiritharan of the "Print Wikipedia" project, at the "From Aaaaa! to ZZZap!" exhibition, on the day before its opening at Denny Gallery, New York City, US

Print Wikipedia is an art project by Michael Mandiberg that involved producing a printed edition of 106 volumes of the English Wikipedia as it existed on April 7, 2015. The bound paper volumes, each containing 700 pages, represented a portion of the 7,473 total volumes needed to print the encyclopedia's text as of that date. First exhibited at the Denny Gallery in New York City during the summer of 2015, the project featured a display of the spines of the first 1,980 volumes in the set. The 106 printed volumes included only the text of the encyclopedia articles, omitting images and references. In addition to the printed volumes of articles, further volumes included an appendix listing all 7.5 million contributors to the English Wikipedia (in 36 volumes) and a table of contents (in 91 volumes). In total, including these metadata volumes, 7,600 volumes were digitally created and uploaded to the print-on-demand site Lulu.com.

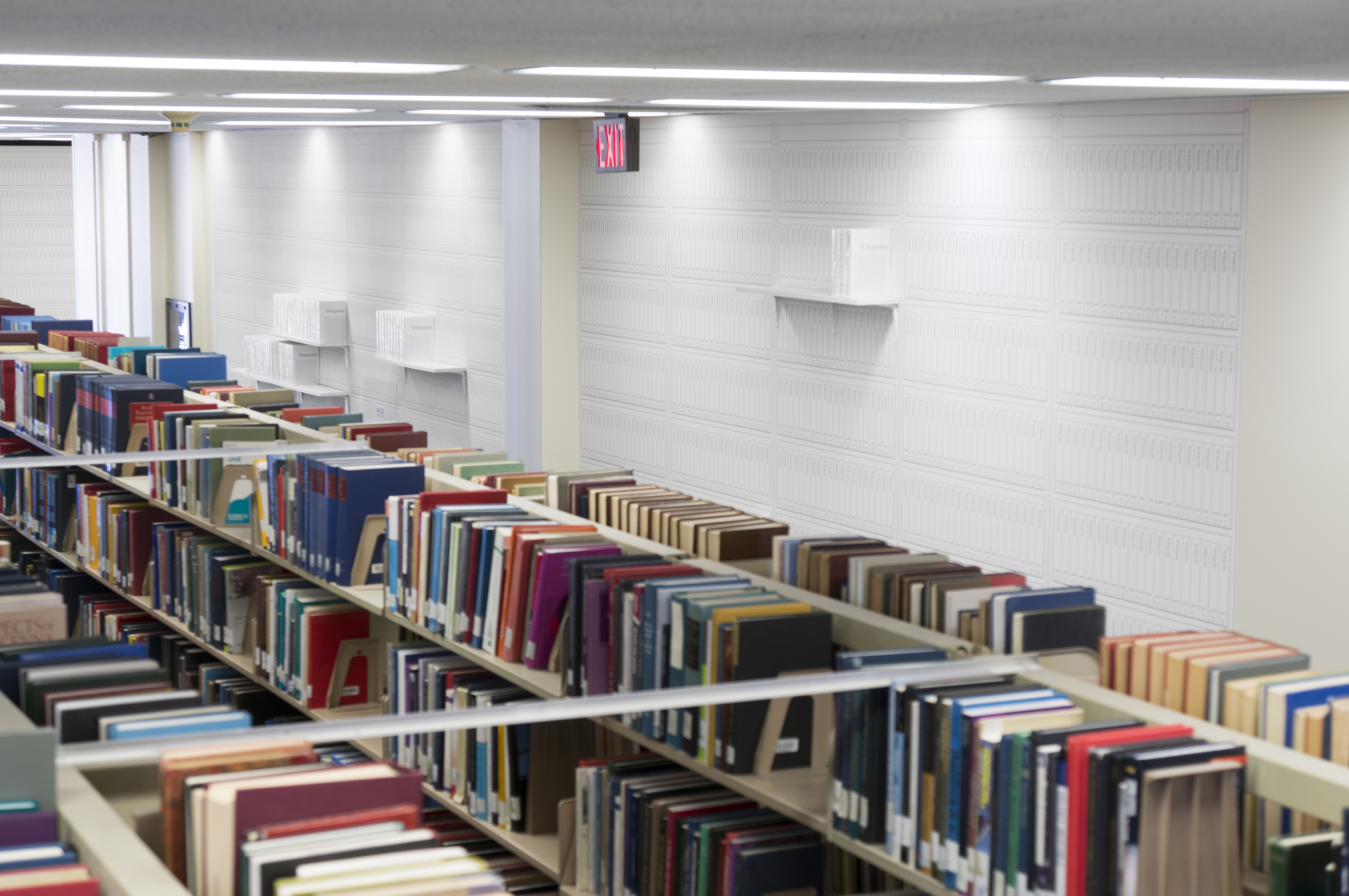
Print Wikipedia on display on the wall at Arizona State University

From February 24 to May 21, 2016, it was exhibited inside the Charles Trumbull Hayden Library on the Arizona State University Tempe campus, adjacent to the library's conventional encyclopedia section.

== Background ==
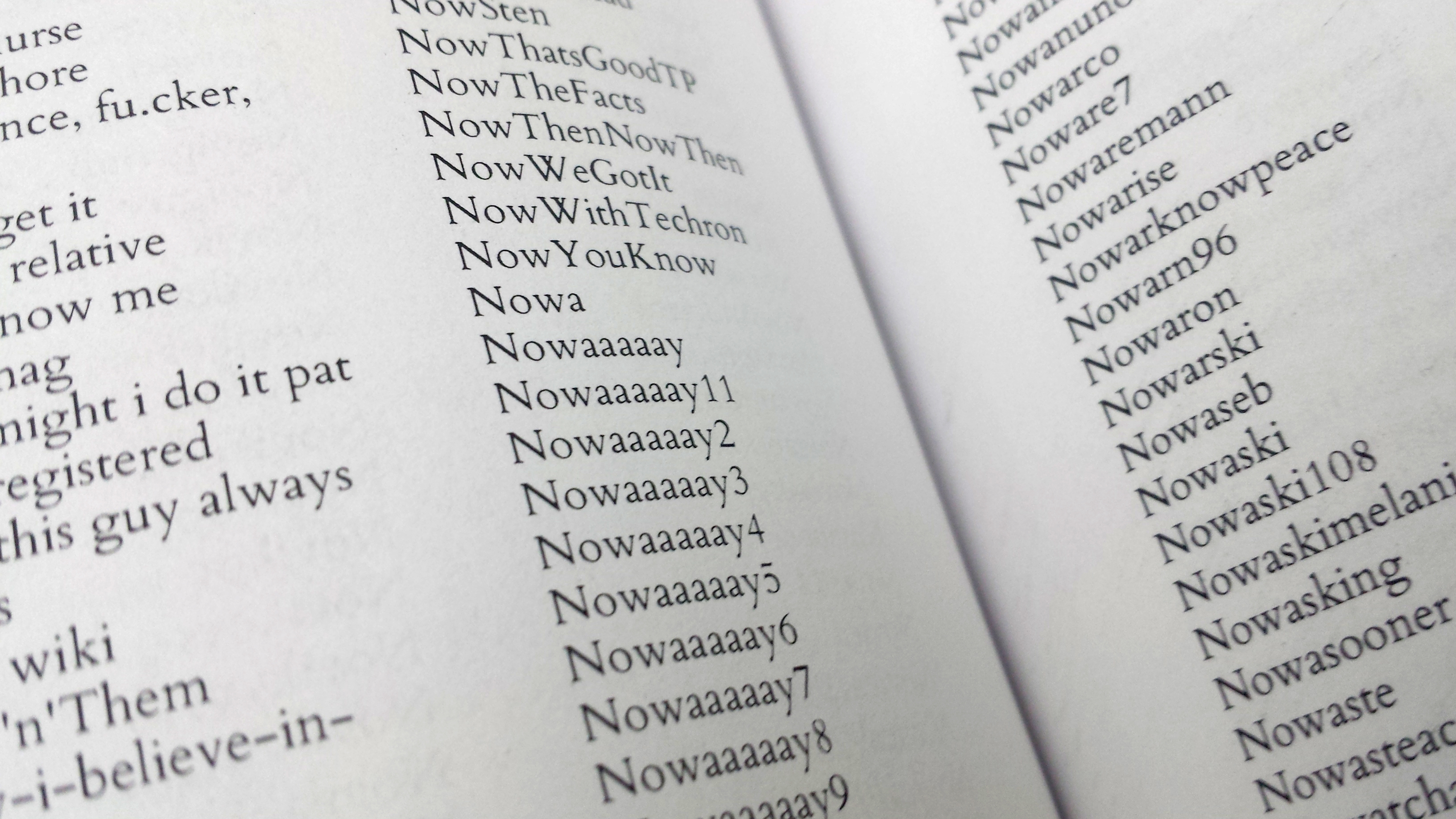
Wikipedia page from Contributor Appendix (detail)

Mandiberg originally conceived the project in 2009 but ran into technical difficulties. In 2012, progress on the project was made, with "a series of unending nontrivial programming tasks" required to compile, format, and upload the entire contents of English Wikipedia. The print files were uploaded to book self-publisher Lulu.com and made available for printout as paper volumes. Mandiberg had an assistant, Jonathan Kiritharan.

Mandiberg states that his motivation was to answer the question, "How big is it?". For a big data entity, its size is on the threshold of what can be perceived as a collection of volumes, but not so large as to overwhelm one's senses, such as the data files of Facebook or the NSA. Katherine Maher, the executive director of the Wikimedia Foundation, described it as "a gesture at knowledge". Wikimedia cooperated with the project, which was partially funded by the printing site, Lulu.com.

Michael Mandiberg talks about Print Wikipedia.

The project was completed over the course of three years, and the upload process took 24 days, 3 hours, and 18 minutes. It was completed on July 12, 2015. PediaPress had attempted to raise money for a full English Wikipedia printout on Indiegogo in 2014, with a goal of $50,000 (£30,000), but the project was pulled. The abandoned project had intended to print 1,000 volumes of 1,200 pages each: a total of 1,200,000 pages, roughly equal to 80 m (260 ft) of shelf space. Mandiberg later assured people that they would not be printing out the entire collection, claiming that an entire collection is not necessary for people to comprehend the true size of Wikipedia, and, once people have seen a portion of it, it will help them realize its size. Mandiberg estimates that the printing costs of a full printout would be around $500,000. The Denny art exhibit featured only a selection of printed volumes, with about 2,000 other volumes represented as spines on the wall. The show revolved around the actual upload of the print files to the printing site.

== Influence ==
Similar art projects have printed part of the German Wikipedia (Berlin, 2016) and the Dutch Wikipedia (Ghent, 2016).

== See also ==
- Bibliography of Wikipedia
- 2015 in art
- de:Print Wikipedia: from Aachen to Zylinderdruckpresse - German entry about their project regarding German Wikipedia
