= The Culture of Connectivity =

The Culture of Connectivity: A Critical History of Social Media
- Author: José van Dijck
- Language: English
- Publisher: Oxford University Press
- Publication date: 2013
- Media type: Print
- Pages: 228
- ISBN: 978-0-19-997078-0

The Culture of Connectivity: A Critical History of Social Media is a book by José van Dijck published by Oxford University Press in 2013 on social media platforms and their history. The author considers the histories of five social media platforms: Facebook, Twitter, Flickr, YouTube, and Wikipedia. She focuses on how their technological, social and cultural dimensions contribute to their current status.

== See also ==
- Bibliography of Wikipedia
