= Connectivity (media) =

Connections forged through social media

Connectivity refers broadly to social connections forged through mediated communications systems. That is, "since the arrival of the World Wide Web and the spread of mobile communications, mediated connectivity has been quietly normalized as central to a consolidating 'global imaginary'". One aspect of this is the ability of the social media to accumulate economic capital from the users' connections and activities on social media platforms by using certain mechanisms in their architecture. According to several scholars (van Dijck and Poell) "it is a key element of social media logic, having a material and metaphorical importance in social media culture". This concept originates from the technological term of "connectivity" but its application to the media field has acquired additional social and cultural implications. The increasing role of social media in everyday life serves as the basis of such connectivity in the 21st century. It shows the interrelations between the users activities on social media and at the same time the empowerment of the social media platforms with the data that was produced by the users and given to those services for granted.

== Notion of connectivity ==
Connectivity developed with the rise of the Internet, first with the introduction Web 1.0 and later Web 2.0. New improvements in equipment, software, the advancement of speed and access have increased the level and quality of connectivity. Along with these improvements, new media such as social networking systems (e.g. Facebook, Twitter, Google+), websites that provide access to user-generated content (e.g. YouTube, Myspace, Flickr), trading and marketing sites (e.g. Amazon, eBay, Groupon) and also game sites (e.g. FarmVille, The Sims Social) have become an essential part of everyday life of an average user: "Just as electricity in the 19th and 20th centuries transformed societies by penetrating every fibre of people's personal and professional lives, network connectivity is probably the most powerful transformative force in early 21st-century cultures". This made a shift in the understanding of the nature of connectivity and moved the initial focus just from a technical side of the notion to its increasingly acquired techno-socio-cultural character.

As mentioned before, connectivity is built on the principles of Web 2.0. that promote an openness, create the vision of empowerment of the user in the generation of a new content and coordination of the information flow on the Internet. These mechanisms encourage staying in touch with each other despite distances and share as much data as possible. According to Youngs, the development of the Internet has resulted in the deeper permeation of ICTs into public and private spheres of peoples' life, their relationships and spheres of identity. Hence, connectivity becomes a resource of maintaining these activities. However, van Dijck notices that this connectivity is not just a neutral feature of new media, but is manufactured by the combination of human and technological resources, where the role of technologies is intransparent. Algorithms and protocols that are part of such platforms prompt users activities and online experiences on social media platforms. One of the most prominent activities on social media includes sharing and as Kennedy argues, "sharing rhetoric draws on a cultural image of connectivity. Social media platforms are not the only actors to use such imagining, mobile-based platforms do the same. Network providers, handset manufacturers, and social media platforms each promote social activities of togetherness enabled by their products which evidences a sustained cultural norm of sharing through teletechnologies for the purpose of affective connectivity". Therefore, such architecture creates even bigger demand in connectivity that is continuously exploited by the online market.

== Example of the application of connectivity ==
Facebook can serve as a good example how connectivity is being produced and exploited by social media. Van Dijck mentions three concepts implemented in the technological side of connectivity which result in the connective structure of the platform and in the creation of its additional social and cultural dimensions. These are platform, protocol and interface.

Several scholars (van Dijck, Gillespie) mention in their works the ambiguity of the term "platform" that promises to bring openness, access, to be neutral and help people build social connections and participate in online activities, but in fact implies a more complicated structure of the media, most of the time created for the profit purposes and as the enhancement of control under the users. As for the protocols and interfaces, the algorithms behind the platform are intransparent and presented to the user as intermediaries for "staying in touch", being connected, encouraging to make those connections, but at the same time the platform itself "facilitates the cultivation of 'weak ties' as well as the fabrication of 'strong ties'". Therefore, connectivity becomes a new type of social capital gained from the platform's working principles.

== See also ==
- Web 2.0
- Participatory culture
- Sharing economy
- Network economics
- The Wealth of Networks
