= Stephen Harrison (author) =

American author and journalist

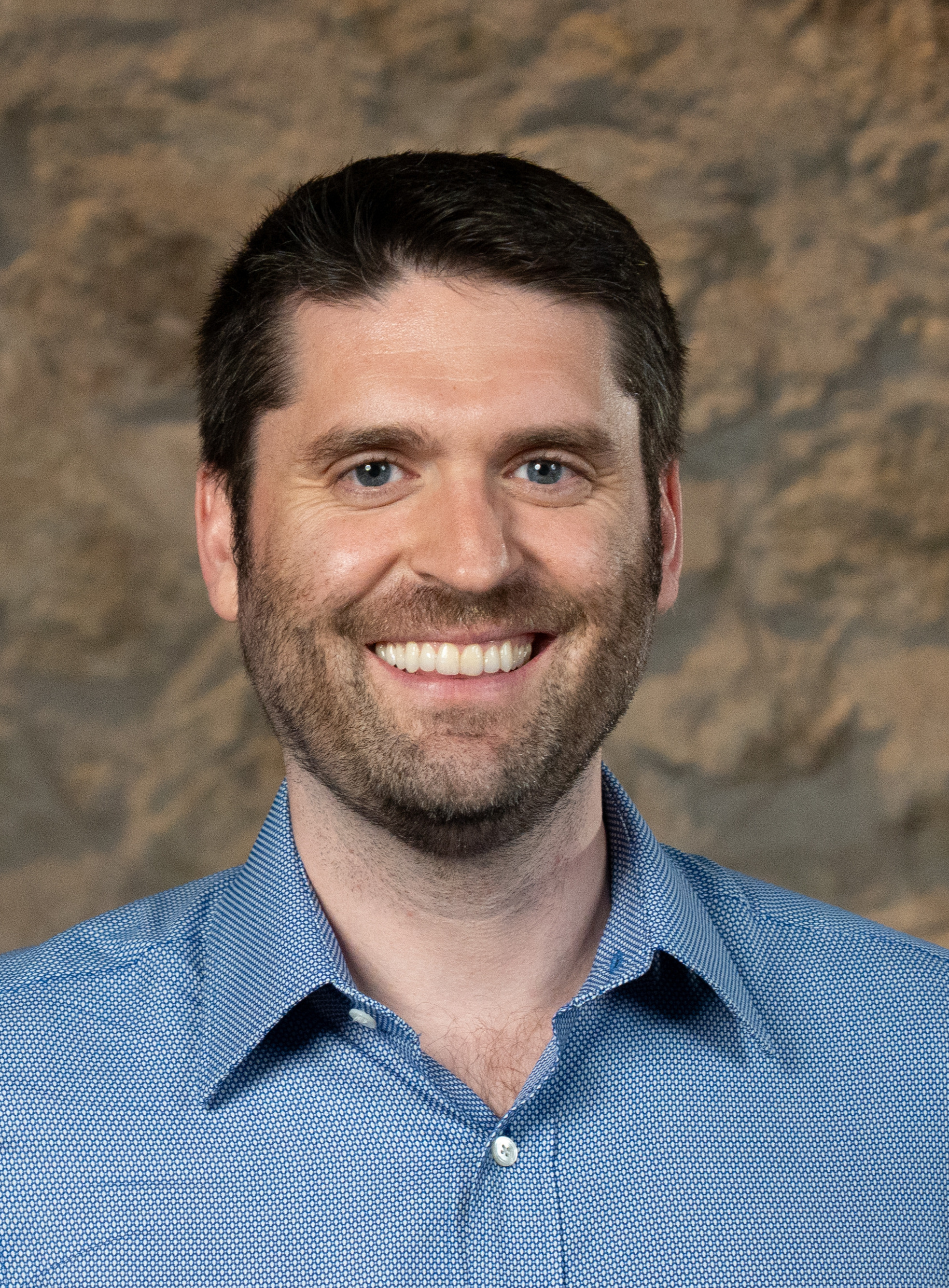
- Harrison in 2025
- Education: Washington University in St. Louis

Stephen B. Harrison is an American author, technology journalist, and technology transactions attorney. He writes the "Source Notes" column about Wikipedia and other internet issues, and has written extensively about the Wikipedia community in Slate and other publications. Harrison's debut novel, The Editors, was released in 2024.

== Education ==
Harrison grew up in Texas. He was educated at Washington University in St. Louis, where he had a Howard Nemerov writing scholarship. He received his Bachelor of Arts in 2009 and Juris Doctor in 2013.

== Career ==
Harrison was senior counsel for Thomson Reuters through 2021, and went on to work with the Federal Reserve Bank of Dallas. As of 2025, he works as a lawyer and journalist.

=== Journalism ===
In 2018, Harrison began publishing articles focused on technology and the media, often writing about the Wikipedia community. Before that, he had contributed articles on politics, culture, and society to Salon.com and HuffPost.

His first article on Wikipedia came about after an editor at The Outline suggested writing a literary critique of a Wikipedia article and examining how it developed behind the scenes. While riding the New York City Subway on a business trip, he got the idea to interview the two Wikipedia editors who had contributed the most to articles on the topic for The New York Times, who turned out to be teenagers. For another article in The Outline, "Grandpa Teaches Bitcoin", he interviewed the Wikipedia editor who had contributed most to the article about Bitcoin, who turned out not to own any Bitcoin. For The Washington Post, he interviewed the most prolific editor on English Wikipedia.

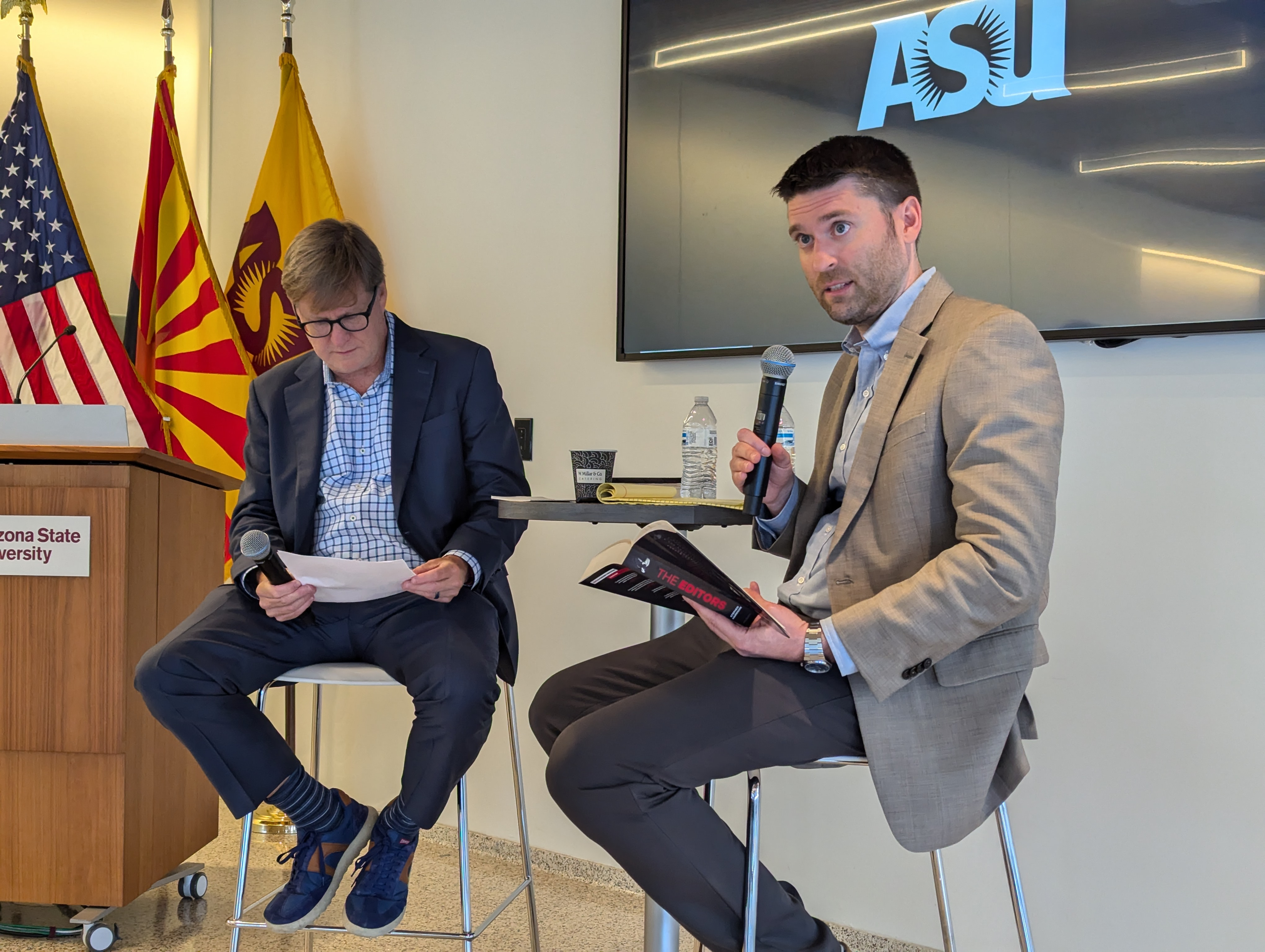
Harrison, right, gives an author talk on his novel The Editors at Arizona State University's Washington, D.C. center, sponsored by New America's Future Tense initiative. Harrison is being interviewed by Future Tense Editorial Director Andrés Martinez, left.

Starting in 2019, Harrison began writing regularly about "Wikipedia, digital knowledge, and the search for a fact-based world" in a bi-weekly column for Slate magazine called "Source Notes". He also publishes his own "Source Notes" newsletter. Other topics he covers include artificial intelligence (AI), information and disinformation, and books.

Harrison describes Wikipedia as: "essential infrastructure, almost like a utility that provides a trustworthy resource to the broader Internet.” He has also written articles on Wikipedia for Wired and The Guardian.

In September 2025, Harrison appeared on a WBUR-FM radio program titled: "The right wing is coming for Wikipedia," speaking with Meghna Chakrabarti, alongside Molly White, about the state of Wikipedia and the public criticisms of Wikipedia by the Republican Party during the second presidency of Donald Trump.

In October 2025, The Washington Post quoted Harrison in an article on Wikipedia, AI, and Grokipedia. Harrison explained that "every major AI system trains on Wikipedia’s freely licensed knowledge. The irony is that Grokipedia will be built on the unpaid labor of the volunteer Wikipedia editors Musk has gone out of his way to vilify." In November 2025, Marry Harris interviewed Harrison for Slate magazine discussing Harrison's opinions on Grokipedia.

=== The Editors ===
In 2024, Harrison released The Editors, a novel inspired by Wikipedia editors. It's a suspense novel about the company Infopendium, an "ubiquitous, crowd-sourced internet encyclopedia."

== Personal life ==
As of 2024, Harrison lives in Turtle Creek, Dallas.

== See also ==
- List of Wikipedia people

== Selected work ==
- Harrison, Stephen (March 28, 2018). If You See Something, Write Something The New York Times
- Harrison, Stephen. Benjakob, Omer. (October 15, 2020). From Anarchy to Wikiality, Glaring Bias to Good Cop: Press Coverage of Wikipedia’s First Two Decades, from Wikipedia @ 20 (2020)
- Harrison, Stephen (August 24, 2023). Wikipedia Will Survive A.I. Slate
- Harrison, Stephen (2024). The Editors. Inkshares. ISBN 978-1-950301-67-6.
