= Reading the Comments =

2015 book by Joseph Michael Reagle Jr.

Reading the Comments: Likers, Haters, and Manipulators at the Bottom of the Web
- Author: Joseph M. Reagle Jr.
- Language: English
- Subject: Internet comments
- Genre: Non-fiction
- Published: 2015
- Publisher: MIT Press
- Publication place: United States
- Media type: Print, e-book
- Pages: 240 pages
- ISBN: 978-0-262-02893-6
- Preceded by: Good Faith Collaboration

Reading the Comments: Likers, Haters, and Manipulators at the Bottom of the Web is a 2015 non-fiction book by Northeastern University professor Joseph M. Reagle Jr. The book was first published on April 24, 2015 through MIT Press and deals with the subject of Internet comments in locations like YouTube, Amazon, and forums.

== Synopsis ==
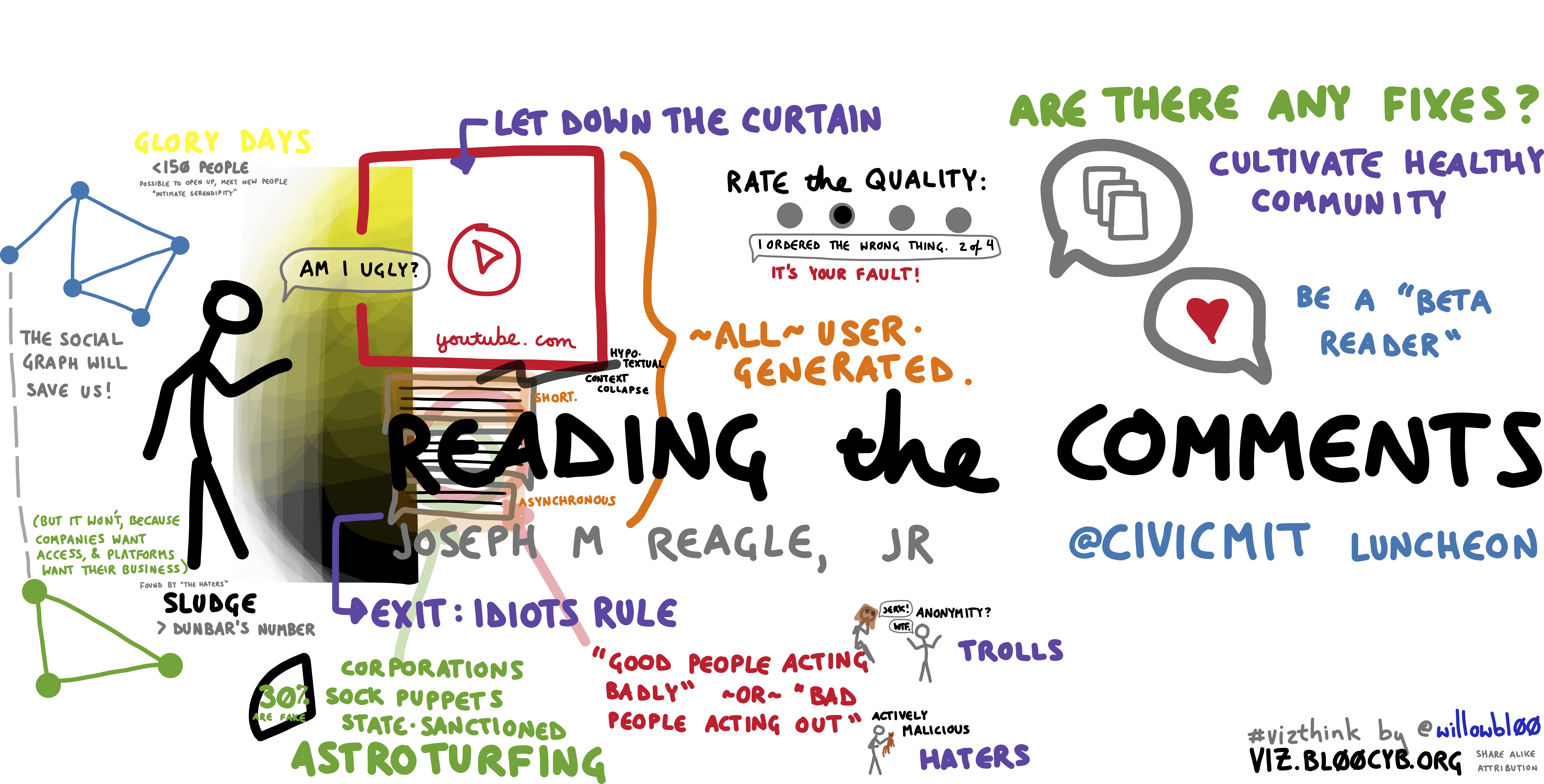
A graph describing the contents of the book

The book has eight chapters and gives an overview of comments on the Internet. Reagle covers the concept of Internet anonymity and references Plato's Ring of Gyges story, comparing the ring's power of invisibility to the ability to remain seemingly anonymous on the Internet. Topics covered in the book include the manipulation of online reviews in locations like Yelp, trolling, and online threats of rape and violence.

== Reception ==
Critical reception for Reading the Comments has been mixed. Much of the book's criticism centered on what the critics felt was a lack of depth and The New Yorker commented that this gave the book a "frustrating sense of missed opportunity, of mere comprehensiveness", particularly when covering the subjects of Donglegate and Anita Sarkeesian's Tropes vs. Women in Video Games. The Spectator gave an overall favorable opinion of Reading the Comments, praising Reagle for his observation skills.
