= The Last Best Place on the Internet =

2026 nonfiction book by Richard Cooke

- First edition UK cover
- Author: Richard Cooke
- Language: English
- Subject: History of Wikipedia
- Genre: Non-fiction
- Publisher: Black Inc. (Australia); W. W. Norton & Company (North America); Granta Books (UK)
- Publication date: 13 October 2026 (North America/Australia); 5 November 2026 (UK)
- Pages: 320 (North America/UK); 304 (Australia)
- ISBN: 978-0-393-88188-2

The Last Best Place on the Internet: A Human History of Wikipedia is a book by Richard Cooke, an Australian journalist, published in 2026, the 25th year of Wikipedia. The book presents a history of Wikipedia and Wikipedians—the volunteers who edit and maintain the website. It also discusses the various threats facing Wikipedia, among them, "edit wars" over politically charged topics, the loss of editors, and declining readership due to the rise of artificial intelligence (AI).

== Background ==
Richard Cooke coined the phrase "The Last Best Place on the Internet" in reference to Wikipedia in a 2020 essay he wrote for Wired magazine. He was then contracted to expand the essay into a book on the history of Wikipedia. Due to the COVID-19 pandemic, Cooke's deadline was extended and he conducted hundreds of hours of research, primarily on the English-language edition of Wikipedia. The book was originally to be structured like a Wikipedia article, but Cooke's editor convinced him to abandon this in place of a less rigid style.

== Release ==
The Last Best Place on the Internet: A Human History of Wikipedia was published on 13 October 2026 by Black Inc. in Australia. W. W. Norton & Company published the book on the same date in North America, and have worldwide rights for distribution in China, Singapore and Malaysia.

Granta Books published the book in the UK and the Commonwealth of Nations (except Australia and Canada) on 5 November 2026.

== Reception ==
Library Journal described the book as a thorough account of Wikipedia's origins, evolution, and cultural impact. They concluded that the book was an "eye-opening, and entertaining survey of the weird and wonderful world of Wikipedia". The Publishers Weekly deemed the book a "freewheeling history" that did not avoid discussing the challenges and weaknesses of Wikipedia.

The Guardian complimented Cooke for publishing a "very funny and deeply researched book... packed with hilarious and heartwarming stories". The New York Times called the book a "wry and readable" account of the human story behind Wikipedia, but one that did not include an excessive amount of details that would distract the reader from the bigger picture. The Economist praised the book as "an enjoyable rabbit hole" of interesting information, just like Wikipedia itself, providing an "affectionate portrait" of the people who made the online encyclopedia what it is. The magazine predicted that a collaborative project on the scale of Wikipedia would likely never happen again. In their review, Bloomberg wrote the book shines a light on Wikipedia contributors to correct perceptions of how and by whom the articles are authored. Richard King wrote in The Saturday Paper the book was "an elegy" from a bygone period of history, noting AI's impact on Wikipedia.

The Daily Telegraph gives two examples of Wikipedia arcana: the 60,000-word entry on tartan ("as densely woven as its subject matter") and the article Embanking of the tidal Thames, "which resembles a historical epic".

Kirkus Reviews wrote that while Cooke's book was insightful in its telling of Wikipedia's history, it also revealed how Wikipedia was being threatened and weaponised, while detailing the growing threat of AI to the encyclopedia. They called it "a winning work of cultural criticism". Our Culture magazine listed the book as one of their most anticipated books of Fall 2026. It appeared on similar lists by Cultured and Literary Hub, which also published an extract from the book.

== See also ==
- History of Wikipedia
- Bibliography of Wikipedia
