= Wikipedia and the Representation of Reality =

2021 book about Wikipedia

- Author: Matthew Vetter and Zachary McDowell
- Subject: Wikipedia
- Published: 2021 (Routledge)
- Pages: 140
- ISBN: 9781003094081

Wikipedia and the Representation of Reality is a 2021 book by Matthew Vetter and Zachary McDowell. It summarizes major conflicts on the English Wikipedia and practice of Wikipedia policy.

== Summary ==
The book has five chapters. Thematically, it discusses controversies of the English Wikipedia, the assessment of what constitutes a reliable source, how the website mitigates the impact of disruptive edits, and gender inequities in secondary sources affecting whether certain subjects are deemed notable on Wikipedia.

== Reception ==
Wikipedia and the Representation of Reality was described as a useful resource in Global Media and Communication. A review published by the International Journal of Communication stated that "McDowell and Vetter add to this growing bibliography of Wikipedia research, distinguishing themselves with a focus on the particular ways the site fails its ambitions".

== See also ==
- Bibliography of Wikipedia
