= You Could Look It Up =

Book of essays on the history of reference works by Jack Lynch

- Author: Jack Lynch
- Published: 2016 (Bloomsbury Press)
- Pages: 464
- ISBN: 978-0-8027-7752-2 (Hardcover)

You Could Look It Up is a book of essays on the history of reference works by Rutgers University English professor Jack Lynch.

== Summary ==
The book opens with the earliest written works such as the Code of Hammurabi and how they describe the values of the societies in which they were written. An overview of the history of reading is provided, as well as the contrast between intensive reading out of scarcity and "defensive reading" in times of information overload.

The advent of dictonaries led to detailed reference works that overlap with the concept of a modern encyclopedia. Authors originally tried organizing content thematically, but arranging text in alphabetical order became more commonplace in the 1600s and eventually became the standard form of organization. The book also describes other ways of organizing information such as cartography and astronomical star catalogues.

== See also ==
- Bibliography of Wikipedia
