= Wikipedia – The Missing Manual =

2008 book by John Broughton

Wikipedia: The Missing Manual
- Author: John Broughton
- Language: English
- Series: The Missing Manuals
- Subject: Wikipedia
- Genre: How to
- Publisher: O'Reilly Media
- Publication date: 2008
- Publication place: United States
- Media type: paperback
- ISBN: 0-596-51516-2
- OCLC: 191883897
- LC Class: TK5105.8882.W54 B76 2008

Wikipedia: The Missing Manual is a 2008 book by John Broughton. It is a how-to guide that explains the process of contributing to Wikipedia, an online encyclopedia.

Wikipedia: The Missing Manual is part of O'Reilly Media's Missing Manual series.

== Release ==
On January 26, 2009, O'Reilly announced that the content of the book was being released under a free license compatible with Wikipedia and that it would be available for editing in the Help area of Wikipedia. The book was released as part of O'Reilly Media's Missing Manual series which was created by David Pogue, technology columnist for The New York Times and Scientific American.

== Spin-off ==
The book has a spin-off, Wikipedia Reader's Guide: The Missing Manual, consisting of an expanded version of Appendix B and Chapter 1 from the book.

== Reception ==
"For anyone who is interested in becoming part of the noble experiment, this book is an excellent introduction," wrote reviewer Robert Slade.

== Publications ==
- John Broughton (2008). Wikipedia: The Missing Manual. O'Reilly Media, Inc. ISBN 978-0-596-51516-4.
- John Broughton (2008). Wikipedia Reader's Guide: The Missing Manual. O'Reilly Media, Inc. ISBN 978-0-596-52174-5.

== See also ==
- Help: Wikipedia: The Missing Manual: Text as incorporated into Wikipedia's help pages
- How Wikipedia Works
- Bibliography of Wikipedia
- State Library of Queensland's Exploring Wikipedia Content Creation Training Manual at Wikimedia Commons
