= The Wikipedia Revolution =

2009 popular history book by Andrew Lih

The Wikipedia Revolution: How a Bunch of Nobodies Created the World's Greatest Encyclopedia
- First edition cover
- Author: Andrew Lih
- Language: English
- Subject: Wikipedia
- Genre: Nonfiction
- Publisher: Hyperion (US version); Aurum Press (UK version)
- Publication date: March 17, 2009
- Publication place: United States
- ISBN: 978-1-4013-0371-6
- OCLC: 232977686
- Dewey Decimal: 031 22
- LC Class: ZA4482 .L54 2009

The Wikipedia Revolution: How a Bunch of Nobodies Created the World's Greatest Encyclopedia is a 2009 popular history book by new media researcher and writer Andrew Lih.

It covers the period from Wikipedia's founding in early 2001 up to early 2008. Written as a popular history, the text ranges from short biographies of Jimmy Wales, Larry Sanger and Ward Cunningham, to brief accounts of infamous events in Wikipedia's history such as the Essjay controversy and the Seigenthaler incident.

Lih describes the importance of early influences on Wikipedia including Usenet, HyperCard, Slashdot, and MeatballWiki. He also explores the cultural differences found within sister projects such as the German Wikipedia, the Chinese Wikipedia, and the Japanese Wikipedia. The book also covers the Citizendium project, originally a fork of Wikipedia by co-founder Larry Sanger.

== Points ==
Since its founding, Wikipedia grew quickly. As of 2009, more than half of Wikipedia's traffic came from Google. As Lih says, by 2003,

The English edition had more than 100,000 articles, putting it on par with commercial online encyclopedias. It was clear Wikipedia had joined the big leagues.

Lih explains that

Wikipedia became an instant phenomenon because of both supply and demand. . . . Balanced and reliable content is a rare commodity, in high demand. The Internet has a deep supply of volunteers willing to share a deep pool of knowledge, but they are widely dispersed geographically and logistically. Provide an online agora for these two elements to come together, and you have Wikipedia.

Founder Wales has said that, "We make the Internet not suck." Still Lih says that some "pranksters" insert "sophomoric chunks of text."

== Reception ==
According to The Wall Street Journal,

Until just a couple of years ago, the largest reference work ever published was something called the Yongle Encyclopedia. A vast project consisting of thousands of volumes, it brought together the knowledge of some 2,000 scholars and was published, in China, in 1408. Roughly 600 years later, Wikipedia surpassed its size and scope with fewer than 25 employees and no official editor.

The Wall Street Journal also says Lih's book is somewhat like Wikipedia itself.

The Telegraph said that the author "conveys a vivid sense of Wikipedian talent and provides a useful primer on the computing culture that gave it birth."

== Publication ==
- Lih, Andrew (March 17, 2009). The Wikipedia Revolution: How a Bunch of Nobodies Created the World's Greatest Encyclopedia. Hyperion. ISBN 978-1-4013-0371-6.
- Lih, Andrew (March 19, 2009). The Wikipedia Revolution: How a Bunch of Nobodies Created the World's Greatest Encyclopedia. Aurum. ISBN 978-1-84513-473-0.

== See also ==
- Bibliography of Wikipedia
- History of Wikipedia
