= Wikipedia-based education =

Integration of Wikipedia into educational settings

Wikipedia-based education refers to the integration of Wikipedia and other Wikimedia projects into educational settings, where students and educators use these platforms for learning, teaching, and knowledge creation. It is practiced at both the secondary and postsecondary levels. This approach leverages Wikipedia's vast repository of information and collaborative nature to enhance educational experiences. As an encyclopedia, Wikipedia can be used as an open educational resource (OER). Additionally, because the website invites participation by its users, it can also serve as an open educational practice.

Wikipedia is one of the largest and most popular educational websites globally, with over 53 million articles in nearly 300 languages. It serves as a valuable resource for a wide range of topics, from science and history to current events. The Wikimedia Foundation supports educational initiatives that encourage the use of Wikipedia and other Wikimedia projects in classrooms and beyond.

According to a number of researchers, Wikipedia-based education offers unique learning benefits, including the development of digital literacy, critical thinking, and collaboration skills. Students enhance their writing and research abilities by contributing to Wikipedia, while also learning to evaluate the reliability of online sources. Furthermore, interacting with Wikipedia as a complex discourse community emphasizes the process through which knowledge is proposed, negotiated, and revised based on user interactions. Wikipedia's unique contributions to knowledge production lie in its collaborative, social practices, where content is generated and interrogated without a controlling editorial staff. This environment fosters critical literacy and active participation, making it a valuable tool for developing skills necessary for navigating open access content in digital spaces. Students are motivated, when editing Wikipedia articles, furthermore, by the opportunity to write for a more public audience.

== See also ==
- Wiki Education Foundation
