= José van Dijck =

Dutch new media author (born 1960)

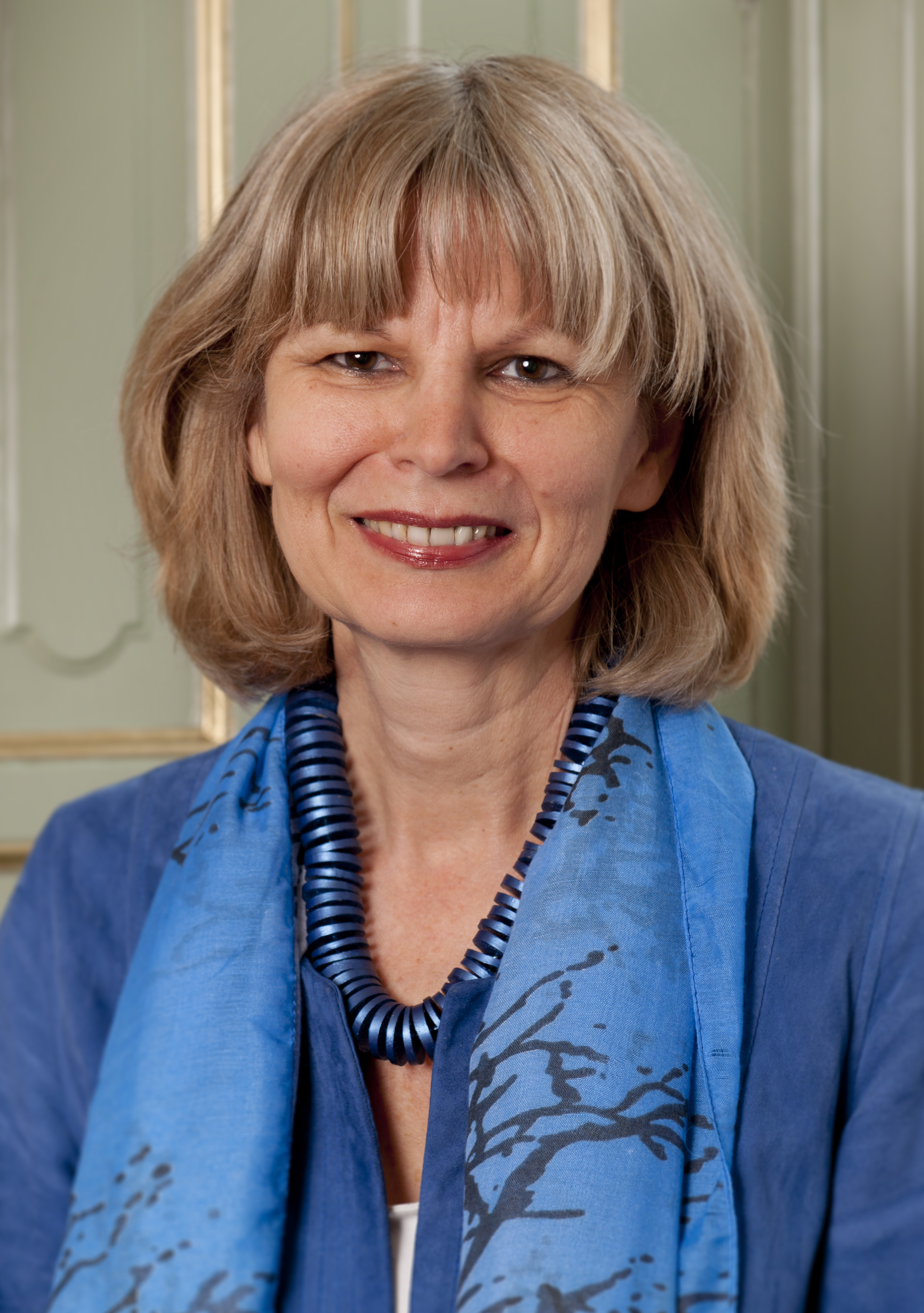
- Born: Johanna Francisca Theodora Maria van Dijck; November 15, 1960 (age 65); Boxtel, Netherlands
- Occupations: New media author and university professor
- Known for: President, Royal Netherlands Academy of Arts and Sciences (2015–2018)
- Awards: Spinoza Prize (2021)

Academic background
- Education: Utrecht University, University of California

Academic work
- Discipline: Media studies
- Institutions: University of Amsterdam
- Notable works: The Culture of Connectivity

Johanna Francisca Theodora Maria "José" van Dijck (born 15 November 1960, in Boxtel) is a new media author and a distinguished university professor in media and digital society at Utrecht University since 2017. From 2001 to 2016, she was a professor of Comparative Media Studies where she was the former chair of the Department of Media Studies and former dean of the Faculty of Humanities at the University of Amsterdam. She is the author of ten (co-)authored and (co-)edited books including Mediated Memory in the Digital Age; The Culture of Connectivity; and The Platform Society. Public Values in a Connective World. Her work has been translated into many languages and distributed to a worldwide audience.

Since 2010, Van Dijck has been a member of the Royal Netherlands Academy of Arts and Sciences. In 2015, she was elected by Academy members as the president of the organisation and became the first woman to hold the position.

In 2016, Dutch magazine Opzij named Van Dijck the most influential Dutch woman of 2016.

In 2019, Lund University awarded Van Dijick an honorary doctorate for her scientific merits and contributions to the social aspects of digitalisation.

In 2024, she received an honorary doctoral degree from the University of Oslo.

== Early life and education ==
Johanna Francisca Theodora Maria van Dijck was born in Boxtel, Netherlands.

She attended and graduated from Utrecht University with a BA and MA in 1985. She later graduated with a Ph.D of Comparative Literature at the University of California, San Diego, in 1992.

== Notable works ==
Van Dijck published her first book Manufacturing Babies and Public Consent: Debating the New Reproductive Technologies in 1995. It talks about the growing discussions from activists and scholars regarding the new developments of technology involving reproductivity. Van Dijck draws from scientific articles, fiction and studies to reconstruct the debate.

Other notable works include "Users like you? Theorizing agency in user-generated content", which focuses on the idea of "you" – a metaphor for the millions of anonymous contributors to the web, as well as how this existence affects the generation and circulation of content. In her article, Van Dijck argues for the articulation of user agency as a complex concept that involves not only the facilitation of engagement and participation, but the economic value of both the consumer and provider, something she believes major composite site companies such as Google should attempt to create models to understand.

== Publications (selected) ==
- José van Dijck, J. (2009). "Users like you? Theorizing agency in user-generated content". Media, Culture & Society, 31(1), pp. 41–58. 10.1177/0163443708098245
- José van Dijck, Thomas Poell & Martijn de Waal, The Platform Society. Public Values in a Connective World. Oxford University Press, 2018. ISBN 978-0-19-088977-7
- José van Dijck: The Culture of Connectivity: A critical history of social media. New York: Oxford University Press, 2013. ISBN 978-0-19-997077-3
- Sound souvenirs. Audio technologies, memory and cultural practices. Edited by Karin Bijsterveld & José van Dijck. Amsterdam: Amsterdam University Press, 2009. ISBN 978-90-8964-132-8
- José van Dijck: Mediated memories in the digital age. Stanford, CA: Stanford University Press, 2007. ISBN 0-8047-5624-4
- José van Dijck: The transparent body. A cultural analysis of medical imaging. Seattle: University of Washington Press, 2005. ISBN 0-295-98490-2
- José van Dijck: Manufacturing Babies and Public Consent. Debating the New Reproductive Technologies. New York: New York University Press, 1995. ISBN 978-03-3362-965-9
- José van Dijck: Discontinuous discourses. Mapping the public debate on new reproductive technologies, 1978-1991. Thesis (Ph. D.), University of California, San Diego, Department of Literature, 1992. No ISBN
- José van Dijck profile, University of Amsterdam: "José van Dijck, Prof. Dr.".

== See also ==
- Connectivity of social media
