= Andrew Lih =

American researcher, consultant and writer (born 1968)

- 郦安治
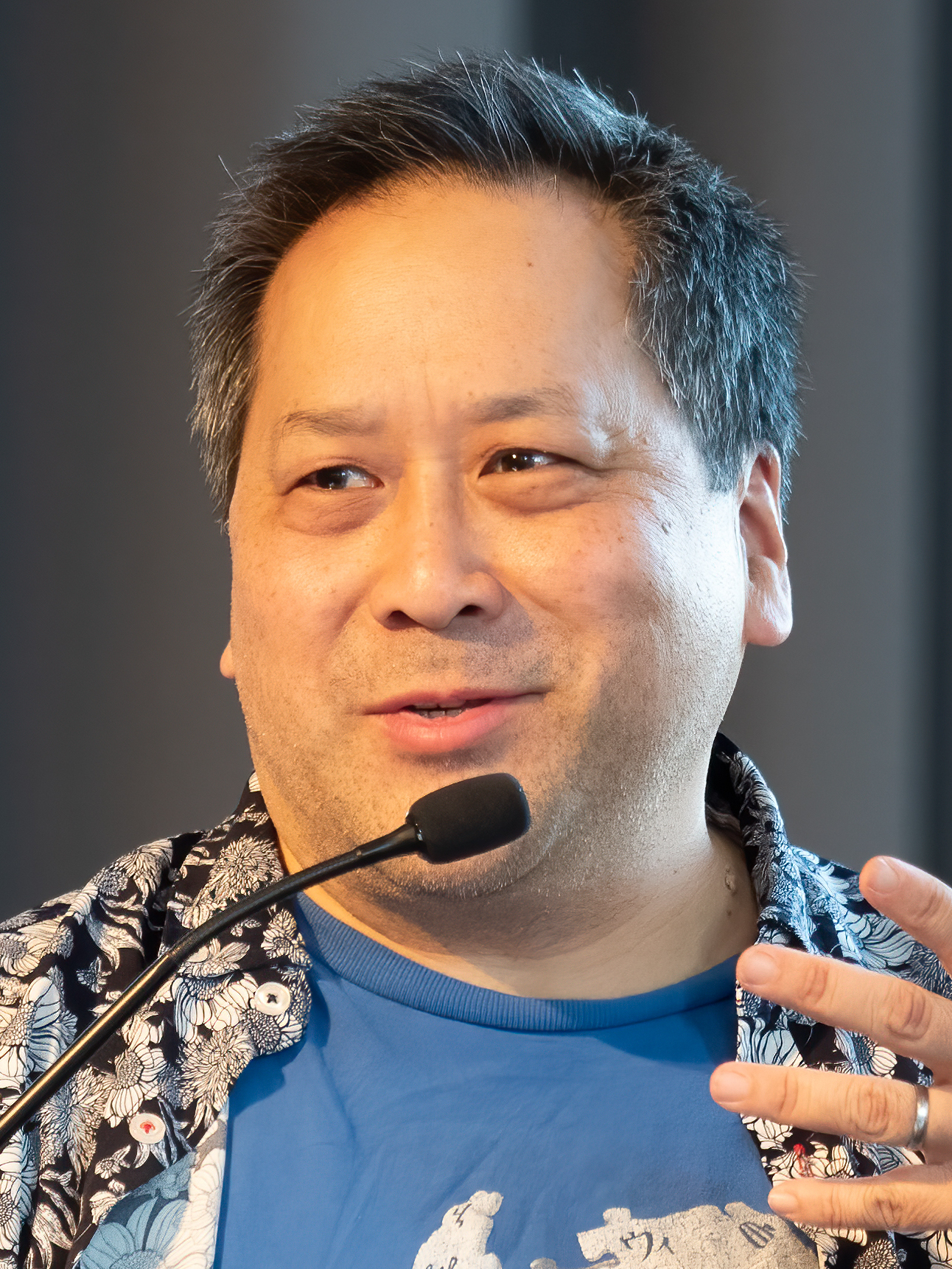
- Lih in 2024
- Born: 1968 (age 57–58); Washington, D.C., United States
- Other name: Fuzheado
- Education: Columbia University (BS, MS)
- Occupations: Scientist; professor
- Known for: Studying various open technology cultures, such as Wikipedia and Wikimedia
- Relatives: Katherine Young (grandmother)
- Lih's voice Recorded May 2017

Andrew Lih
- Traditional Chinese: 酈安治
- Simplified Chinese: 郦安治
Transcriptions
Standard Mandarin
- Hanyu Pinyin: Lì Ānzhì
- Gwoyeu Romatzyh: Lih Anjyh
- Wade–Giles: Li^{4} An^{1} chih^{4}
- Tongyong Pinyin: Lì Ānjhìh
- IPA: [lí án.ʈʂî]
- Website: www.andrewlih.com

Andrew Lih (simplified Chinese: 郦安治; traditional Chinese: 酈安治; pinyin: Lì Ānzhì; born 1968) is an American new media researcher, consultant and writer, as well as an authority on both Wikipedia and internet censorship in the People's Republic of China. In 2013, he was appointed an associate professor of journalism at American University in Washington, D.C.

He is currently Wikimedian at large at the Smithsonian Institution and Wikimedia Strategist at The Metropolitan Museum of Art in New York City.

== Life and career ==
Lih worked as a software engineer for AT&T Bell Labs from 1990 to 1993. He founded the new-media startup Mediabridge Infosystems, Inc., in 1994. He also obtained a master's degree in computer science from Columbia University in 1994.

From 1995 to 2000 he served as an adjunct professor of journalism at Columbia, and director of technology for their Center for New Media. In 2000, he formed Columbia's Interactive Design Lab, a collaboration with the university's School of the Arts to explore interactive design for both fiction and non-fiction, including advertising, news, documentaries and films. Soon afterward, Lih served as an assistant professor and the Director of Technology at the Journalism and Media Studies Centre of the University of Hong Kong.

Lih then moved to Beijing, China, where he lived until 2009. In 2013, he became an associate professor at American University's School of Communication in Washington, D.C.

== Wikipedia activity ==
Lih is a Wikipedia contributor and former administrator on the English Wikipedia. In 2009, he published the book The Wikipedia Revolution: How a Bunch of Nobodies Created the World's Greatest Encyclopedia. Lih has been interviewed by Salon.com, The New York Times Freakonomics blog, and NPR Talk of the Nation as an expert on Wikipedia. Lih has stated that editing Wikipedia with smartphones is difficult, hence discouraging new potential contributors. He also says that for several years running, the number of Wikipedia editors has been falling and that there is serious disagreement among existing contributors on how to resolve this. In 2015, Lih expressed fear that these situations could imperil Wikipedia's long-term future.

In 2022, Lih was named a Wikimedia Laureate. In 2025, while attending WikiConference North America in New York as a Trust and Safety volunteer, Lih pried away a loaded gun from an armed man, Connor Weston, who walked onto the stage soon after Maryana Iskander began speaking and after Richard Knipel, another volunteer, had grabbed Weston from behind.

== Selected publications ==
- Lih, Andrew (2009). The Wikipedia Revolution. New York: Hyperion. ISBN 978-1-4013-0371-6. OCLC 232977686.

== See also ==
- List of Wikipedia people
