= Wikipedia – A New Community of Practice? =

2009 book by Dan O'Sullivan

- Author: Dan O'Sullivan
- Publisher: Ashgate Publishing
- Publication date: 2009
- ISBN: 9780754674337

Wikipedia: A New Community of Practice? is a 2009 book by British historian Dan O'Sullivan, published by Ashgate Publishing. The book takes an academic approach to Wikipedia, applying the ideas of theorists like Jürgen Habermas, Michael Warner, and Roland Barthes.

== Contents ==
O'Sullivan begins with an overview of group theory, and explores several groups he sees to be precursors to Wikipedia: the Library of Alexandria, the British Royal Society, the French Republic of Letters (focusing on Denis Diderot and the Encyclopédie), the Oxford English Dictionary, and the Left Book Club, a mid-century British communist publishing collective. For each group, O'Sullivan discusses the group's aims; its community and make-up; its costs of doing business (transaction costs); its relations with the public; and its legacy.

The second part of the book applies the group theory approach to Wikipedia, devoting a chapter to each aspect. Chapter 10, on the structure of Wikipedia, explains the use of "talk pages" and featured articles. Chapter 13, "Wikipedia and the Nature of Knowledge," explores the question of expertise. In this chapter O'Sullivan claims a fundamental disagreement between Wikipedia's two founders, Jimmy Wales and Larry Sanger. While Wales, an admirer of the economist Friedrich Hayek, believed in the wisdom of crowds and that Wikipedia would eventually converge to ideal pages, Sanger believed in the necessity of experts to ensure quality content. O'Sullivan puts Wikipedia in the context of philosophical debates about expertise and elitism.

The third and final part of the book explains how to use Wikipedia. O'Sullivan includes chapters on browsing and editing, and his longest chapter provides a 10-point schema to assess the value of Wikipedia articles. He uses the article on the Great Fire of London as an example, and a significant portion of the chapter reproduces earlier versions of it.

== Reviews ==
The book was reviewed in the academic journals Libraries and the Academy and Library Review, as well as in Wikipedia's community-written newspaper The Signpost.

== See also ==
- Bibliography of Wikipedia

== Literature ==
- Chandler M. Armstrong. Dan O’Sullivan, Wikipedia: A New Community of Practice?, Farnham: Ashgate, 2009; 191 pp.: ISBN 9780754674337, £45.00 // International Sociology, Volume: 26, issue: 5, page(s): 652–655, September 1, 2011; doi:10.1177/02685809110260050803.
- Colin Higgins. Book review: Wikipedia: A New Community of Practice? Dan O’Sullivan. Farnham, Surrey: Ashgate, 2009. 191pp, £40.00. ISBN 9780754674337 // Journal of Librarianship and Information Science, Vol 42, Issue 4, pp. 279–280; doi:10.1177/0961000610386667.
