= Joseph Reagle =

American academic and writer (born 1972)

Joseph M. Reagle Jr.
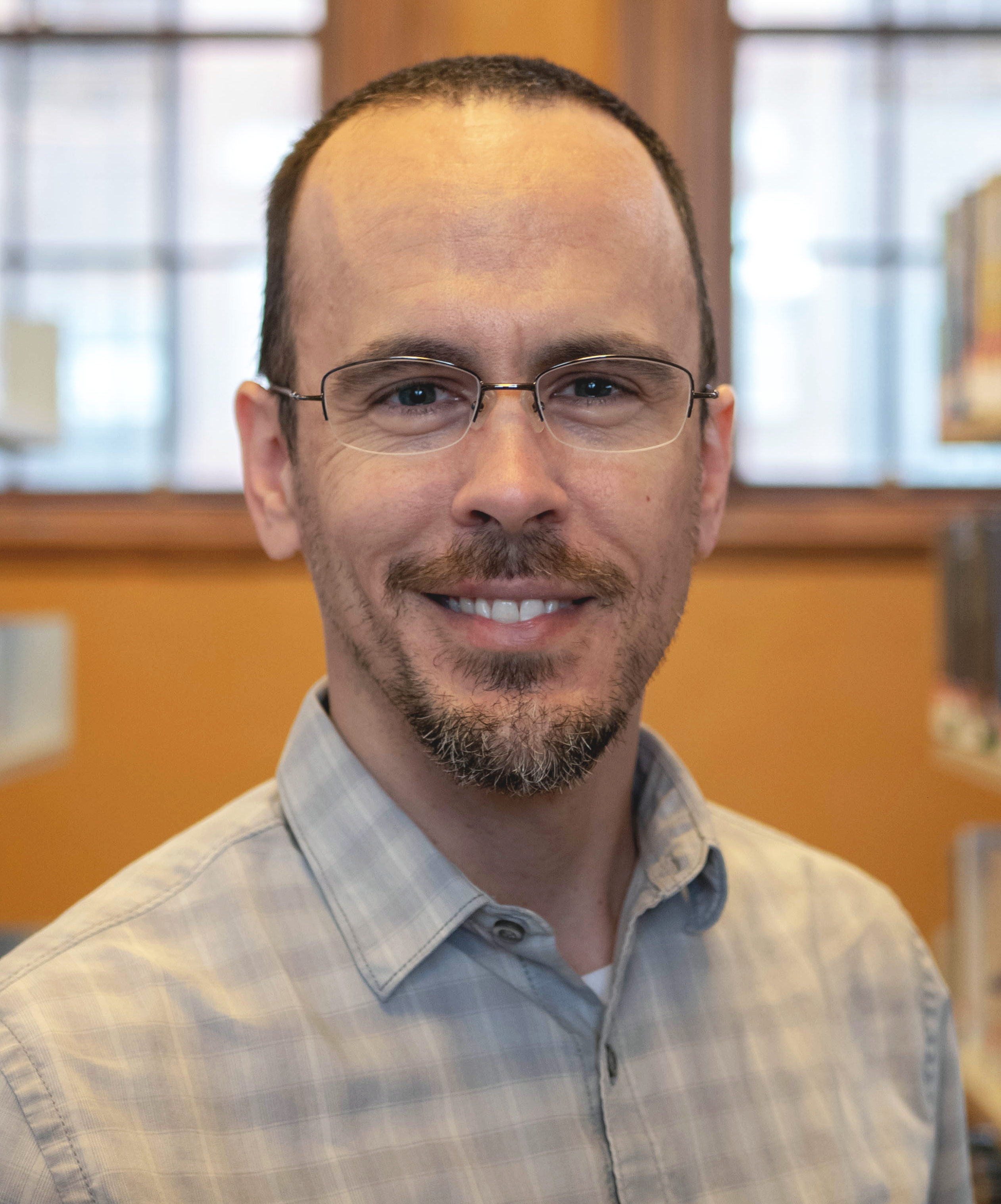
- Reagle in 2019
- Born: Joseph Michael Reagle Jr. 1972 (age 52–53)
- Education: University of Maryland, Baltimore County (BS); Massachusetts Institute of Technology (MS); New York University (PhD)
- Occupation(s): Professor, writer
- Years active: 1996–present
- Known for: Internet studies
- Notable work: Good Faith Collaboration (2010)
- Awards: TR35 (2002)
- Scientific career
- Fields: Mass communications
- Institutions: Northeastern University
- Thesis: In good faith: Wikipedia collaboration and the pursuit of the universal encyclopedia (2008)
- Doctoral advisor: Helen Nissenbaum
- Website: reagle.org/joseph/

Joseph Michael Reagle Jr. (born 1972) is an American academic and writer focused on digital technology and culture, including Wikipedia, online comments, geek feminism, and life hacking. He is an associate professor of communication studies at Northeastern University. He was an early member of the World Wide Web Consortium, based at the Massachusetts Institute of Technology, and in 1998 and 2010 he was a fellow at Harvard University's Berkman Klein Center for Internet & Society.

== Education ==
Reagle received an undergraduate degree in computer science and a minor in history from the University of Maryland, Baltimore County. He then enrolled in the Technology Policy Program at the Massachusetts Institute of Technology and wrote a masters thesis on trust and cryptographic financial instruments. He returned to MIT as a research engineer, and also served as a fellow at the Berkman Klein Center for Internet and Society at Harvard University. He returned to schooling at New York University, where he taught, and earned a PhD in 2008 with a thesis about the history and collaborative culture of Wikipedia, supervised by Helen Nissenbaum.

== Career and research ==
Reagle was a member of the World Wide Web Consortium from 1996 to 2003. There he worked on issues such as intellectual property and privacy.

In 2002, he was listed as one of MIT Technology Review's TR35, a list of the world's top innovators under the age of 35.

In 2010, he reconstructed the first ten thousand contributions to Wikipedia from a previously lost data dump as a simple website. In 2011, Reagle published a journal article with Lauren Rhue that examined gender bias in Wikipedia, using gendered pronouns to detect articles about women and comparing and contrasting their findings against female coverage in other encyclopedias. The article concluded "that Wikipedia provides better coverage and longer articles, that Wikipedia typically has more articles on women than Britannica in absolute terms, but Wikipedia articles on women are more likely to be missing than articles on men relative to Britannica".

Reagle is a supporter of open access and all of his books are available online.

== Selected publications ==
- Reagle, Joseph (2010). Good Faith Collaboration: The Culture of Wikipedia. History and Foundations of Information Science. Cambridge, MA: MIT Press. ISBN 978-0262518208. JSTOR j.ctt5hhhnf. OCLC 496282188.
- Reagle, Joseph (2015). Reading the Comments: Likers, Haters, and Manipulators at the Bottom of the Web. Cambridge, MA: MIT Press. doi:10.7551/mitpress/10116.001.0001. ISBN 9780262028936. JSTOR j.ctt17kkb2f. OCLC 891941812.
- Reagle, Joseph; Koerner, Jackie, eds. (2020). Wikipedia @ 20: Stories of an Incomplete Revolution. Cambridge, MA: MIT Press. ISBN 9780262538176. OCLC 1150825819.
