= Danny O'Sullivan (Australian rules footballer) =

Australian rules footballer

Personal information
- Full name: Danny O'Sullivan
- Born: 16 August 1952 (age 74)
- Original team: Reservoir Old Boys
- Height: 173 cm (5 ft 8 in)
- Weight: 68 kg (150 lb)

Playing career^{1}
Years	Club	Games (Goals)
1973	Collingwood	7 (0)
- ^{1} Playing statistics correct to the end of 1973.

Danny O'Sullivan (born 16 August 1952) is a former Australian rules footballer who played with Collingwood in the Victorian Football League (VFL).
