= PediaPress =

German software development and print-on-demand company

- Founded: 2007; 19 years ago
- Headquarters: Mainz, Germany
- Website: pediapress.com

PediaPress GmbH is a software development and print-on-demand company located in Mainz, Germany. The company is a spin-off of Brainbot Technologies AG.

It allows users to create customized books from wiki content using an automated PDF file builder and print-on-demand (PoD) technology.

PediaPress maintains that it is not a publisher and does not review the content of any printed books or other works offered through its tools but may remove content it deems to be illegal or inappropriate.

PediaPress and the Wikimedia Foundation became partners in December 2007, and a proportion of the sales income of each book is donated to the foundation.

== Origins ==
PediaPress was established in July 2007 to provide an online service that enabled Web users to create customized books from wiki content using direct web-to-print technology.

Users were able to use the Wikipedia Book Creator tool to arrange the order of the articles and specify the cover details. The price of each unique book depended on the number of pages. Books were ready for shipment within a few working days.

PediaPress and the Wikimedia Foundation became partners in December 2007. PediaPress's software was initially integrated into Wikipedia, and made accessible in the navigation sidebar of every page via a "create a book" button. PediaPress had contracted with Lightning Source, a subsidiary of Ingram Industries, to print the books. PediaPress established a long-term partnership with the Wikimedia Foundation. A portion of the proceeds of each book was donated to the Wikimedia Foundation to support their mission.

Initially, the ability to create books from the English version of Wikipedia was exclusive to signed in users, because of scalability issues. But later, anyone could create books from any of the millions of articles on Wikipedia in English alone.
