= Michael Mandiberg =

American artist (born 1977)

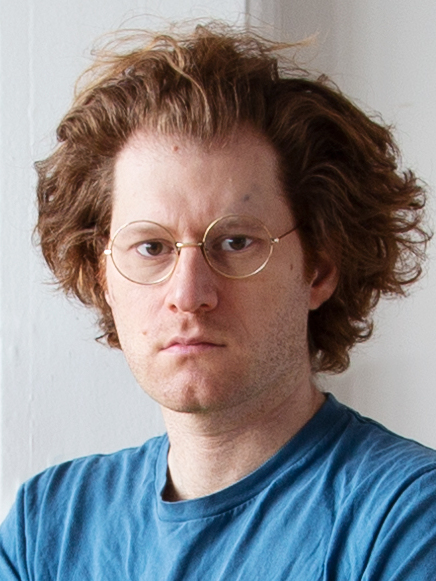
- Mandiberg in December 2019
- Born: December 22, 1977 (age 48); Detroit, Michigan, U.S.
- Education: Brown University; Rhode Island School of Design; California Institute of the Arts
- Known for: Internet art
- Notable work: Shop Mandiberg, The Red Project, Oil Standard, The Real Costs
- Awards: Turbulence Project Award, Rhizome Commission, 2007–08 Eyebeam Fellowship, 2008–09 Eyebeam Senior Fellow
- Mandiberg's voice recorded October 2017

Michael Mandiberg (born December 22, 1977) is an American artist, programmer, designer and educator.

Mandiberg's works have been exhibited at venues including the New Museum for Contemporary Art, New York City; the transmediale festival, Berlin; the Center for Art and Media Karlsruhe (ZKM) in Karlsruhe, Germany; and the Ars Electronica Center located in Linz, Austria. Mandiberg's work has also been featured in books like Tribe and Jana's New Media Art, Greene's Internet Art, and Blais and Ippolito's At the Edge of Art. Mandiberg has been written about in The New York Times, Los Angeles Times, the Berliner Zeitung, and Wired.

== Career ==
Print Wikipedia

Mandiberg is working as professor in the College of Staten Island on media culture. and a Fellow at Eyebeam in New York City.

Mandiberg is the writer of Digital Foundations, a book which teaches the Bauhaus Basic Course through design software. This work received praise from creatives such as Ellen Lupton and C. E. B. Reas. Mandiberg is a writer for Digital Foundations and Anti-Advertising Agency blogs.

Mandiberg founded New York Arts Practicum, "a summer arts institute where participants experientially learn to bridge their lives as art students into lives as artists in the world." Mandiberg also convened the event Experiments in Extra-Institutional Education at City University of New York on April 11, 2013, which led to a special issue of the academic journal Social Text and a yearlong seminar on similar topics co-organized with Carla Herrera-Prats, Cynthia Lawson Jaramillo, and Jennifer Stoops.

== Notable works ==
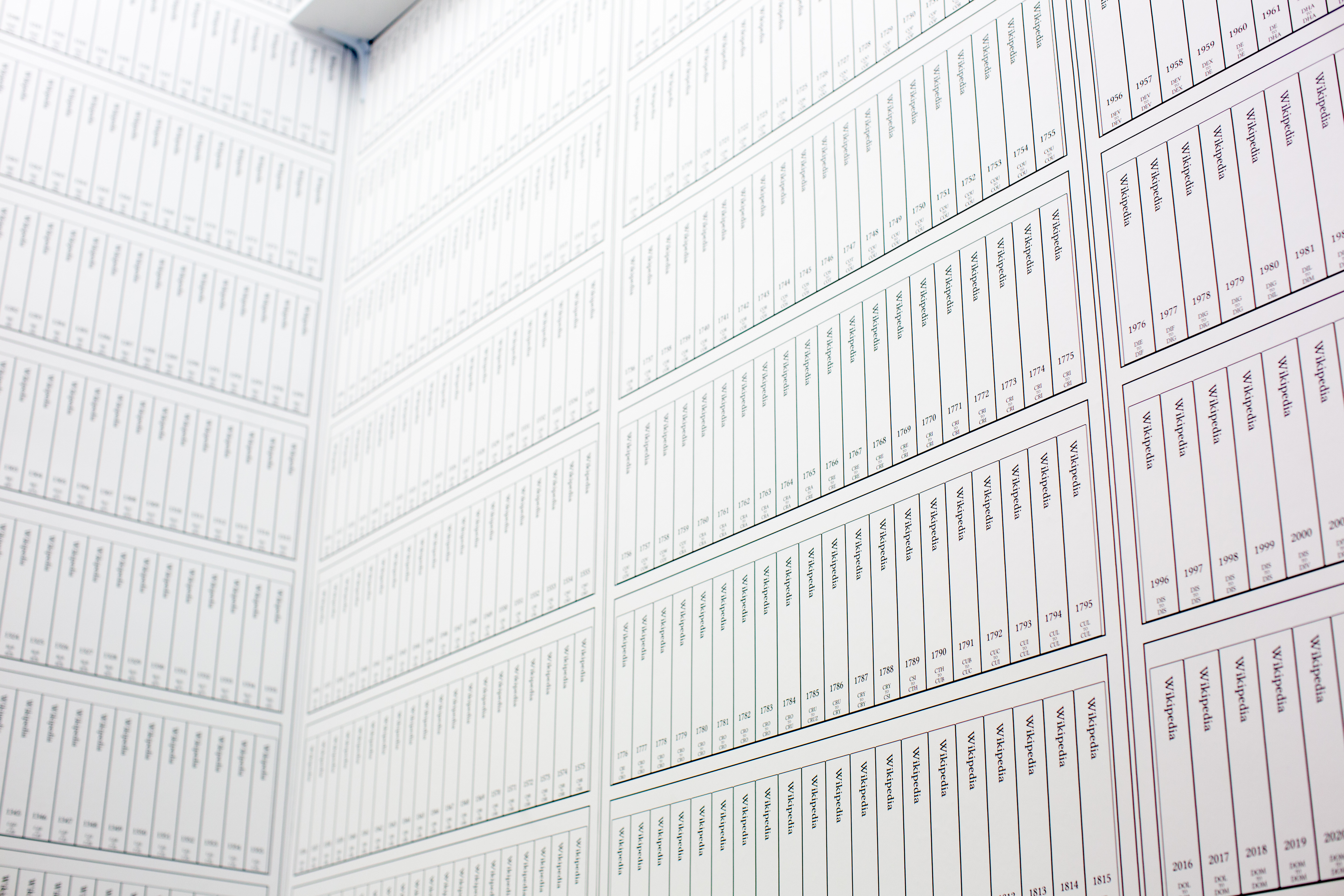
Print Wikipedia

- Shop Mandiberg was an Internet art piece from 2001 in which Michael Mandiberg offered every last thing they owned for sale on the Shop Mandiberg site, from clothing to half-used tubes of toothpaste. By the time the store was closed, Mandiberg had sold over 100 items.
- Mandiberg created two websites, AfterSherrieLevine.com and AfterWalkerEvans.com, which host scans of photographs by Walker Evans as rephotographed by Sherrie Levine. A self-described "one-liner art prank" given more recursion by placing the work online so it can be printed out, thus creating another reproduction. Another artist, Bujar Bala, downloaded scanned photos from AfterWalkerEvans.com and uploaded them on jalbum.net creating an online photo album named After Michael Mandiberg. Mandiberg lately continued the reproduction process by creating an Instagram After Michael Mandiberg account and published filtered and reproduced images on Instagram.
- Oil Standard – commissioned by Turbulence.org is a Firefox plugin that replaces prices on e-commerce websites with the equivalent cost in barrels of crude oil.
- Print Wikipedia – A visualization of how big Wikipedia is. Includes "spine wallpaper" of 2000 out of 7500 volumes and selected volumes printed out. Entire pdfs for Wikipedia volumes uploaded and available for printing.

== Publications ==
- Michael Mandiberg (Editor), The Social Media Reader, New York University Press 2012
- xtine burrough and Michael Mandiberg, Digital Foundations: An Intro to Media Design with the Adobe Creative Suite, New Riders/AIGA Design Press 2008

== See also ==
- Art+Feminism
- List of Wikipedia people
