= Wikipedia in India =

Wikimedia in India refers to all the Wikipedia and Wikimedia projects which are of special interest to people in India or interested in topics relating to India.

== Content in languages of India ==
Wikipedia has different versions for various languages in India. These language Wikipedia versions have their own culture and history of development.

- Assamese Wikipedia
- Bengali Wikipedia
- Bhojpuri Wikipedia
- Gujarati Wikipedia
- Hindi Wikipedia
- Kannada Wikipedia
- Kashmiri Wikipedia
- Konkani Wikipedia
- Malayalam Wikipedia
- Marathi Wikipedia
- Odia Wikipedia
- Punjabi Wikipedia
- Sanskrit Wikipedia
- Santali Wikipedia
- Tamil Wikipedia
- Telugu Wikipedia
- Tulu Wikipedia
- Sindhi Wikipedia
- Maithili Wikipedia
- Nepali Wikipedia

Hindi and English language versions are the most popular in India.

The Wikimedia chapter in India organized the Wikimedia community to establish Santhali language Wikipedia in August 2018. This was part of an effort to feature a tribal language.

Google advises Wikipedia and suggests topics on which Wikimedia community volunteers should write articles, based on the most frequent Google search terms.

In September 2019 the Ministry of Science and Technology expressed an intent to promote the development of Hindi language Wikipedia articles on sciences.

Health experts have collaborated with Wikipedia editors to share information about vaccines in local language.

Readers of various languages have differing interests. For example, in 2019 "Shivaji" was the most popular article in Marathi Wikipedia, "Guru Granth Sahib" was the most popular in Punjabi, and "vagina" was the most popular in Bhojpuri. Wikipedia articles are sometimes the targets of political debate. Articles where there have been discussions and controversy include "2020 Delhi riots" and "Jai Shri Ram".

== Wikimedia community organization in India ==
WikiConference India is a Wikipedia conference first hosted in India in 2011.

In 2004 Wikimedia editors in India began planning a regional organization, Wikimedia India. Organizers drafted by-laws in 2007, and in 2008 convened meetings with the assistance of the Centre for Internet and Society. The organization was founded in July 2009 as the 29th Wikimedia chapter.

A magazine editor named Sangram Keshari Senapati was praised for his development of Odia Wikipedia.

The Wikipedia in Education Programme (WEP) started in 2013 at various colleges. In 2011, students at colleges and universities in Pune were recognized for participating in a Wikipedia education project. In 2020, participants in the WEP were developing content in Tulu.

In 2020, the volunteer Wikipedia community had been funding the majority of Wiki community activities in India.

The Karavali Wikimedia community described that they edit among English, Kannada, the Tulu, and the Konkani Wikipedia language versions. They edit on topics including health and women's interest.

== Wikimedia Foundation engagement in India ==
Ektara, a 2018 Wikimedia Foundation, Hindi language, mass media advertisement

Google sponsored Project Tiger, which was a program to develop Wikipedia content in languages of India. Google provided Chromebooks, while the Wikimedia Foundation offers stipends for an internet connection. Some volunteers balked at the list of subjects provided by Google – mostly topics trending on Google, which some volunteers found irrelevant. Later, a local list was provided.

The Wikimedia Foundation runs fundraising campaigns asking Indian people to donate. One news source described that request for money as awkwardly emotional.

In 2011 the Wikimedia Foundation opened a branch office in India. One of the goals of establishing an office there was to increase regional fundraising.

== Indian government, courts, and Wikipedia ==
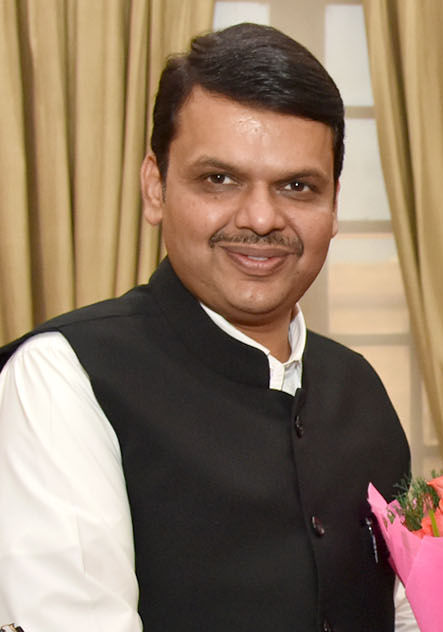
Devendra Fadnavis, chief minister of Maharashtra, complained about Wikipedia's coverage of Sambhaji in 2025.

In 2020, the government of India issued an order to Wikipedia to remove certain maps of India's borders, threatening to block the platform in the country, although that map was in sync with the United Nations and internationally recognised borders.

The Indian government regulates websites including Wikipedia with the Information Technology Rules, 2021. As those rules were being drafted in 2020, some news sources speculated that Wikipedia was not in compliance with those rules.

Author Tuhin Sinha sued the WMF regarding the deletion of the English Wikipedia article about him in 2022. He said the suit was "a fight against the Western deep state." In 2022, India's Supreme Court dismissed defamation suits by the Ayurvedic Medicine Manufacturers Organisation of India against Wikipedia.

In July 2024, Asian News International filed the lawsuit Asian News International vs. Wikimedia Foundation in the Delhi High Court with an accusation of defamation. Asian News International vs. Wikimedia Foundation opened in Delhi High Court in August 2024 with WMF being cited for contempt of court in September and ordered back to court in October. From 21 October 2024 to 9 May 2025, the Wikimedia Foundation suspended access to the article on the court case due to an order from the court.

In September 2024, the Supreme Court of India ordered Wikipedia to remove the name of the victim in the Wikipedia article about the 2024 Kolkata rape and murder incident.

In February 2025, Devendra Fadnavis, chief minister of Maharashtra, complained about what he considered objectionable content in Wikipedia's article about Sambhaji, the 17th century second king of the Maratha Empire. He said "The Constitution grants freedom of speech, but it is not limitless and cannot infringe on others' rights. When obscenity crosses all boundaries, taking action becomes necessary." Directed by Fadnavis, the Maharashtra cyber police filed a first information report (FIR) against a Wikipedian. In April, the cyber police asked the government of India to block Wikipedia.
