= Outline of Wikipedia =

Free online crowdsourced and open source encyclopedia

The following outline is provided as an overview of and topical guide to Wikipedia:

Wikipedia is a free online encyclopedia written and maintained by a community of volunteer editors, known as Wikipedians, through open collaboration and the wiki software MediaWiki. Founded by Jimmy Wales and Larry Sanger in 2001, Wikipedia has been hosted since 2003 by the Wikimedia Foundation, an American nonprofit organization funded mainly by donations from readers. Wikipedia is the largest and most read reference work in history.

Initially available only in English, Wikipedia has grown to over 300 languages and is one of the world's most visited websites as of 2026. The English Wikipedia, with over 7 million articles, remains the largest of the editions, which together comprise more than 68 million articles and attract more than 2 billion unique device visits and 15 million edits per month (about five edits per second on average) as of November 2026. As of November 2026, over 27% of Wikipedia's traffic comes from the United States, while Japan accounts for 6%, and the United Kingdom, Germany, and Russia each represent around 5%.

== Descriptions of Wikipedia ==
Main Page on desktop

- Reference work – compendium of information, usually of a specific type, compiled in a book for ease of reference. That is, the information is intended to be quickly found when needed. Reference works are usually referred to for particular pieces of information, rather than being read from beginning to end. The writing style used in these works is informative; the authors avoid use of the first person, and emphasize facts.
  - Encyclopedia – type of reference work or compendium holding a comprehensive summary of information from either all branches of knowledge or a particular branch of knowledge. Encyclopedias are divided into articles or entries, which are usually accessed alphabetically by article name. Encyclopedia entries are longer and more detailed than those in most dictionaries.
    - Online encyclopedia – large database of useful information, accessible via the World Wide Web.
- Database – organized collection of data. The data is typically organized to model aspects of reality in a way that supports processes requiring information. For example, modelling the availability of rooms in hotels in a way that supports finding a hotel with vacancies.
  - Online database – database accessible from a network, including from the Internet (such as on a web page).
- Website – collection of related web pages containing images, videos, or other digital assets. A website is hosted on at least one web server, accessible via a network such as the Internet or a private local area network through an Internet address known as a Uniform Resource Locator. All publicly accessible websites collectively constitute the World Wide Web.
  - Wiki – website that allows the creation and editing of any number of interlinked web pages via a web browser using a simplified markup language or a WYSIWYG text editor. Wikis are typically powered by wiki software and are often developed and used collaboratively by multiple users. Examples include community websites, corporate intranets, knowledge management systems, and note services. The software can also be used for personal notetaking.
- Community – group of interacting people with social cohesion, who may share common values.
  - Community of action – community in which participants endeavor collaboratively to bring about change.
  - Community of interest – community of people who share a common interest or passion. These people exchange ideas and thoughts about the given passion, but may know (or care) little about each other outside of this area. The common interest on Wikipedia is knowledge.
  - Community of purpose – community that serves a functional need, smoothing the path of the member for a limited period surrounding a given activity. For example, researching a topic on Wikipedia.org, buying a car on autobytel.com, or antique collectors on icollector.com or individual.
  - Virtual community – social network of individuals who interact through specific media, potentially crossing geographical and political boundaries in order to pursue mutual interests or goals.
    - Online community – virtual community that exists online and whose members enable its existence through taking part in membership ritual. An online community can take the form of an information system where anyone can post content, such as a Bulletin board system or one where only a restricted number of people can initiate posts, such as Weblogs.
      - Wiki community – users, especially the editors, of a particular wiki.

== Implementation of Wikipedia ==
- Structure of Wikipedia
  - List of Wikipedias – Wikipedia is implemented in many languages. As of April 2018, there were 304 Wikipedias, of which 294 are active.
  - Logo of Wikipedia – unfinished globe constructed from jigsaw pieces, with some pieces missing at the top, inscribed with glyphs from many different writing systems.
  - Articles – written works published in a print or electronic medium. Each Wikipedia is divided into many articles, with each article focusing on a particular topic.
- Content management on Wikipedia – processes for the collection, managing, and publishing of information on Wikipedia
  - Deletionism and inclusionism in Wikipedia – opposing philosophies of editors of Wikipedia concerning the appropriate scope of the encyclopedia, and the appropriate point for a topic to be included as an encyclopedia article or be "deleted".
  - Notability in English Wikipedia – metric used to determine topics meriting a dedicated encyclopedia article. It attempts to assess whether a topic has "gained sufficiently significant attention by the world at large and over a period of time" as evidenced by significant coverage in reliable secondary sources that are independent of the topic.
  - Reliability of Wikipedia – Wikipedia is open to anonymous and collaborative editing, so assessments of its reliability usually include examinations of how quickly false or misleading information is removed. An early study conducted by IBM researchers in 2003, two years following Wikipedia's establishment, found that "vandalism is usually repaired extremely quickly—so quickly that most users will never see its effects" and concluded that Wikipedia had "surprisingly effective self-healing capabilities".
  - Vandalism on Wikipedia – the act of editing the project in a malicious manner that is intentionally disruptive. Vandalism includes the addition, removal, or other modification of the text or other material that is either humorous, nonsensical, a hoax, spam or promotion of a subject, or that is of an offensive, humiliating, or otherwise degrading nature. There are various measures taken by Wikipedia to prevent or reduce the amount of vandalism.
- Computer technology that makes Wikipedia work:
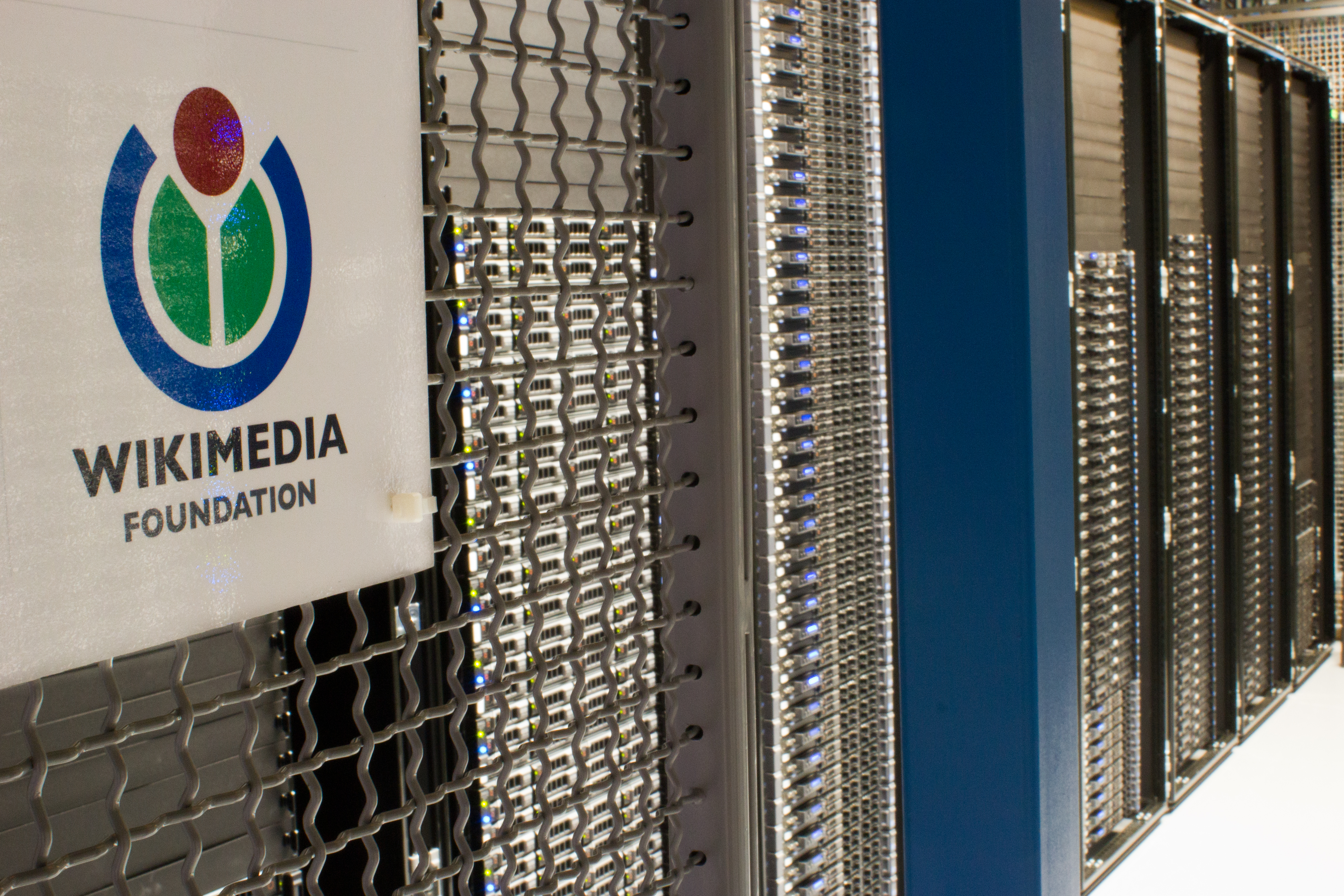
  Servers installed in Ashburn, Virginia (US)
  - Hardware
    - Computers – general purpose devices that can be programmed to carry out sets of arithmetic or logical operations automatically. A computer that is used to host server software is called a "server". It takes many servers to make Wikipedia available to the world. These servers are run by the WikiMedia Foundation.
  - Software – Wikipedia is powered by the following software on WikiMedia Foundation's computers (servers). It takes all of these to make Wikipedia pages available on the World Wide Web:
    - Operating systems used on WikiMedia Foundation's servers:
      - Ubuntu Server – used on all Wikipedia servers except those used for image file storage
      - Solaris – used on Wikipedia's image file storage servers
    - MediaWiki – main web application that makes Wikipedia work. It is a free web-based wiki software application developed by the Wikimedia Foundation (WMF), written in PHP, that is used to run all of WMF's projects, including Wikipedia. Numerous other wikis around the world also use it.
    - Content storage – Wikipedia's content (it's articles and other pages) are stored in MariaDB databases. WikiMedia Foundation's wikis are grouped into clusters, and each cluster is served by several MariaDB servers, in a single-master configuration.
    - Distributed object storage – distributed objects are software modules that are designed to work together, but reside either in multiple computers connected via a network. One object sends a message to another object in a remote machine to perform some task.
      - Ceph – a free and open-source software-defined storage platform that provides object storage.
      - Swift – a distributed and consistent object store.
    - Proxy servers – act as an intermediary for requests from clients seeking resources from other servers. A client connects to the proxy server, requesting some service, such as a file, connection, web page, or other resource available from a different server and the proxy server evaluates the request as a way to simplify and control its complexity. Proxies were invented to add structure and encapsulation to distributed systems. Today, most proxies are web proxies, facilitating access to content on the World Wide Web. The proxy servers used for Wikipedia are:
      - For serving up HTML pages – Squid and Varnish caching proxy servers in front of Apache HTTP Server. Apache processes requests via HTTP, the basic network protocol used to distribute information on the World Wide Web.
      - For serving up image files – Squid and Varnish caching proxy servers in front of Sun Java System Web Server
      - DNS proxies – WikiMedia Foundation's DNS proxy servers run PowerDNS. It is a DNS server program that runs under Unix (including Ubuntu). DNS stands for "domain name system".
      - Load balancing – the process of distributing a set of tasks over a set of resources.
        - Linux Virtual Server (LVS) – Wikipedia uses LVS on commodity servers to load-balance incoming requests. LVS is also used as an internal load balancer to distribute MediaWiki and Lucene back-end requests.
        - PyBal – Wikimedia Foundation's own system for back-end monitoring and failover.
    - Caching
      - Memcached – Wikipedia uses Memcached for caching of database query and computation results.
    - For full-text search – Wikipedia uses Lucene, with extensive customization contributed by Robert Stojnic.
    - Wikimedia configuration files
  - Setting up Wikipedia on a home computer
    - Downloading Wikipedia's database (all article text)
    - Installing MediaWiki (the software that runs Wikipedia)

=== Wikipedia community ===
- Community of Wikipedia – loosely-knit network of volunteers, sometimes known as "Wikipedians", who make contributions to the online encyclopedia, Wikipedia. A hierarchy exists whereby certain editors are elected to be given greater editorial control by other community members.
  - Arbitration Committee (ArbCom) – panel of editors elected by the Wikipedia community that imposes binding rulings with regard to disputes between editors of the online encyclopedia. It acts as the court of last resort for disputes among editors.
  - The Signpost – on-line community-written and community-edited newspaper, covering stories, events and reports related to Wikipedia and the Wikimedia Foundation sister projects.

== Viewing Wikipedia off-line ==
- Kiwix – free and open-source offline web browser created by Emmanuel Engelhart and Renaud Gaudin in 2007. It was first launched to allow offline access to Wikipedia, but has since expanded to include other projects from the Wikimedia foundation as well as public domain texts from the Project Gutenberg.
- XOWA – open-source application written primarily in Java by anonymous developers, intended for users who wish to run their own copy of Wikipedia, or any other compatible Wiki offline without an internet connection. XOWA is compatible with Microsoft Windows, OSX, Linux and Android.

== Diffusion of Wikipedia ==
- Diffusion – process by which a new idea or new product is accepted by the market. The rate of diffusion is the speed that the new idea spreads from one consumer to the next. In economics it is more often named "technological change".
- Diffusion of innovations – process by which an innovation is communicated through certain channels over time among the members of a social system.
- List of Wikipedias – Wikipedia has spread around the world, being made available to people in their native tongues. As of June 2023, there were 320 Wikipedias.

=== Websites that use Wikipedia ===
- Books LLC – publishes print-on-demand paperback and downloadable compilations of English texts and documents from open knowledge sources such as Wikipedia.
- DBpedia – project aiming to extract structured content from the information created in the Wikipedia project.
- Wikipediavision – site that shows in semi-realtime where anonymous edits to Wikipedia are originating from.

==== Websites that mirror Wikipedia ====
- Answers.com
- Bing
- Facebook
- Reference.com
- TheFreeDictionary.com
- Wapedia

==== Wikipedia derived encyclopedias ====
- Books LLC
- VDM Publishing
- Veropedia
- WikiPilipinas
- WikiReader

==== Parodies of Wikipedia ====
- Bigipedia – a comedy series broadcast by BBC Radio 4 in July 2009, which was set on a website which was a parody of Wikipedia. Some of the sketches were directly inspired by Wikipedia and its articles.
- Encyclopedia Dramatica – an online community centered around a wiki that acts as a "troll archive".
- La Frikipedia – a Spanish-language parody of Wikipedia.
- Stupidedia – a German-language wiki featuring satirically themed and humorous articles.
- Uncyclopedia – satirical website that parodies Wikipedia. Founded in 2005 as an originally English-language wiki, the project currently spans over 75 languages. The English version has over 30,000 pages of content, second only to the Brazilian/Portuguese.

=== Wikipedia-related media ===
- Wikipedia Signpost – on-line community-written and community-edited newspaper, covering stories, events and reports related to Wikipedia and the Wikimedia Foundation sister projects.

==== Books about Wikipedia ====
- Common Knowledge?: An Ethnography of Wikipedia
- The Cult of the Amateur
- Good Faith Collaboration
- How Wikipedia Works
- La révolution Wikipédia
- Wikipedia: A New Community of Practice?
- The Wikipedia Revolution: How a Bunch of Nobodies Created the World's Greatest Encyclopedia
- Wikipedia – The Missing Manual
- The World and Wikipedia: How We are Editing Reality
- 위키백과, 우리 모두의 백과사전 (Wikipedia, The Free encyclopedia) - Edited by Korean Wikipedians Ju wan Jin, Chul Jeong, Chul Ryu.

==== Films about Wikipedia ====
- List of films about Wikipedia

=== Third-party software related to Wikipedia ===
- DBpedia (from "DB" for "database") – database built from the structured content of Wikipedia, including infoboxes. It is made available for free on the World Wide Web. DBpedia allows users to semantically query relationships and properties associated with Wikipedia resources, including links to other related datasets.
- Kiwix – free program used to view Wikipedia offline (no Internet connection). This is done by reading the content of the project stored in a file of the ZIM format, which contains the compressed contents of Wikipedia. Kiwix is designed for computers without Internet access, and in particular, computers in schools in the Third World, where Internet service is scant.
- WikiTaxonomy – hierarchy of classes and instances (an ontology) automatically generated from Wikipedia's category system.
- YAGO (Yet Another Great Ontology) – knowledge base developed at the Max Planck Institute for Computer Science in Saarbrücken. It is automatically extracted from Wikipedia and other sources. It includes knowledge about more than 10 million entities and contains more than 120 million facts about these entities.

==== Mobile apps ====
- QRpedia – mobile Web-based system which uses QR codes to deliver Wikipedia articles to users, in their preferred language. The QRpedia server uses Wikipedia's API to determine whether there is a version of the specified Wikipedia article in the language used by the device, and if so, returns it in a mobile-friendly format. If there is no version of the article available in the preferred language, then the QRpedia server performs a search for the article title on the relevant language's Wikipedia, and returns the results.
- WikiNodes – app for the Apple iPad for browsing Wikipedia using a radial tree approach to visualize how articles and subsections of articles are interrelated. It is a visual array of related items (articles or sections of an article), which spread on the screen, as a spiderweb of icons.

==== Reliability analysis programs ====
- Wiki-Watch – free page analysis tool that automatically assesses the reliability of Wikipedia articles in English and German. It produces a five-level evaluation score corresponding to its assessment of reliability.
- Wikibu – assesses the reliability of German Wikipedia articles. It was originally designed for use in schools to improve information literacy.
- WikiTrust – assesses the credibility of content and author reputation of wiki articles using an automated algorithm. WikiTrust is a plug-in for servers using the MediaWiki platform, such as Wikipedia.

== General Wikipedia concepts ==
- Wikipedia iOS apps – a number of organizations within the Wikimedia movement including the Wikimedia Foundation publish official mobile apps for mobile access to Wikipedia.
- Henryk Batuta hoax – hoax perpetrated on the Polish Wikipedia in the form of an article about Henryk Batuta (born Izaak Apfelbaum), a fictional socialist revolutionary and Polish Communist. The fake biography said Batuta was born in Odessa in 1898 and participated in the Russian Civil War. The article was created on November 8, 2004, and exposed as a hoax 15 months later when on February 1, 2006, it was listed for deletion.
- Bomis – former dot-com company founded in 1996 by Jimmy Wales and Tim Shell. Its primary business was the sale of advertising on the Bomis.com search portal, and to provide support for the free encyclopedia projects Nupedia and Wikipedia.
- Conflict of interest editing on Wikipedia – when editors use Wikipedia to advance the interests of their external roles or relationships.
- Deletionpedia – an online archive wiki containing articles deleted from the English Wikipedia.
- Democratization of knowledge – the acquisition and spread of knowledge amongst a wider part of the population.
- Enciclopedia Libre Universal en Español – a Spanish-language wiki-based online encyclopedia
- Essjay controversy – an incident in which Ryan Jordan, a Wikipedia editor who went by the username "Essjay", falsely presented himself as a professor of religion.
- Gene Wiki – a project within Wikipedia that aims to describe the relationships and functions of all human genes.
- Péter Gervai – the founder of the Hungarian Wikipedia and the chair of Wikimedia Hungary.
- Good Faith Collaboration – a 2010 book by Joseph M. Reagle Jr. that deals with the topic of Wikipedia and the Wikipedia community.
- Internet Watch Foundation and Wikipedia – a British watchdog group who blacklisted content on the English Wikipedia related to Scorpions' 1976 studio album Virgin Killer.
- Interpedia – an early proposal for a collaborative Internet encyclopedia.
- Rick Jelliffe – an Australian programmer and standards activist.
- Kidnapping of David Rohde – a journalist for The New York Times who was kidnapped by members of the Taliban in November 2008.
- Alan Mcilwraith – a Scottish former call centre worker from Glasgow who was exposed as a military impostor by a tabloid newspaper after he passed himself off as a much decorated British Army officer.
- National Portrait Gallery and Wikimedia Foundation copyright dispute – lawyers representing the National Portrait Gallery of London (NPG) sent an email letter warning of possible legal action for alleged copyright infringement to Derrick Coetzee, an editor.
- Network effect – the phenomenon by which the value or utility a user derives from a good or service depends on the number of users of compatible products.
- Nupedia – an online encyclopedia built by volunteers.
- Edward Owens (hoax) – a historical hoax created by students at George Mason University in 2008 as a class project for "Lying About the Past".
- Simon Pulsifer – a Canadian contributor to the English-language Wikipedia.
- QRpedia – a multilingual and mobile interface to Wikipedia.
- La révolution Wikipédia – a multi-authored study of Wikipedia focusing on the online encyclopedia's reliability.
- WikiScanner – a publicly searchable database that linked anonymous edits on Wikipedia to the organizations where those edits apparently originated.
- The Truth According to Wikipedia – a Dutch documentary about Wikipedia.
- Truth in Numbers? – a 2010 American documentary film.
- Universal Edit Button – a browser extension that provides a green pencil icon in the address bar of a web browser that indicates that a web page on the World Wide Web (most often a wiki) is editable.
- US Congressional staff edits to Wikipedia – edits to the online encyclopedia Wikipedia by staff of the United States Congress.
- User-generated content – any form of content that has been posted by users on online content aggregation platforms.
- Wolfgang Werlé and Manfred Lauber – German half-brothers who were convicted of the 1990 murder of actor Walter Sedlmayr.
- Wiki – a form of online hypertext publication that is collaboratively edited and managed by its audience directly through a web browser.
- Wikidumper.org – a blog created by author Clifford A. Pickover with the aim to permanently record a snapshot of the "best of the Wikipedia rejects".
- Wikipedia biography controversy – history of Wikipedia controversies since 2001.
- Wikipedia CD Selection – collections of Wikipedia articles have been published on optical discs.
- Wikipedia Review – an Internet forum and blog for the discussion of Wikimedia Foundation projects.
- Wikipedia in culture – references to Wikipedia in popular culture.

== Politics of Wikipedia ==
- Censorship of Wikipedia
- Church of Scientology editing on Wikipedia
- Corporate Representatives for Ethical Wikipedia Engagement
- Wikipedia for World Heritage

== History of Wikipedia ==
History of Wikipedia – Wikipedia was formally launched on 15 January 2001 by Jimmy Wales and Larry Sanger, using the concept and technology of a wiki pioneered by Ward Cunningham. Initially, Wikipedia was created to complement Nupedia, an online encyclopedia project edited solely by experts, by providing additional draft articles and ideas for it. Wikipedia quickly overtook Nupedia, becoming a global project in multiple languages and inspiring a wide range of additional reference projects.

- Nupedia – the predecessor of Wikipedia. Nupedia was an English-language Web-based encyclopedia that lasted from March 2000 until September 2003. Its articles were written by experts and licensed as free content. It was founded by Jimmy Wales and underwritten by Bomis, with Larry Sanger as editor-in-chief.
- Wayback Machine – digital time capsule created by the Internet Archive non-profit organization, based in San Francisco, California. The service enables users to see archived versions of web pages (including Wikipedia) across time, which the Archive calls a "three-dimensional index". Internet Archive bought the domain waybackmachine.org for their own site. It is currently in its beta test.
  - Wikipedia on the Wayback Machine
- Founders of Wikipedia
  - Larry Sanger – chief organizer (2001–2002) of Wikipedia. He moved on and founded Citizendium.
  - Jimmy Wales – historically cited as a co-founder of Wikipedia, though he has disputed the "co-" designation, declaring himself the sole founder.
- Academic studies about Wikipedia – In recent years there have been numerous academic studies about Wikipedia in peer-reviewed publications. This research can be grouped into two categories. The first analyzed the production and reliability of the encyclopedia content, while the second investigated social aspects, such as usage and administration. Such studies are greatly facilitated by the fact that Wikipedia's database can be downloaded without needing to ask the assistance of the site owner.
- Flagged Revisions – software extension to the MediaWiki wiki software that allows moderation of edits to Wiki pages. It was developed by the Wikimedia Foundation for use on Wikipedia and similar wikis hosted on its servers. On June 14, 2010, English Wikipedia began a 2-month trial of a similar feature known as pending changes. In May 2011, this feature was removed indefinitely from all articles, after a discussion among English Wikipedia editors.

=== Wikipedia-inspired projects ===
- Citizendium – is a wiki for providing free knowledge where authors use their real, verified names.
- Conservapedia – is an English-language wiki encyclopedia project written from an American conservative point of view.
- Grokipedia – is an artificial intelligence generated encyclopedia project started by Elon Musk intended as an alternative to Wikipedia.
- Infogalactic – is intended to have less alleged politically progressive, left-wing, or "politically correct" bias than Wikipedia, and to allow articles or statements that would not be allowed on Wikipedia because of problems with Wikipedia's policies on reliable sources, or due to alleged biases held by Wikipedia editors.
- Knol – was a Google project that aimed to include user-written articles on a range of topics.
- Scholarpedia – is an English-language online wiki-based encyclopedia with features commonly associated with open-access online academic journals, which aims to have quality content.
- Uncyclopedia – is a satirical website that parodies Wikipedia. Its logo, a hollow "puzzle potato", parodies Wikipedia's globe puzzle logo, and it styles itself "the content-free encyclopedia", which is a parody of Wikipedia's slogan, "the free encyclopedia". The project spans over 75 languages. The English version has approximately 30,000 pages of content, second only to the Portuguese.

== Wikipedia in culture ==
- In the arts and entertainment
- Stephen Colbert incident
- Wikiracing – game using the online encyclopedia Wikipedia which focuses on traversing links from one page to another. The average number of links separating any two Wikipedia pages is 3.67.

== People in relation to Wikipedia ==
- Jimmy Wales – historically cited as a co-founder of Wikipedia, though he has disputed the "co-" designation, declaring himself the sole founder.
- Larry Sanger – chief organizer (2001–2002) of Wikipedia. He moved on and founded Citizendium. Also a critic of Wikipedia.
- Andrew Lih – veteran Wikipedia contributor, and in 2009 published the book The Wikipedia Revolution: How a Bunch of Nobodies Created the World's Greatest Encyclopedia. Lih has been interviewed in a variety of publications, including Salon.com and The New York Times Freakonomics blog, as an expert on Wikipedia.

=== Critics of Wikipedia ===
- Murat Bardakçı – on Turkish television, he declared that Wikipedia should be banned.
- Nicholas G. Carr – in his 2005 blog essay titled "The Amorality of Web 2.0", he criticized the quality of volunteer Web 2.0 information projects such as Wikipedia and the blogosphere and argued that they may have a net negative effect on society by displacing more expensive professional alternatives.
- Jorge Cauz – president of Encyclopædia Britannica Inc.. In July 2006, in an interview in The New Yorker, he stated that Wikipedia would "decline into a hulking, mediocre mass of uneven, unreliable, and, many times, unreadable articles" and that "Wikipedia is to Britannica as American Idol is to the Juilliard School."
- Conservapedia – English-language wiki project started in 2006 by homeschool teacher and attorney Andy Schlafly, son of conservative activist Phyllis Schlafly, to counter what he called the liberal bias of Wikipedia.
  - Andrew Schlafly – an American lawyer and Christian conservative activist.
- Gay Nigger Association of America – anti-blogging Internet trolling organization. On Wikipedia, members of the group created a page about themselves, while adhering to every rule of Wikipedia in order to use the system against itself.
- Aaron Klein – an American-Israeli conservative political commentator and senior advisor to Prime Minister Benjamin Netanyahu.
- Jaron Lanier – an American computer scientist,
- Robert McHenry – an American encyclopedist who worked for Encyclopædia Britannica Inc., becoming editor-in-chief of the Encyclopædia Britannica.
- Patrick Nielsen Hayden – an American science fiction editor who has contributed to a number of books and magazines, including The Encyclopedia of Science Fiction (2nd edition, 1993).
- Andrew Orlowski – former executive editor of the IT news and opinion website The Register.
- Robert L. Park – an American professor of physics at the University of Maryland, College Park, and a former director of public information at the Washington office of the American Physical Society.
- Jason Scott Sadofsky – creator, owner and maintainer of textfiles.com, a web site which archives files from historic bulletin board systems.
- John Seigenthaler – an American journalist and political figure, known as a prominent defender of First Amendment rights.
- Lawrence Solomon – a Canadian writer on the environment and the executive director of Energy Probe.
- Wikipedia Review – an Internet forum and blog for the discussion of Wikimedia Foundation projects, in particular the content and conflicts of Wikipedia.

== Wikipedia foundations and organizations ==
- Wikimedia Foundation – the non-profit based in San Francisco, California, which was established to own and manage the trademarks and the servers for Wikipedia and its sister projects.
- WikiProjects

== Wikipedia's sister projects ==
- Commons – online repository of free-use images, sound and other media files, hosted by the Wikimedia Foundation.
- MediaWiki website – home of MediaWiki (the software that runs Wikipedia), and where it gets developed.
- Meta-Wiki – central site to coordinate all Wikimedia projects.
- Wikibooks – Wiki hosted by the Wikimedia Foundation for the creation of free content textbooks and annotated texts that anyone can edit.
- Wikidata – free and open knowledge base that can be read and edited by both humans and machines.
- Wikinews – free-content news source wiki and a project of the Wikimedia Foundation that works through collaborative journalism.
- Wikiquote – freely available collection of quotations from prominent people, books, films and proverbs, with appropriate attributions.
- Wikisource – online digital library of free content textual sources on a wiki, operated by the Wikimedia Foundation.
- Wikispecies – wiki-based online project supported by the Wikimedia Foundation. Its aim is to create a comprehensive free content catalogue of all species and is directed at scientists, rather than at the general public.
- Wikiversity – Wikimedia Foundation project which supports learning communities, their learning materials, and resulting activities.
- Wikivoyage – free web-based travel guide for travel destinations and travel topics written by volunteer authors.
- Wiktionary – multilingual, web-based project to create a free content dictionary, available in 158 languages, run by the Wikimedia Foundation.

== Wikipedias by language ==
- Afrikaans (af)
- Albanian (sq)
- Alemannic (als)
- Arabic (ar)
- Aragonese (an)
- Armenian (hy)
- Azerbaijani (az)
- Bambara (bm)
- Basque (eu)
- Belarusian (be-x-old)
- Belarusian (be)
- Bengali (bn)
- Bosnian (bs)
- Bulgarian (bg)
- Cantonese (zh-yue)
- Catalan (ca)
- Cebuano (ceb)
- Chechen (ce)
- Chinese (zh)
- Chuvash (cv)
- Croatian (hr)
- Czech (cs)
- Danish (da)
- Dutch Low Saxon (nds-nl)
- Dutch (nl)
- Egyptian Arabic (arz)
- English (en)
- Esperanto (eo)
- Estonian (et)
- Finnish (fi)
- French (fr)
- Galician (gl)
- Georgian (ka)
- German (de)
- Greek (el)
- Haitian Creole (ht)
- Hebrew (he)
- Hindi (hi)
- Hungarian (hu)
- Indonesian (id)
- Irish (ga)
- Italian (it)
- Japanese (ja)
- Javanese (jv)
- Kannada (kn)
- Kazakh (kk)
- Korean (ko)
- Latin (la)
- Latvian (lv)
- Lithuanian (lt)
- Macedonian (mk)
- Malayalam (ml)
- Malay (ms)
- Marathi (mr)
- Minangkabau (min)
- Min Nan (zh-min-nan)
- Mongolian (mn)
- Neapolitan (nap)
- Nepal Bhasa (new)
- Nepalese (ne)
- Northern Sami (se)
- Norwegian (Bokmål) (no)
- Norwegian (Nynorsk) (nn)
- Occitan (oc)
- Oriya (or)
- Punjabi (Eastern) (pa)
- Persian (fa)
- Polish (pl)
- Portuguese (pt)
- Ripuarian (ksh)
- Romanian (ro)
- Russian (ru)
- Sanskrit (sa)
- Scots (sco)
- Serbian (sr)
- Serbo-Croatian (sh)
- Silesian (szl)
- Simple English (simple)
- Slovak (sk)
- Slovene (sl)
- Spanish (es)
- Swahili (sw)
- Swedish (sv)
- Tagalog (tl)
- Tamil (ta)
- Telugu (te)
- Thai (th)
- Turkish (tr)
- Ukrainian (uk)
- Urdu (ur)
- Uzbek (uz)
- Vietnamese (vi)
- Võro (fiu-vro)
- Waray-Waray (war)
- Welsh (cy)
- Volapük (vo)
- Wolof (wo)
- Yiddish (yi)
- Zulu (zu)

More...

== See also ==
- Ideological bias on Wikipedia
- List of online encyclopedias
- List of Wikipedia controversies
- List of wikis
- Outline of knowledge
- Wikipedia:Help
- Wikipedia:Semapedia
