= Kannada Wikipedia =

Kannada-language edition of Wikipedia

- Screenshot
- Website type: Internet encyclopedia project
- Available in: Kannada
- Headquarters: Miami, Florida
- Owner: Wikimedia Foundation
- Website: kn.wikipedia.org
- Commercial: No
- Registration: Optional
- Content license: Creative Commons Attribution/ Share-Alike 4.0 (most text also dual-licensed under GFDL); Media licensing varies

The Kannada Wikipedia (Kannada: ಕನ್ನಡ ವಿಶ್ವಕೋಶ, romanized: Kannaḍa Viśvakōśa) is the Kannada-language edition of Wikipedia. Started in June 2003, it is moderately active and as of September 2026, it has 34,627 articles with 253 active users. It is the twelfth-most popular Wikipedia in the Indian subcontinent.

The Kannada Wikipedia community held a meeting in Bangalore on 2 April 2006, which got fairly high press coverage.

== History ==
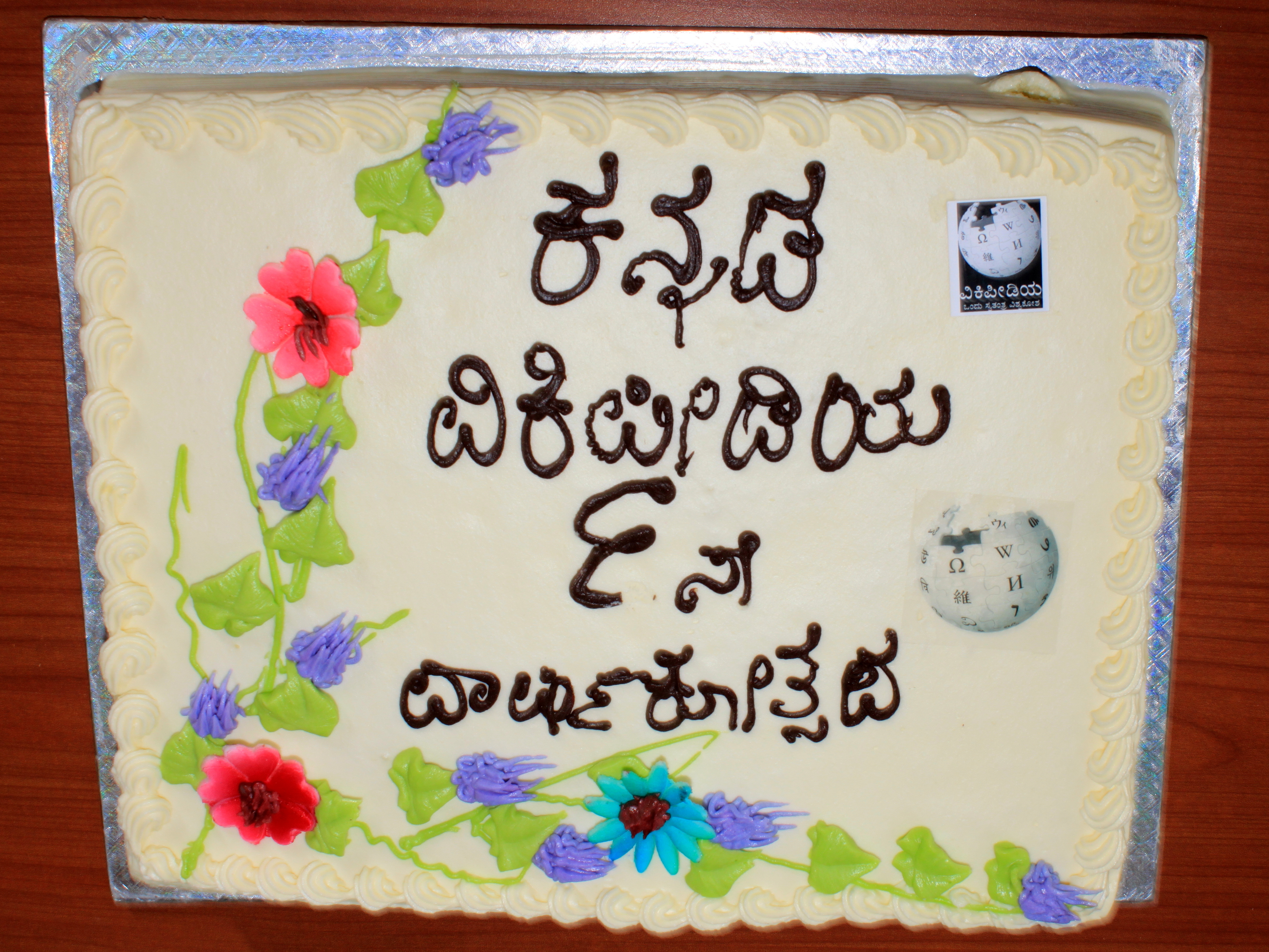
The cake for the 9th anniversary of the Kannada Wikipedia.

As of 16 August 2009 the Kannada Wikipedia had about 6,800 articles, making it the 100th-biggest Wikipedia edition.

As of January 2016, the Kannada Wikipedia is the tenth-largest Indian-language Wikipedia, behind Urdu, Hindi, Tamil, Telugu, Marathi, Malayalam, Bengali, Gujarati, and Punjabi. Administrator Omshivaprakash attributes the lack of articles to a lack of interest among the Kannada-speaking community, a lack of awareness of the Kannada Wikipedia and Kannada typing tools, and limited Internet access in parts of Karnataka.

== Users and editors ==
Kannada Wikipedia statistics
Number of user accounts	Number of articles	Number of files	Number of administrators
99807	34627	2358	6

== See also ==
- Telugu Wikipedia
- Tamil Wikipedia
- Malayalam Wikipedia
- Tulu Wikipedia
- Marathi Wikipedia
