= Nepali Wikipedia =

Nepali-language edition of Wikipedia

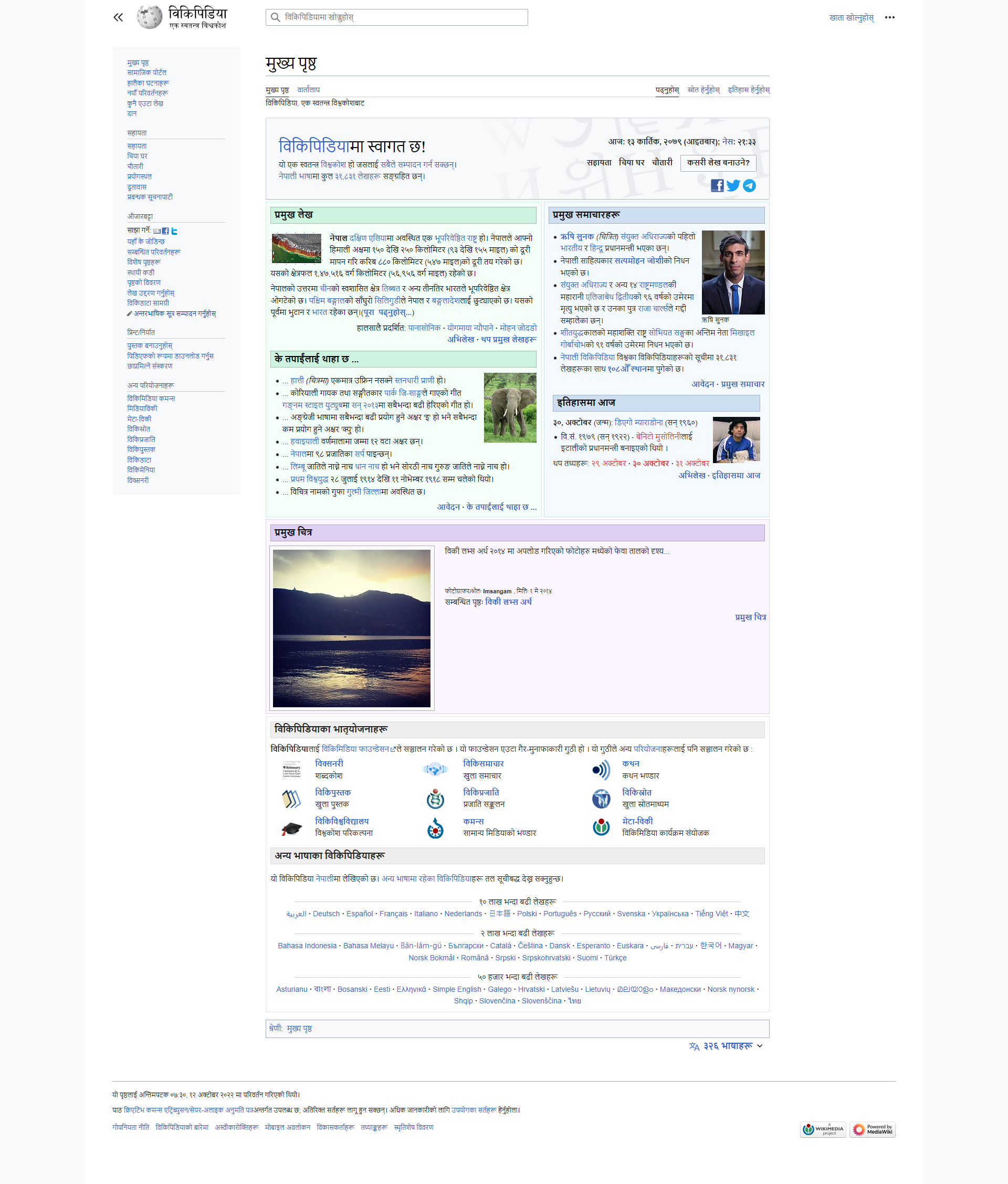
- Screenshot
- Website type: Internet encyclopedia project
- Available in: Nepali
- Founded: 3 June 2002; 24 years ago
- Headquarters: Miami, Florida, United States
- Owner: Wikimedia Foundation
- Creator: Jimmy Wales
- Website: ne.wikipedia.org
- Commercial: No
- Registration: Optional
- Content license: Creative Commons Attribution/ Share-Alike 4.0 (most text also dual-licensed under GFDL); Media licensing varies

The Nepali Wikipedia (Nepali: नेपाली विकिपिडिया, romanized: Nēpālī Vikipiḍiyā) is the Nepali language edition of Wikipedia, run by the Wikimedia Foundation. As of September 2026 it has 30,063 articles and about 80,000 users, of which 5 are administrators. As of 8 November 2022, the Nepali Wikipedia is the 110st largest Wikipedia.

Nepali, using the Devanagari script, requires complex transliteration aids to be typed on devices. Thus, it has a phonetic Latin alphabet converter to Nepali, without having to use any special Nepali-typing software.

== History ==
The Nepali Wikipedia was established on 3 June 2002, one year after the English Wikipedia was started, and it was among the first languages of South Asia to have its own Wikipedia.

== Statistics ==
As of September 2026, the Nepali Wikipedia has about 30,000 articles. The overwhelming majority of its readers originate from Nepal.

Origin of views (2018) Source
| Nepal | 53.6% |
| United States | 13.9% |
| China | 10.4% |
| France | 8.1% |
| India | 6.4% |
| Germany | 3.7% |
| Other | 3.9% |

== Users and editors ==
Nepali Wikipedia statistics
| Number of user accounts | Number of articles | Number of files | Number of administrators |
|---|---|---|---|
| 79,821 | 30,063 | 1,505 | 5 |

== See also ==
- Tamil Wikipedia
- Bhojpuri Wikipedia
- Maithili Wikipedia
- Hindi Wikipedia
- Sanskrit Wikipedia
- Bengali Wikipedia
- Doteli Wikipedia
