= Malayalam Wikipedia =

Malayalam-language edition of Wikipedia

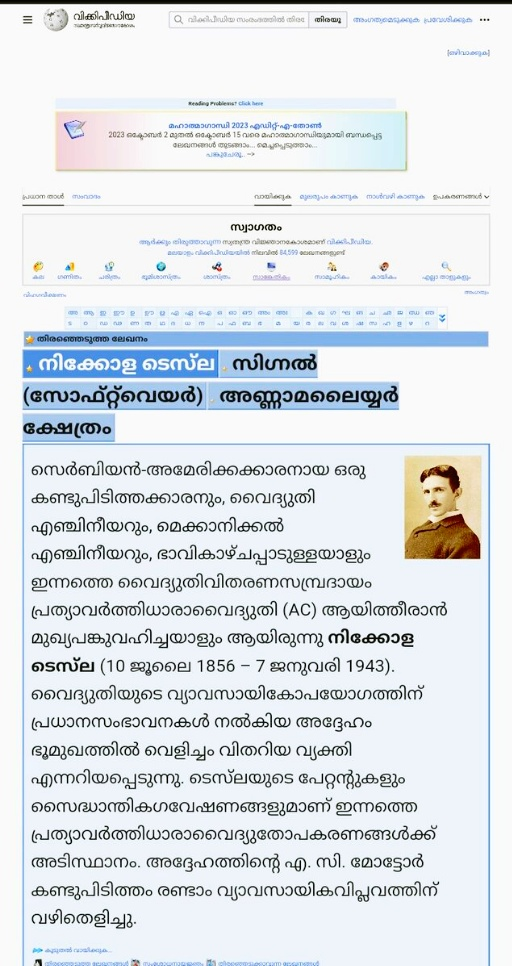
- Screenshot Screenshot of the Malayalam Wikipedia home page
- Website type: Internet encyclopedia project
- Available in: Malayalam
- Owner: Wikimedia Foundation
- Website: ml.wikipedia.org
- Commercial: No
- Registration: Optional
- Launched: 21 December 2002; 23 years ago
- Content license: Creative Commons Attribution/ Share-Alike 4.0 (most text also dual-licensed under GFDL); Media licensing varies

The Malayalam Wikipedia (Malayalam: മലയാളം വിക്കിപീഡിയ, romanized: Malayalam Vikkipediya) is the Malayalam edition of Wikipedia, a free and publicly editable online encyclopedia, and was launched on 21 December 2002. The project is the leading Wikipedia among other South Asian language Wikipedias in various quality matrices. It has grown to be a wiki containing 89,446 articles as of November 2026, and ranks 13th in terms of depth among Wikipedias.

== History ==
=== Beginning ===
Malayalam language Wikipedia is available in the wikipedia.org domain from 21 December 2002. User Vinod M. P. had taken initiatives for it. For the two years following its creation, he had been the key person striving to keep the wiki active. Almost all the early users of Malayalam Wikipedia were non-resident Malayalees. The growth of the Wikipedia during these times was heavily constrained due to OS and browser related issues, rendering issues, Unicode related issues, and so on.

=== Initial growth phase ===
By the middle of 2002, unicode and input tools had become popular. Blogging in Malayalam became widespread. Wikipedians started to use these tools and the Wikipedia reached 100 articles by December 2004. More users joined by the middle of 2005 and the wiki had its first sysop by September 2005. He became the first bureaucrat of the wiki after a month and the wiki became self-sufficient in terms of administration.

The year 2006 saw a number of users joining the wiki, following the widespread usage of Malayalam computing tools. 500th article was born on 10 April 2006; the following September the article count reached 1000. On 15 January 2007, this became 2000 and on 30 June it became 3000.

=== Media coverage and increased growth ===
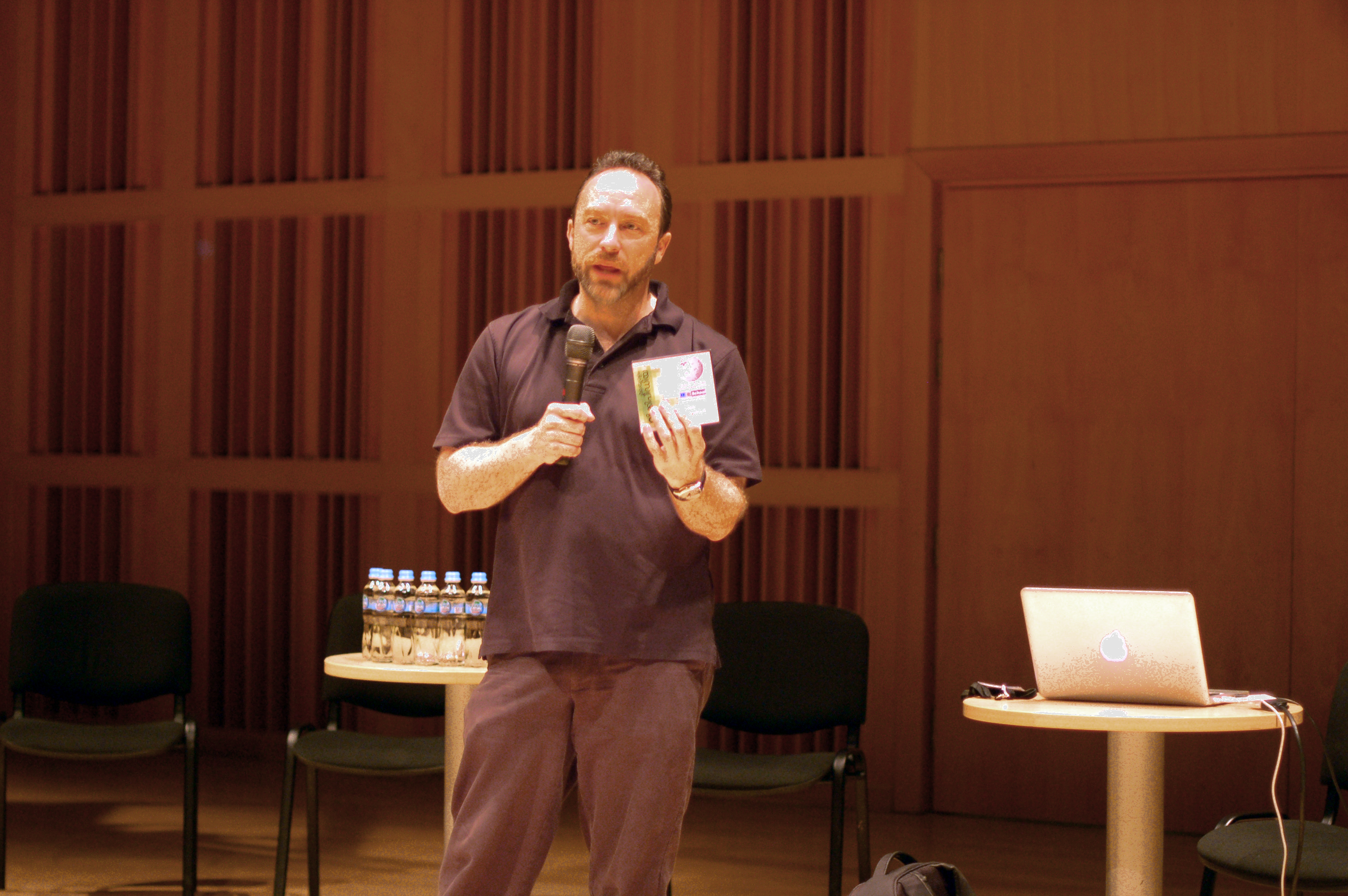
Jimmy Wales introduces Malayalam Wikipedia CD of 500 selected articles to WikiManians during his keynote address at Gdansk

The first major Media coverage about the Malayalam Wikipedia was on 2 September 2007, when Malayalam daily newspaper Mathrubhumi covered Malayalam Wikipedia project extensively in its Sunday Supplement. This generated significant interest in the Wikipedia project and large number of users joined the project and started to contribute. The subsequent growth was exponential.

While the article count increased, extreme care was taken to maintain the quality of articles. The page depth of the wiki remains high at 301 (as of March 2010). When the Wikipedia crossed 10,000 articles on 1 June 2009, a number of print and online newspapers covered the story. Malayalam daily newspaper Madhyamam spent an editorial for the contributors of Malayalam Wikipedia. The mobile version of the Malayalam Wikipedia was launched in February 2010.

== Fonts and input methods ==
Although many Malayalam Unicode fonts are available for old and new Malayalam lipi, most users opt for fonts like AnjaliOldLipi, Rachana and Meera which follows the traditional Malayalam writing style. Early editors adopted specialized Malayalam Unicode input tools based on the Varamozhi keyboard, a phonetic transliteration device. The project has an inbuilt input tool integrated to it.

== Users and editors ==
Malayalam Wikipedia statistics
Number of user accounts	Number of articles	Number of files	Number of administrators
211531	89446	7589	13

== See also ==
- Britannica Malayalam Encyclopedia
- Sarvavijnanakosam
- Hindi Wikipedia
- Tamil Wikipedia
- Telugu Wikipedia
- Kannada Wikipedia
- Bengali Wikipedia
- Punjabi Wikipedia (Eastern)
- Marathi Wikipedia
