= Tulu Wikipedia =

Tulu-language edition of Wikipedia

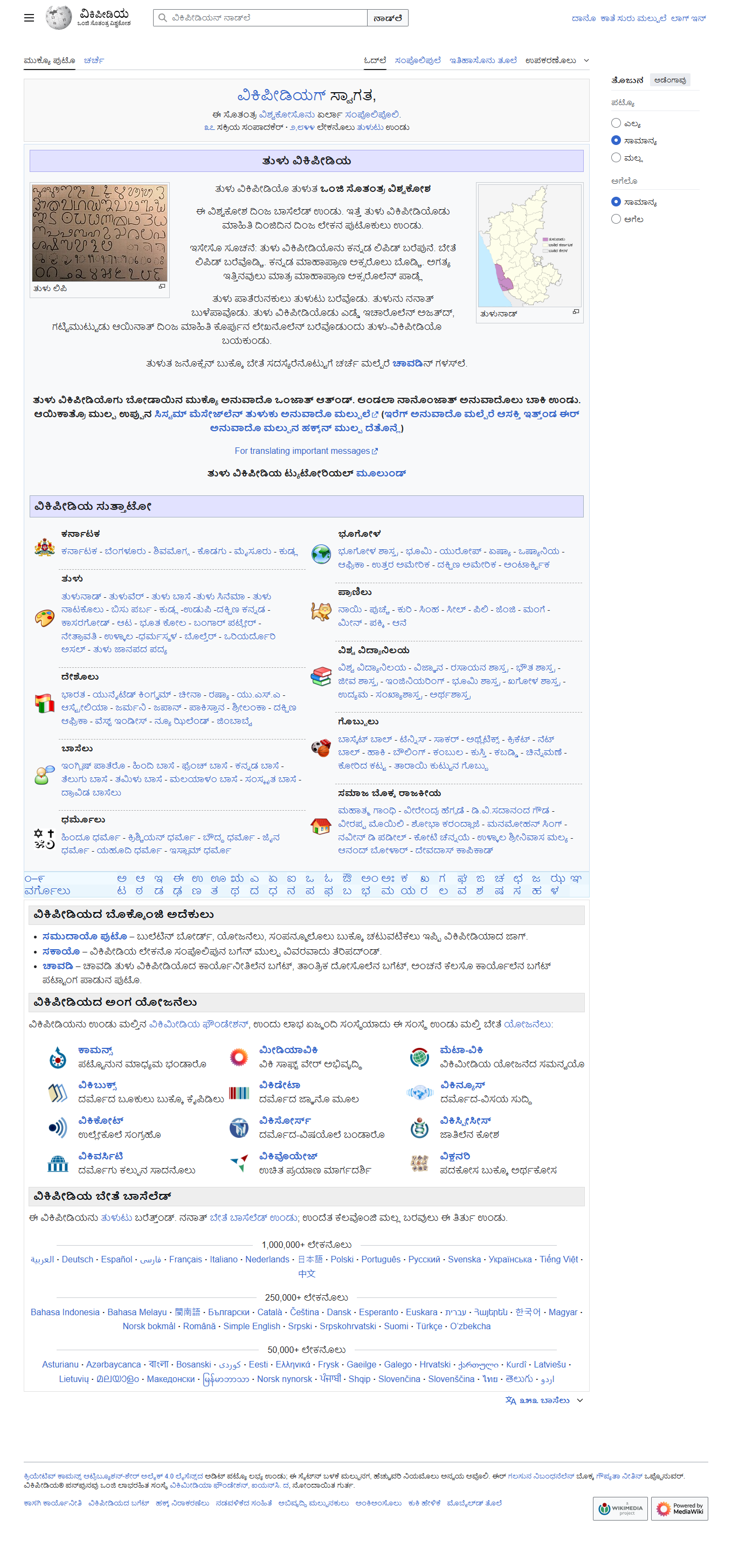
- Screenshot
- Website type: Internet encyclopedia
- Available in: Tulu
- Owner: Wikimedia Foundation
- Website: tcy.wikipedia.org
- Commercial: No
- Registration: Open read access. No registration needed for general editing, but necessary for certain tasks including: • protected page edit; • page creation; • file upload
- Users: 9106
- Launched: 6 August 2016 (as full site)
- Content license: Creative Commons Attribution/ Share-Alike 4.0 (most text also dual-licensed under GFDL); Media licensing varies

The Tulu Wikipedia (Tulu: ತುಳು ವಿಕಿಪೀಡಿಯ) is the Tulu language edition of Wikipedia, run by the Wikimedia Foundation. It currently has 3,975 articles and it is the 239th largest edition of Wikipedia by article count. It is the 23rd language of India to get a Wikipedia, after eight years in incubation.

== History ==
Katherine Maher, the executive director of Wikimedia Foundation, announced the launch of the Tulu Wikipedia as a full site at WikiConference India 2016. It was in incubation since 2008. As of August 2016, it had 200 registered editors, with 10 of them being active, and over 1000 articles. It was the 23rd language from India to have a Wikipedia edition. By 2024, it had doubled in size, and had more than 2,100 articles. The Hindu noted in 2024 that the Tulu Wikipedia does not have any institutional support.

== Users and editors ==
Tulu Wikipedia statistics
Number of user accounts	Number of articles	Number of files	Number of administrators
9106	3975	14	5

== See also ==
- Kannada Wikipedia
- Malayalam Wikipedia
- Tamil Wikipedia
- Telugu Wikipedia
