= Twitscoop =

Twitter client

- Website type: Twitter client & buzz-tracker
- Available in: English
- Owner: Lollicode SARL
- Website: twitscoop.com
- Registration: Using Twitter
- Launched: May 2008
- Current status: Online

Twitscoop is a web-based Twitter client which uses the Twitter API to allow users to send and receive tweets, and do multiple real-time searches at the same time.

== Twitter client ==
Twitscoop is a Twitter client and a real-time visualisation tool which enables users to mine the tweet stream.

Twitscoop's algorithm identifies tags and keywords in the Twitter stream and then ranks them by how frequently they appear versus normal usage. Twitscoop detects growing trends in real-time, identifies breaking news and then monitors specific keywords along with graphs that display the activity for any given word on Twitter. The results are also displayed in a tag-cloud, where the more popular tags are presented in a bigger font. Twitscoop also provides an API for third-party applications, which is being used by TweetDeck for instance.

== History ==
Twitscoop was used by a number of publications to support articles related to buzz propagation on Twitter:

- Buzz created by the Telegraph around MP's expenses in the UK.
- Analysis by Techcrunch about the great Google outage on May 14, 2009.
- Study of the social media role in breaking news by the Telegraph.

== See also ==
- Wikipediavision
