= Bangla O Bangali =

Bengali historical book

- Author: Prabhat Ranjan Sarkar
- Language: Bengali
- Genre: History
- Published: 1988
- Publication place: India
- Media type: Print book
- Pages: 441
- ISBN: 978-81-7252-297-1

Bangla O Bangali (Bengali: বাংলা ও বাঙালী; English: "Bengal and Bengalees" ) is a Bengali-language historical book written by Prabhat Ranjan Sarkar. It was first published in 1988. In this text, he explores many unknown facts and sheds light on the identity, homeland, culture, language, and more of the Bengali people.

== See also ==
- Bengalis
- কংসনারায়ণ (article on Bengali wikipedia)
