= Kashmiri Wikipedia =

Kashmiri-language edition of Wikipedia

- Screenshot
- Website type: Internet encyclopedia project
- Available in: Kashmiri language
- Website: ks.wikipedia.org
- Commercial: No
- Registration: Optional
- Users: 14,612 registered accounts
- Launched: 2004
- Content license: Creative Commons Attribution/ Share-Alike 4.0 (most text also dual-licensed under GFDL); Media licensing varies

The Kashmiri Wikipedia (کٲشُر وِکیٖپیٖڈیا) is the Kashmiri language edition of Wikipedia. It was launched in 2004. On 29 November 2021, it crossed the 1,000 articles milestone. As of September 2026, it has 11,642 articles and 14,612 registered users, making it the 174th largest edition of Wikipedia by article count.

== History ==
Kashmiri Wikipedia was started in 2004. The first edit was made on 25 March 2004 by an anonymous user who added Kashmir letters to the main page. This date is also celebrated as the Birthday of Kashmiri Wikipedia.

== Users and editors ==
Kashmiri Wikipedia statistics
Number of user accounts	Number of articles	Number of files	Number of administrators
14612	11642	94	2

== See also ==
- Arabic Wikipedia
- Urdu Wikipedia
- Hindi Wikipedia
