= Punjabi Wikipedia =

Punjabi-language edition of Wikipedia

- Logo of the Western Punjabi Wikipedia (above) and Eastern Punjabi Wikipedia (below)
- Website type: Internet encyclopedia project
- Available in: Punjabi
- Owner: Wikimedia Foundation
- Website: pa.wikipedia.org (eastern) pnb.wikipedia.org (western)
- Commercial: No
- Registration: Optional
- Users: Western: 45329; Eastern: 61316
- Launched: 24 October 2008; 18 years ago (Western Punjabi); 3 June 2002; 24 years ago (Eastern Punjabi)
- Current status: Active
- Content license: Creative Commons Attribution/ Share-Alike 4.0 (most text also dual-licensed under GFDL); Media licensing varies

The Punjabi Wikipedia (Punjabi: ਪੰਜਾਬੀ ਵਿਕੀਪੀਡੀਆ (Gurmukhi); پنجابی وکیپیڈیا (Shahmukhi), romanized: Pajābī Vikīpīḍī'ā) is the Punjabi language edition of Wikipedia, the free encyclopedia. There are two Punjabi Wikipedia editions, the Eastern Punjabi Wikipedia (in Gurmukhi script) and Western Punjabi Wikipedia (in Shahmukhi script).

== Eastern edition ==
The Eastern edition domain came into existence on 3 June 2002 but the first three articles were only written in August 2004. In July 2012, it had reached 2,400 articles.

Since August 2012, it has about 26 million readers from all over the world.

The first Punjabi Wikipedia workshop was organized in Ludhiana on 28 July 2012 and later another on 16 August 2012 at the Punjabi University in Patiala to inform people how to edit and add to the Wiki.

Wiki-events and workshops to improve this Wikipedia and increase number of editors are conducted on a regular basis. In October 2015 a seminar was organised at an event in Amritsar, where 148 students from 17 schools participated. The aim of the seminar was to increase awareness about Wikipedia among the students.

There are currently 59,758 articles on the Gurmukhi Punjabi Wikipedia, and it is the 105th largest edition of Wikipedia by article count.

== Western edition ==
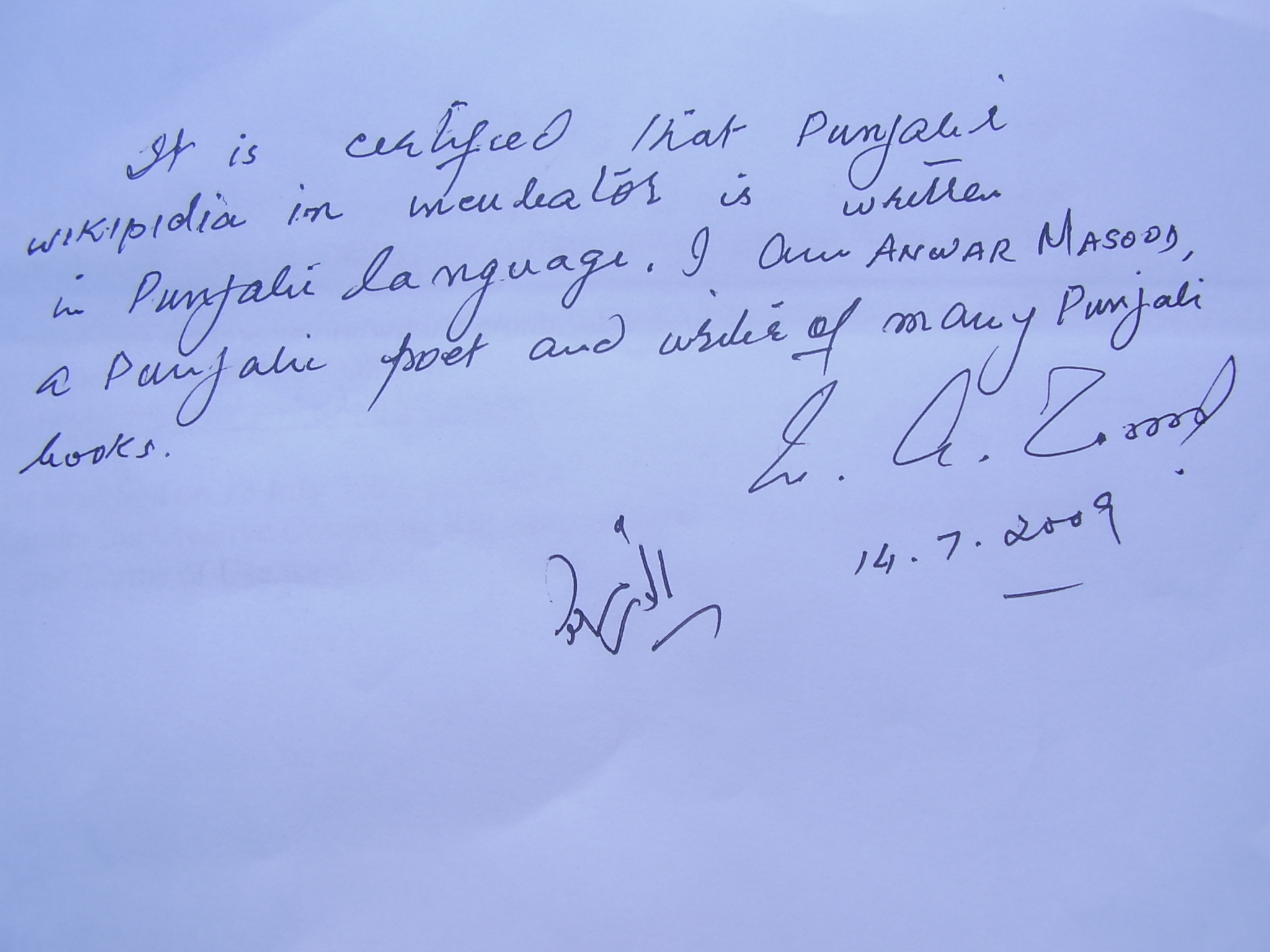
Punjabi-language writer Anwar Masood certifying the launch of the Western Punjabi Wikipedia.

The Western edition was started on 24 October 2008 via the Wikimedia Incubator, and its domain came into existence on 13 August 2009. The project was pioneered by Khalid Mahmood, a college professor from Islamabad.

There are currently 75,824 articles on the Shahmukhi Punjabi Wikipedia, and it is the 90th largest edition of Wikipedia by article count.

== See also ==
- Hindi Wikipedia
- Urdu Wikipedia
- Marathi Wikipedia
- Saraiki Wikipedia
- Sindhi Wikipedia
- Pashto Wikipedia
- Gujarati Wikipedia
- English Wikipedia
