= Tamil Wikipedia =

Tamil-language edition of Wikipedia

- Logo of the Tamil Wikipedia

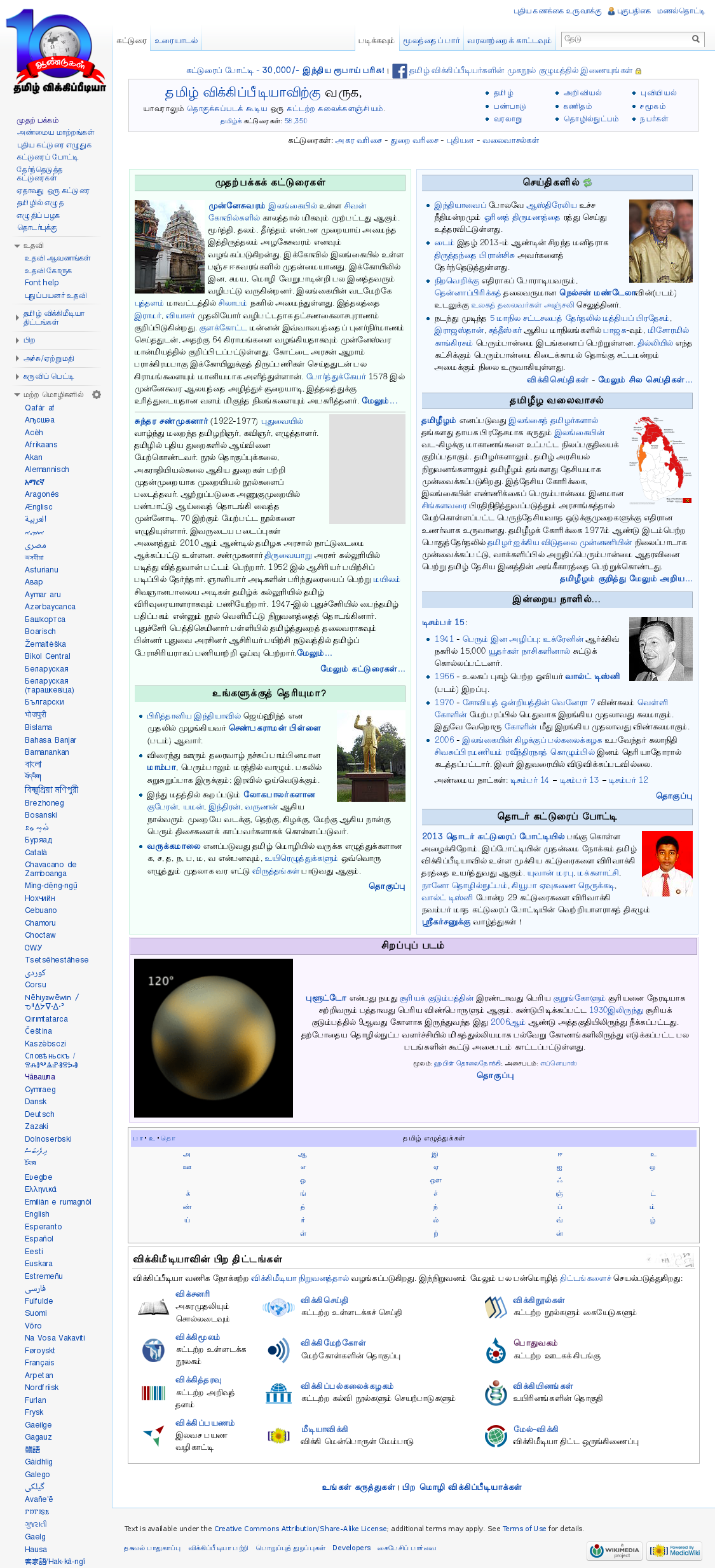
- Screenshot The homepage of the Tamil Wikipedia (December 2013)
- Website type: Internet encyclopedia
- Available in: Tamil
- Headquarters: Miami, Florida
- Owner: Wikimedia Foundation
- Website: ta.wikipedia.org
- Commercial: No
- Registration: Open read access. No registration needed for general editing, but necessary for certain tasks including: • protected page edit; • page creation; • file upload
- Users: 269,456
- Launched: September 2003; 23 years ago
- Content license: Creative Commons Attribution/ Share-Alike 4.0 (most text also dual-licensed under GFDL); Media licensing varies

The Tamil Wikipedia (Tamil: தமிழ் விக்கிப்பீடியா, romanized: Tamiḻ Vikkippīṭiyā) is the Tamil language edition of Wikipedia established in September 2003, run by the Wikimedia Foundation. The Tamil Wikipedia is the largest Wikipedia among Indian languages and the 59th largest Wikipedia by article count (as of 22 November 2026). It is also the first and only Wikipedia of Dravidian origin to possess more than 150,000 articles (as of 2022). The project is one of the leading Wikipedia among other South Asian language Wikipedias in various quality matrices. It has 192,256 articles and 269,456 registered users as of 22 November 2026.

== Cultural significance ==
Contrary to common academic criticism of Wikipedia in the Western countries, the Tamil Wikipedia is widely regarded as an important source of information in the Tamil language on the Internet. The encyclopedia undergoes far less vandalism compared to larger Wikipedia projects, largely because the project has slower growth, mainly due to the lack of computers or Internet service in rural areas of Tamil Nadu and Sri Lanka. Most of the project's development comes from the overseas Tamil diaspora.

In April 2010, the Tamil Internet Conference held a contest for college students across the state of Tamil Nadu, India for increasing content on the Tamil Wikipedia. The contest was made with regard to the World Classical Tamil Conference 2010, a meeting of Tamil scholars across the world who discuss modern development of the language. With over 2000 contestants enrolled, the contest concluded with the creation of 1,200 new academically reviewed articles on the Tamil Wikipedia in various subjects.

In September 2013, the Tamil Wikipedia celebrated its 10th anniversary.

For Tamil Wikipedia, 2017 was a very productive year. More than 27,000 articles were written; the majority of them were written in the period between May and July. In June and July, a teacher education program took place, in 3 districts of Tamil Nadu, giving thousands of articles in Tamil Wikipedia.

== Users and editors ==
Tamil Wikipedia statistics
Number of user accounts	Number of articles	Number of files	Number of administrators
269456	192256	10081	31

== See also ==
- Sinhala Wikipedia
- Bengali Wikipedia
- Malayalam Wikipedia
- Telugu Wikipedia
- Kannada Wikipedia
- Marathi Wikipedia
- Hindi Wikipedia
