= WikipediaVision =

Wikipediavision was a site that showed in semi-realtime where anonymous edits to Wikipedia were originating from. It was launched in the fall of 2007 by László Kozma, at that time a student in Finland. The site combines Wikipedia's recent changes feed with Google Maps for 2D view to visualize the location-based service edits.

The site ceased to operate in 2023.

== See also ==
- Real-time web
- WikiScanner
