= Telugu Wikipedia =

Telugu-language edition of Wikipedia

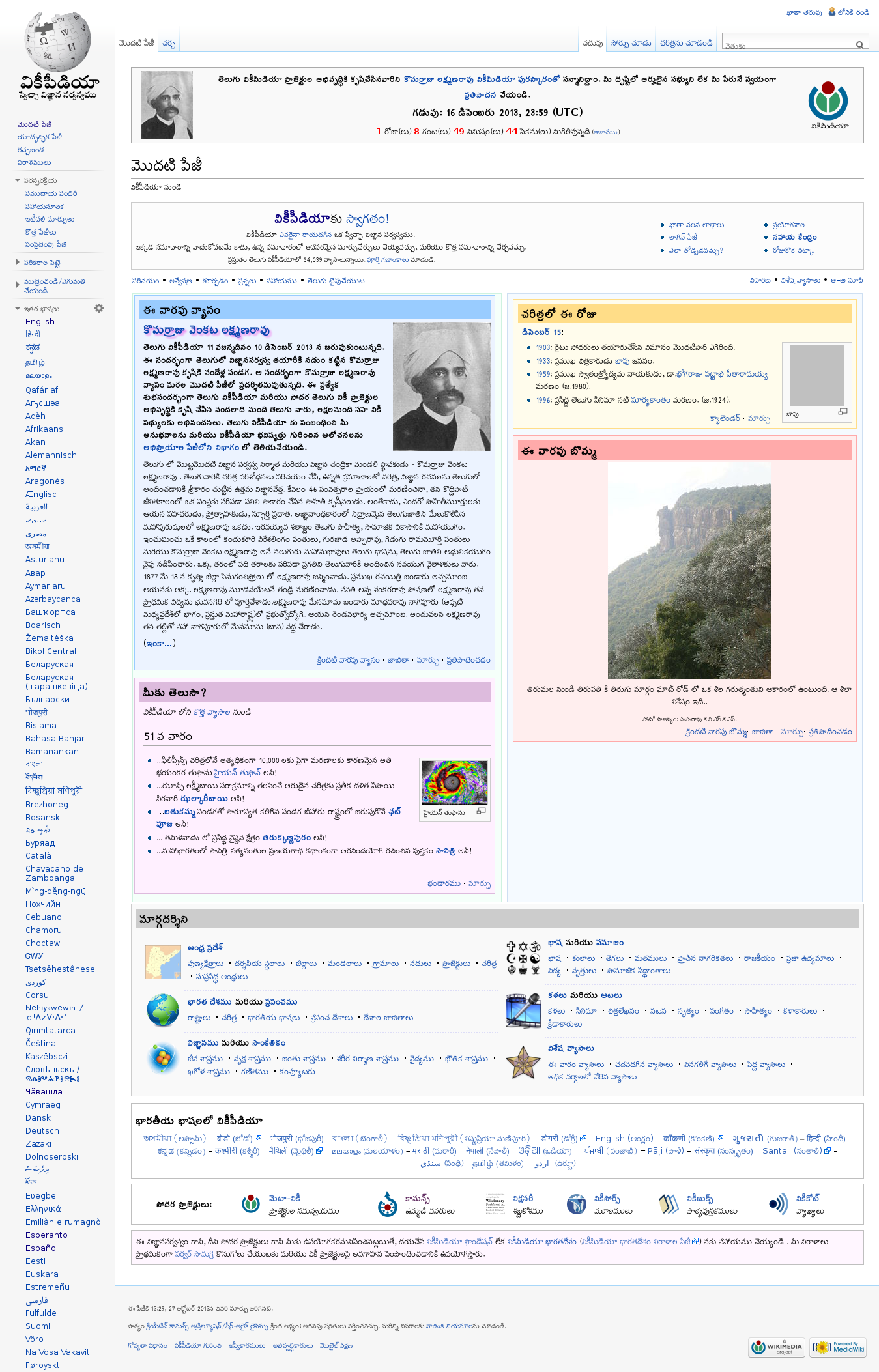
- Telugu Wikipedia main page
- Website type: Internet encyclopedia project
- Available in: Telugu
- Headquarters: Miami, Florida
- Owner: Wikimedia Foundation
- Website: te.wikipedia.org
- Commercial: No
- Registration: Optional
- Launched: 10 December 2003; 22 years ago
- Current status: Online
- Content license: Creative Commons Attribution/ Share-Alike 4.0 (most text also dual-licensed under GFDL); Media licensing varies

The Telugu Wikipedia (Telugu: తెలుగు వికీపీడియా, romanized: Telugu Vikīpīḍiyā) is the Telugu-language version of Wikipedia. It had begun on 10 December 2003 by Nagarjuna Venna, who is known for Padma (a system for transforming text in Indic scripts among open-source and proprietary formats). On 26 September 2024, its article count reached the 100k milestone and it is the fifth largest Indian-language Wikipedia by article count, after Urdu, Tamil, Hindi, and Bengali.

== Background ==
In 2005, the Telugu Wikipedia received a boost when Chava Kiran, Makineni Pradeep, Vyzasatya, Veeven and Chaduvari joined; Chaduvari later spearheaded the Telugu campaign. Satya planned and executed a project to add stubs for districts, mandals and Telugu films with the aid of a bot. The stubs were expanded into articles with the help of volunteers from the Telugu online and blogging communities. Chaduvari translated and drafted many of the initial policies, Pradeep wrote scripts automating mundane tasks and the article count increased to 6,000.

== History ==
A symbiotic relationship between the early Telugu blogger-Wikipedians with the larger Telugu online community was a big boon for the Telugu Wikipedia. Its initial momentum was furthered by committed members such as Kasubabu, Dr Rajasekhar, Chandrakantha Rao, Ravichandra, Veeven, Kasyap, Rahamtulla and Sujatha. Wikipedia was promoted at book fairs in Hyderabad and Vijayawada and supported by the e-Telugu organization and the local-language media, sparking interest from the general public.

Telugu Wiktionary has had a major contribution from Sujatha. Charles Phillip Brown's English-Telugu dictionary was added to the Telugu Wiktionary in its entirety with a bot script written by Telugu Wikipedian Makineni Pradeep.

Telugu wiki-academies were established in 2009 to heighten awareness at engineering and MCA colleges in small towns in Andhra Pradesh. Tewiki Vartha, an e-zine, was created in 2010 to share behind-the-scenes stories of Telugu Wikipedia pages and editors. In 2012, another effort was made to revitalize the Telugu Wikipedia. The community organized a two-day celebration in Hyderabad on 10–11 April 2013, coinciding with the Telugu New Year.

The Telugu Wikipedia is now available offline in Kiwix. HMTV broadcast a documentary about Wikipedia celebrations, and Rajasekhar, Rahimanuddin, Malladi and Vishnuvardhan participated in a phone-in program about the encyclopedia. In October 2013, the Telugu Wikipedia had 2.1 million page views. The greatest number of page views was 4.5 million, recorded in February 2010.

Telugu Wikipedian Pranayraj Vangari wrote 365 Wiki Articles in 365 days under WikiVastaram concept. He started on 8 September 2016, writing a wiki article every day, he completed WikiVastaram on 7 September 2017. On this occasion, Vice President of India Venkaiah Naidu congratulated Pranayraj through his Twitter Account. Telangana State Minister K.T.R along with congratulating him through his Twitter and Facebook Account, felicitated Pranayraj in his chamber at Pragathi Bhavan. Continuing that trend, he completed 1000 articles in 1000 days as of 4 June 2019.

== Fonts and input methods ==
Learn to type in Telugu on Telugu Wikimedia projects in this video.

Any Unicode Telugu font input system may be used for the Telugu Wikipedia. Although some editors use the InScript keyboard, many use Google phonetic transliteration or the Telugu Wikipedia's Universal Language Selector. The latter offers phonetic and InScript keyboards.
