= Sanskrit Wikipedia =

Sanskrit-language edition of Wikipedia

Sanskrit Wikipedia संस्कृत विकिपीडिया
- Sanskrit Wikipedia logo

- Screenshot Screenshot of Sanskrit Wikipedia's Main Page in January 2005
- Website type: Internet encyclopedia project
- Available in: संस्कृतम् (Sanskrit)
- Owner: Wikimedia Foundation
- Creator: Sanskrit wiki community
- Website: sa.wikipedia.org
- Commercial: Charitable
- Registration: Optional
- Launched: December 2003; 22 years ago
- Current status: Online
- Content license: Creative Commons Attribution/ Share-Alike 4.0 (most text also dual-licensed under GFDL); Media licensing varies

Sanskrit Wikipedia (Sanskrit: संस्कृत विकिपीडिया; IAST: Saṃskṛta Vikipīḍiyā) (also known as sawiki) is the Sanskrit edition of Wikipedia, a free, web-based, collaborative, multilingual encyclopedia project supported by the non-profit Wikimedia Foundation. Its five thousand articles have been written collaboratively by volunteers around the world, with major concentration of contributors in India and Nepal.

Founded in December 2003, it reached five thousand articles by August 2011.

The Sanskrit Wikipedia Community also participated in a project named Tell us about your Wikipedia, and Community news from Sanskrit Wikipedia also came on WikiPatrika, a community-written and community-edited newspaper, covering stories, events and reports related to Wikipedia and the Wikimedia Foundation sister projects in India.

As of 27 September 2026, it has 12,565 articles and is the 169th largest version of Wikipedia. The Times of India considered that "Sanskrit was making a comeback, thanks to Wikipedia community" Mother India considered the Sanskrit Wikipedia as a "wonderful learning tool"

== Early history ==
One of the earliest snapshots of the home page, dated 1 June 2004, can be seen at the earlier archives of Sanskrit Wikipedia. The earliest article still available on Sanskrit Wikipedia's site is apparently Damana dīva, dated July 9, 2004, however the first article was made on 21 March 2004.

The number of articles dropped from the 1,000-article mark to only 600 in August 2005 after nearly half were deleted; many of the deletions were due to the articles being in English. The Sanskrit Wikipedia reached 9,405 articles as of 12 December 2013.

== Collaboration with Samskrita Bharati ==
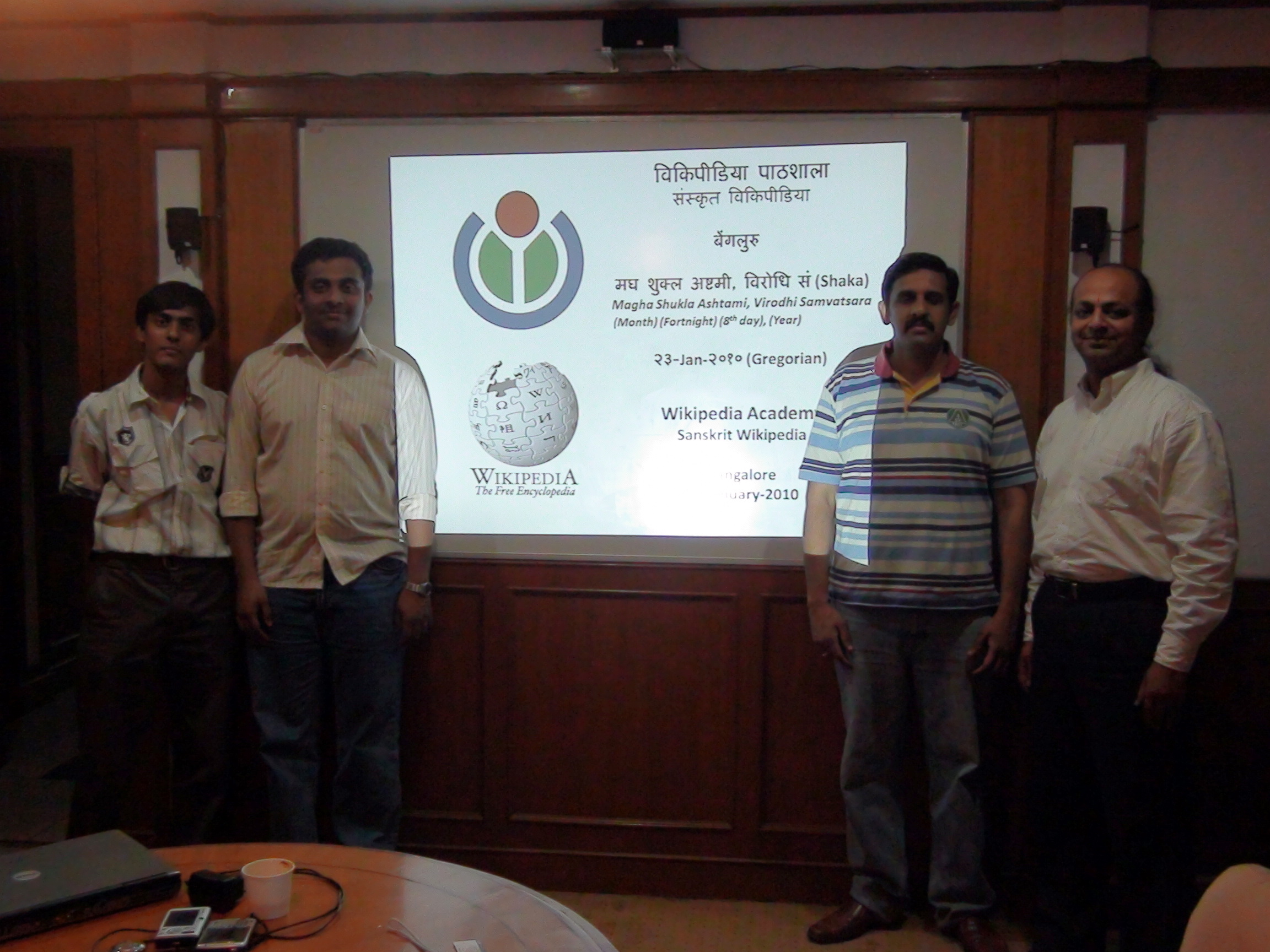
Wikipedia Academy Volunteers

Sanskrit Wikipedia has a collaboration with Samskrita Bharati, a non-profit organisation working to revive Sanskrit. The collaboration efforts started in the Wikipedia Academy organized in Bangalore on 23 January 2010. That Wikipedia Academy was also the first in India.

There were 11 Sanskrita Bharathi participants at the Academy. They were introduced to Wikipedia and contributing to Wikipedia content and were helped in this by a team of roughly 3 Wikipedians.

Later the first Sanskrit Wiki workshop was held in Sanskrit Bharati's office at Bangalore for an audience of 20 participants. The presentation was intended to give a basic working knowledge of Wikipedia and its interface.

A second workshop was held at the same location on 26 March 2011 for another 15 participants from software companies and the Om Shantidham Gurukulam.

== Other collaborations ==
Through an initiative by Gujarat University's Department of Sanskrit, around 150 Sanskrit teachers from different colleges in Gujarat gathered in July 2012 to add materials to the Sanskrit Wikipedia through a two-day-long workshop held titled Sanskrit Wikipedia — Introduction and Expectations.
