= Gujarati Wikipedia =

Gujarati-language edition of Wikipedia

- Screenshot Main Page of the Gujarati Wikipedia in January 2023
- Website type: Internet encyclopedia
- Owner: Wikimedia Foundation
- Website: gu.wikipedia.org
- Commercial: No
- Registration: Optional; required for certain tasks
- Users: 87,256 users, 3 administrators as of 22 September 2026
- Launched: July 2004; 22 years ago
- Content license: Creative Commons Attribution/ Share-Alike 4.0 (most text also dual-licensed under GFDL); Media licensing varies

Gujarati Wikipedia (abbreviated gu-WP) is the Gujarati language version of Wikipedia, an online encyclopedia. It was founded in July, 2004. It has 30,912 articles. As of September 2026, it generates 3 million monthly views.

== Facts and statistics ==
Gujarat in India

Started: July 2004

Founders:

Current size: 30,912 articles

Total edits: 903,771

Total users: 87,256 users

Active editors: 100 in the past month

Active administrators: 3 administrators

Total pages: 136,835 pages

Total files: 0 files

Statistics

As of February 2009, the Gujarati edition has some 2,800 articles and 2,000 registered users.

As of October 4, 2022, it contains 29,986 articles and has 70,004 contributors, including 73 active contributors and 3 administrators.

As of September 2026, it contains 30,912 articles and has 87,256 contributors, including 100 in the past month and 3 administrators.

== See also ==
- English Wikipedia blackout
- Deletionpedia
