= Urdu Wikipedia =

Urdu-language edition of Wikipedia

Urdu Wikipedia اردو ویکیپیڈیا

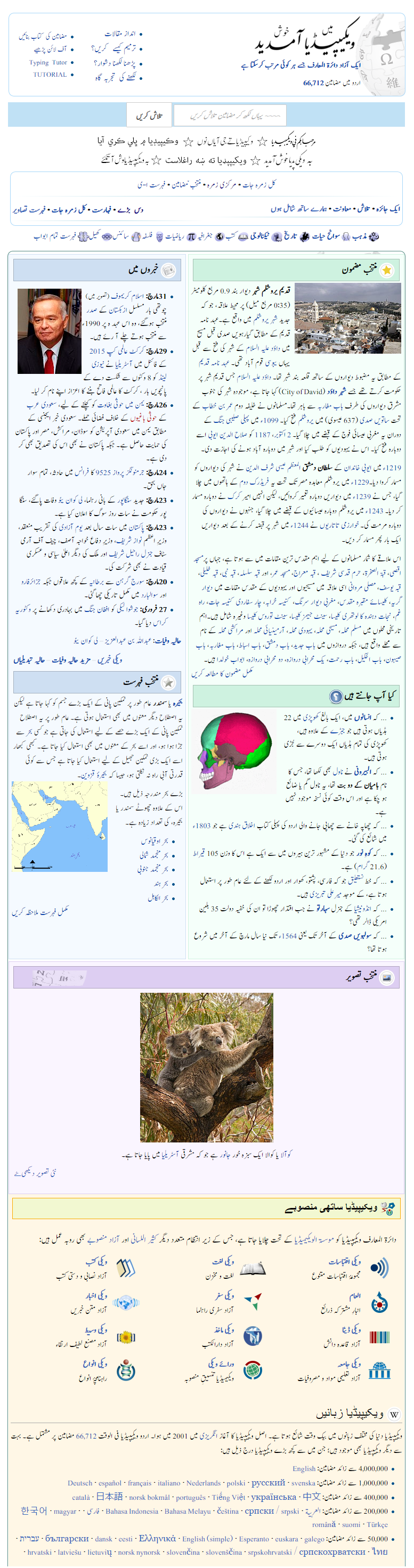
- Screenshot Main Page of Wikipedia Urdu in April 2015
- Website type: Internet encyclopedia
- Available in: Urdu
- Owner: Wikimedia Foundation
- Creators: Wikimedia Foundation and the Urdu Wiki community
- Website: ur.wikipedia.org
- Commercial: No
- Registration: Optional
- Users: 224,043
- Launched: 27 January 2004; 22 years ago
- Current status: Active
- Content license: Creative Commons Attribution/ Share-Alike 4.0 (most text also dual-licensed under GFDL); Media licensing varies

The Urdu Wikipedia (Urdu: اردو ویکیپیڈیا, romanized: Urdū Wikīpēḍiya), started in January 2004, is the Standard Urdu-language edition of Wikipedia, a free, open-content encyclopedia. As of 13 November 2026, it has 708,989 articles, 224,043 registered users and 10,755 files, and it is the 27th largest edition of Wikipedia by article count, and ranks 8th in terms of depth among Wikipedias. There were 6 million page views in January 2024. On 7 January 2024, the Urdu Wikipedia became the first South Asian-language Wikipedia to surpass 200,000 articles, and on 12 June 2026, Urdu Wikipedia became the first South Asian-language Wikipedia to cross 500,000 articles.

== History ==
Wikipedia started being multilingual in May 2001. At first, Urdu Wikipedia faced technical problems with the Urdu script font, but now this matter is mostly settled; some unsolved areas remain. Urdu is written in Perso-Arabic script, a right-to-left writing system. As a result, users sometimes need to configure their operating systems and web browsers accordingly.

Currently, Urdu Wikipedia uses the "Urdu Naskh Asiatype" font, which was introduced and is freely distributed by the BBC at BBC Urdu Service website. The font is primarily used for article bodies and headings. Urdu variation of Times New Roman is used for navigation links. Both of these fonts are variations of Naskh style. Some Pakistani variations of complex Nasta'liq script are also supported only as a secondary choice in class definitions of CSS, i.e. if default font is not found on client system, then Nasta'liq script is used. The translation of the Wikipedia interface and project information pages into Urdu is still in progress. Some pages about how to edit have been translated.

In January 2016, Urdu Wikipedia ranked first in the number of articles as compared to other Indian languages. In India, Urdu Wikipedia activities are hosted and promoted by the Dehalvi Wikimedia User Group. The group hosted its first educational program in Deoband in February 2020. Urdu is the second most popular Wikipedia in Pakistan, behind English. It receives approximately 2 million pageviews in the country, and around 610 thousand in India as of November 2022.

In India, Urdu tops the list of constitutionally recognized languages in terms of the number of articles available on Wikipedia.

== Milestones timeline ==
Date	Milestone
6 May 2004	100
19 June 2006	1,000
13 August 2006	2,000
15 March 2007	5,000
29 March 2009	10,000
28 October 2012	20,000
9 April 2014	40,000
24 April 2014	50,000
12 August 2015	75,000
29 December 2015	100,000
December 2017	125,000
23 November 2019	150,000
7 January 2024	200,000
19 April 2026	300,000
12 May 2026	400,000
12 June 2026	500,000

== Users and editors ==
Urdu Wikipedia statistics
Number of user accounts	Number of articles	Number of files	Number of administrators
224043	708989	10755	9

Urdu Wikipedia has approximately 320 contributors per month. Most users are from Pakistan, although there are many users from India as well. There are also notable users from Saudi Arabia. Much like the rest of Indic languages, Urdu suffers from an acute shortage of contributors due to various reasons. Ahmed Nisar, a contributor to Urdu Wikipedia from India, claims that some of the reasons are the preference of the people for English-language media, as well as the lack of Urdu-speaking experts which are well versed in various aspects of current affairs.

== Differences from Hindi Wikipedia ==
Urdu and Modern Standard Hindi are considered to be standardized registers of the Hindustani language. The difference between Urdu and Hindi Wikipedia in terms of the content's language is mostly in their writing systems and the literary language from which each of the variety derives their non-colloquial vocabulary. Urdu is written in Nastaliq-style of the Perso-Arabic alphabet and derives a significant amount of formal vocabulary from Arabic, Persian and to a lesser extent from Turkic (Chagatai, etc.). Hindi is written in the standardized-Devanagari alphabet of the Nagari script and derives a significant amount of formal vocabulary from Sanskrit majorly in tatsama form.

== See also ==
- Kashmiri Wikipedia
- History of Wikipedia
- Wikipedia community
