= Marathi Wikipedia =

Marathi-language edition of Wikipedia

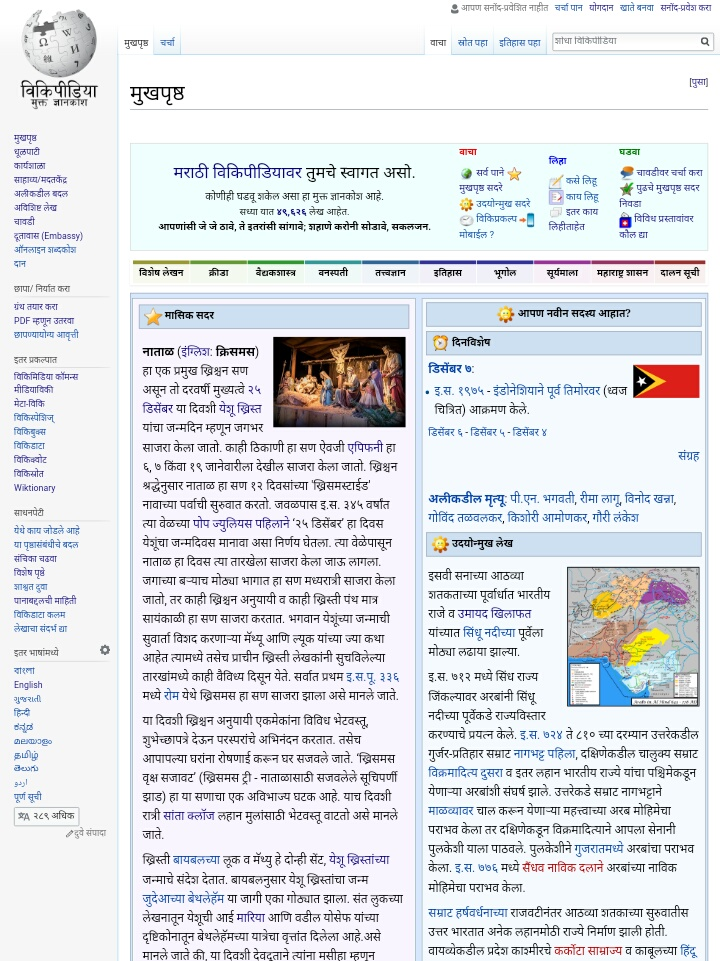
- Screenshot Screenshot of the Marathi Wikipedia home page
- Website type: Internet encyclopedia project
- Available in: Marathi
- Owner: Wikimedia Foundation
- Website: mr.wikipedia.org
- Commercial: No
- Registration: Optional, but required for certain tasks including: editing of protected pages; non-talk page creation (autoconfirmed for articles); page moving (autoconfirmed)
- Users: 185,194 as of 27 September 2026
- Launched: 1 May 2003; 23 years ago
- Content license: Creative Commons Attribution/ Share-Alike 4.0 (most text also dual-licensed under GFDL); Media licensing varies

The Marathi Wikipedia (Marathi: मराठी विकिपीडिया, romanized: Marāṭhī Vikipīḍiyā) is the Marathi language edition of Wikipedia, a free and publicly editable online encyclopedia, and was launched on 1 May 2003. The project is one of the leading Wikipedia among other South Asian language Wikipedia's in various quality matrices. It has grown on to become a wiki containing more than 90,000 articles. As of 27 September 2026, it has 103,103 articles and 185,194 registered users. Among the most visited Marathi-language websites, the Marathi Wikipedia is ranked tenth by Alexa.

== History ==
=== Beginning ===
The Marathi Wikipedia was available in the wikipedia.org domain from 2003 May 1. 'Vasant Panchami'(वसंत पंचमी) (Vasant Panchami) and 'Audumbar' (औदुंबर (कविता)), a poem by the poet Balkavi were the first articles created on Marathi Wikipedia on 2 May 2003.

=== Initial growth phase ===
The Marathi Wikipedia picked up growth from 2006 onwards. On 13 January 2006 Marathi Wikipedia had 1500 articles.

On 27 February, Marathi Day is celebrated.

== Progress ==
Articles
Date	Count
22 September 2008	20,000
2 July 2010	30,000
24 April 2011	33,333
27 February 2014	40,000
11 September 2016	44,444
22 December 2017	50,000
21 August 2020	60,000
24 December 2020	66,666
30 July 2021	77,777
23 September 2021	80,000
29 December 2022	88,888
12 February 2023	90,000

== Users and editors ==
Marathi Wikipedia statistics
Number of user accounts	Number of articles	Number of files	Number of administrators
185194	103103	2400	10

=== Community and events ===
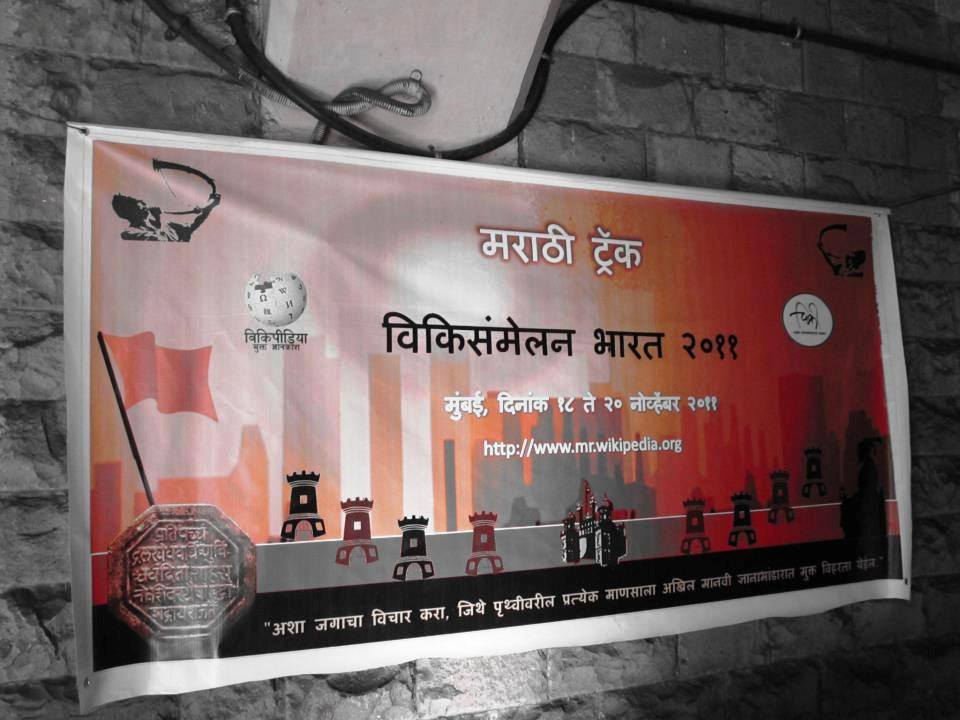

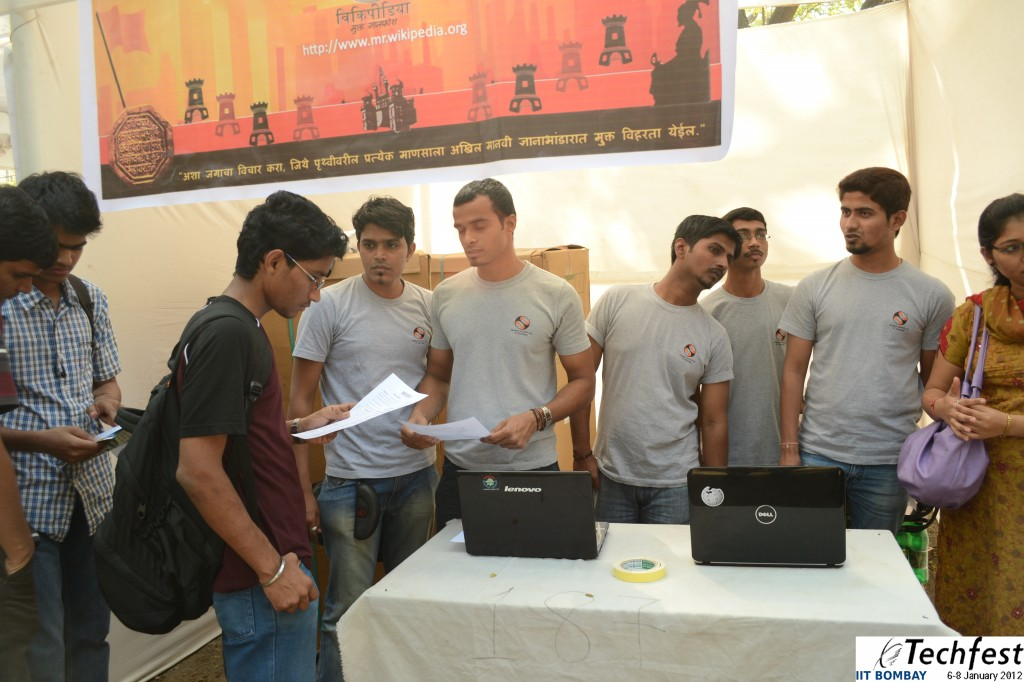

The Marathi Wikipedia has various events organised by volunteers from all over the state. Some of the notable events include,

1. Marathi Wikipedia Vachan Prerna Saptah
2. Wikipedia Asian Month
3. Marathi Bhasha Gaurav Din etc.

=== Media coverage and increased growth ===
Marathi Daily news paper Maharashtra Times was the first to cover and recommend 'Marathi language Wikipedia' on 27 July 2006.

== Fonts and input methods ==
One can use ULS "अक्षरांतरण" (Transliteration) or "मराठी लिपी" (Inscript) typing options to search or edit Marathi Wikipedia articles as shown in this video clip; One can click on the 'cc to change the subtitle languages to Marathi, English, Sanskrit, Kokani, Ahirani languages.

Any one of Unicode Marathi fonts input system is fine for Marathi Wikipedia. Some people use inscript. Majority uses either Google phonetic transliteration or input facility Universal Language Selector provided on Marathi Wikipedia. Phonetic facility provided initially was java-based later supported by Narayam extension for phonetic input facility. Currently Marathi Wikipedia is supported by Universal Language Selector (ULS), that offers both phonetic keyboard (Aksharantaran, Marathi: अक्षरांतरण) and InScript keyboard (Marathi: मराठी लिपी).

== See also ==
- Konkani Wikipedia
