= Hindi Wikipedia =

Hindi-language edition of Wikipedia

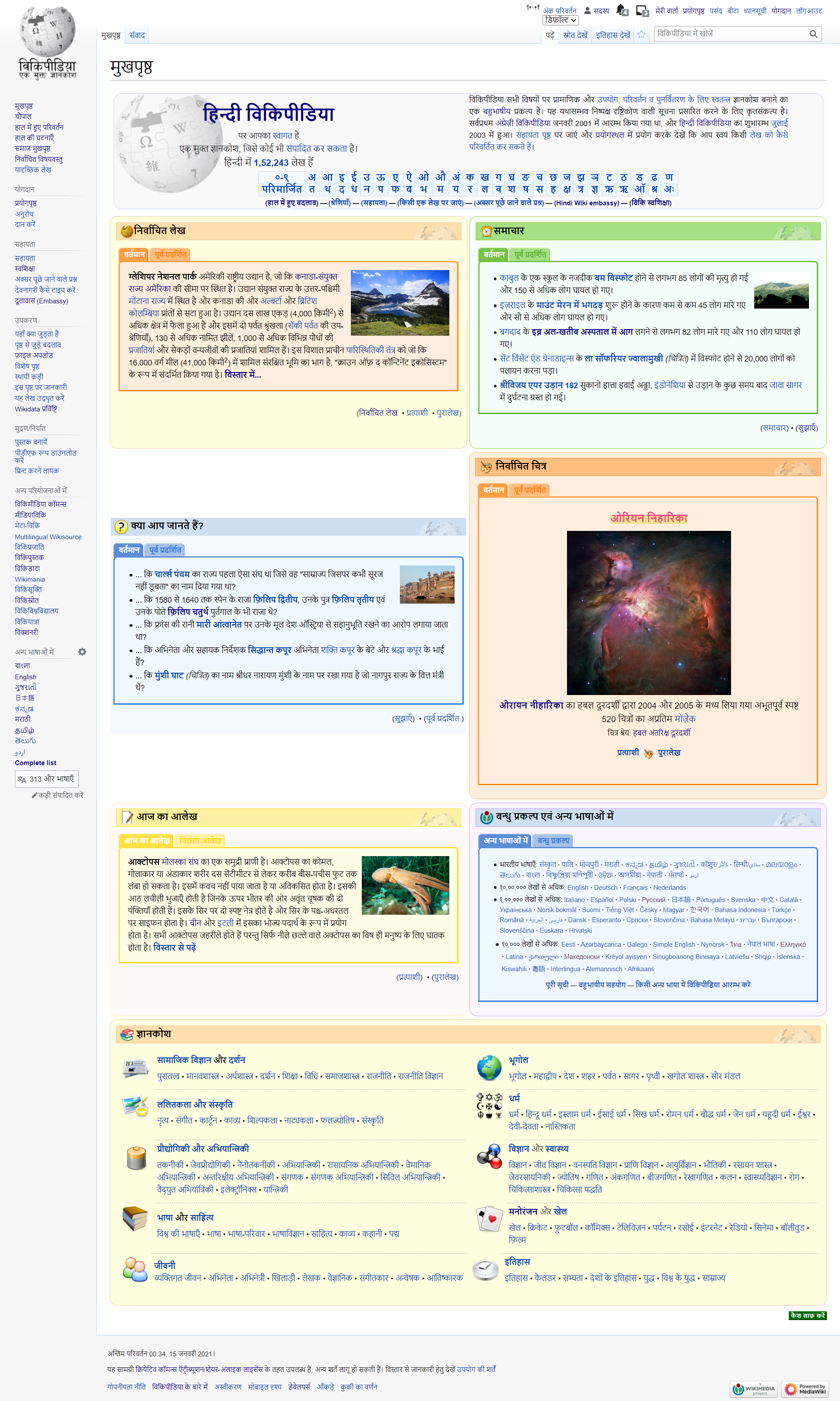
- Screenshot .
- Website type: Internet encyclopedia project
- Available in: Hindi
- Website: hi.wikipedia.org
- Commercial: No
- Registration: Optional
- Users: 926,369 (2026)
- Launched: 11 July 2003; 23 years ago
- Content license: Creative Commons Attribution/ Share-Alike 4.0 (most text also dual-licensed under GFDL); Media licensing varies

The Hindi Wikipedia (Hindi: हिन्दी विकिपीडिया, romanized: Hindī Wikīpēḍiya) is a Modern Standard Hindi edition of Wikipedia. It was launched in July 2003. As of September 2026, it has 171,575 articles, and ranks 11th in terms of depth among Wikipedias.

In December 2023, there were 91 million page views. It is the first Wikipedia to be written in a variety of Hindustani, followed by the Urdu Wikipedia, launched in January 2004. On 30 August 2011, the Hindi Wikipedia became the first South Asian-language Wikipedia to surpass 100,000 articles.

Hindi, using the Devanagari script, requires complex transliteration aids to be typed on devices. Thus, a Phonetic Roman Alphabet converter is also available on the Hindi Wikipedia, so the Roman keyboard can be used to contribute in Hindi, without having to use any special Hindi-typing software.

Hindi Wikipedia is the second most popular Wikipedia in India after the English version. More than 85% of Wikipedia pageviews from India are to the English Wikipedia. Between January 2016 and January 2021 the share of Hindi Wikipedia increased from 2% to 8%. On average, the Hindi Wikipedia receives 50 to 70 million monthly pageviews as of December 2022, mostly from India.

Hindi fell from 15.2 thousand active users in 2020 to 12.2 thousand in 2021. In 2022 the decrease in the number of users with at least one edit in this year continued, although the pace of the decrease was much lower. In the last four months of 2022 the number of active users in Hindi began to grow again and in 2023 the number of active users began to record noticeable growth, nearing the 2020 levels.

== Features ==
Despite the fact that Hindi has 440 to 620 million speakers, based on the 2011 Census of India (the number depends on which definition we take), Hindi Wikipedia has a very low ratio of articles to its number of speakers. Poverty, lack of awareness, and lack of internet access are among the reasons for this. Based on research published by the Wikimedia Foundation in 2018, only 32% of internet users in Madhya Pradesh have heard of Wikipedia. Many Hindi speakers with Internet use English Wikipedia instead.

Given the great geographic spread of the Hindi language, the contributors to the Hindi project live in various areas around the country. There are also prolific users whose native language is not Hindi, as Hindi is a government language in India alongside English. A distinct trend that is observed in Hindi is that for many years, apart from a few dedicated contributors, the composition of the editors in Hindi Wikipedia changes often. Despite this, Hindi has more active users than any other Indic language. Hindi Wikipedians have organised the WikiSammelan conference, with assistance from the Wikimedia Foundation, in order to bring the Hindi Wikipedians together. According to a 2017 research, the readers of the Hindi Wikipedia are motivated to read Hindi-language content more as a part of intrinsic learning, similarly to the Bengali Wikipedia.

=== Attempted state support ===
In September 2019, the Ministry of Science and Technology of India announced a plan to translate articles about science from English to Hindi and other Indian languages. However, the plan was not proceeded with.

=== Google Translator Toolkit usage ===
The Hindi Wikipedia was launched on 11 July 2003. In July 2008, Google announced that they had been working with Hindi Wikipedians to translate English language articles into Hindi and had since 2008 translated 600,000 words in Hindi using a combination of Google Translate and manual checking. This coordinated translation contributed to growth for the site.

== Users and editors ==
Hindi Wikipedia statistics
Number of user accounts	Number of articles	Number of files	Number of administrators
926,369	171,575	4,694	8

== Differences from the Urdu Wikipedia ==
Hindi and Urdu are considered to be standardized registers of the Hindustani language. The differences between the Hindi and Urdu Wikipedia in terms of the content language is mostly in their writing systems and the literary language from which each variety derives its non-colloquial vocabulary. Hindi is written in the standardized Devanagari alphabet of the Nagari script and derives a significant amount of formal vocabulary from Sanskrit, primarily in tatsama form. Urdu is written in the Nastaliq-style and derives a significant amount of formal vocabulary from Arabic, and to a lesser extent from Turkic (Chagatai, etc.).
