= Bengali Wikipedia =

Bengali-language edition of Wikipedia

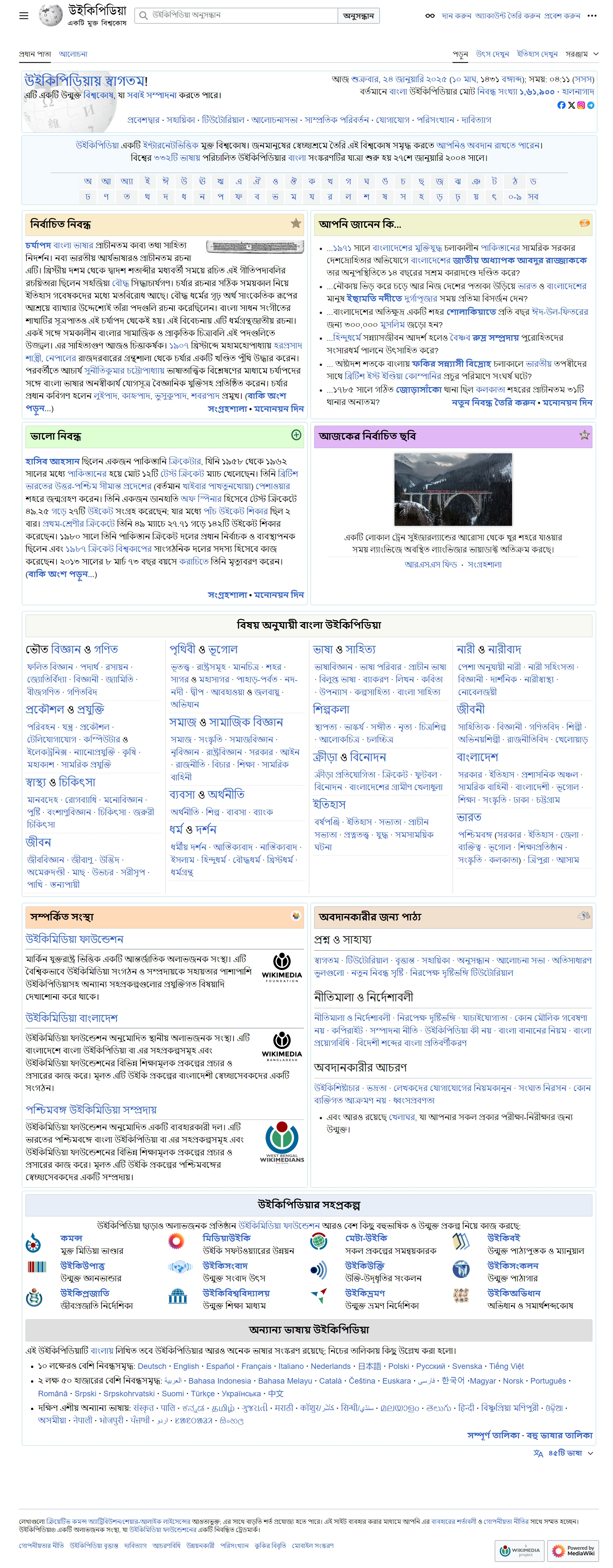
- Screenshot Homepage of the Bengali Wikipedia, 24 January 2025
- Website type: Internet encyclopedia project
- Available in: Bengali
- Headquarters: Miami, Florida, United States
- Owner: Wikimedia Foundation
- Website: bn.wikipedia.org উইকিপিডিয়া.বাংলা
- Commercial: No
- Registration: Optional
- Users: 562,490
- Launched: 27 January 2004; 22 years ago
- Current status: Active, most users are based in Bangladesh and India
- Content license: Creative Commons Attribution/ Share-Alike 4.0 (most text also dual-licensed under GFDL); Media licensing varies

The Bengali Wikipedia or Bangla Wikipedia (Bengali: বাংলা উইকিপিডিয়া, romanized: Bāṅlā Uikipiḍiẏā) is the Bengali language edition of Wikipedia, the free online encyclopedia. Launched on 27 January 2004, it surpassed 10,000 articles in October 2006, becoming the second South Asian language edition to do so. On 25 December 2020, the site achieved the milestone of 100,000 articles. As of 22 September 2026, the Bengali Wikipedia has 191,496 articles. Although it joined later compared to top Wikipedias, it ranks 5th in terms of article depth among 318 active Wikipedias by language.

As of June 2020, the Bengali Wikipedia is the only online free encyclopedia written in the Bengali language. It is also one of the largest Bengali-content-related sites on the internet. The mobile version of the Bengali Wikipedia was launched in 2010.

It also has a phonetic Latin alphabet-to-Bengali script tool so Latin alphabet keyboards can be used to type Bengali without downloading any software. Community-produced news publications include WikiBarta. Similar to most Wikipedias of the region, the median age of the Bengali Wikipedia's editors is younger than that of many European Wikipedias.

== Statistics ==
In the 12-month period between February 2022 and January 2023, the Bengali Wikipedia had an average of 346 active editors and was viewed about 248 million times from all over the world.

As of January 2023, the largest amount of pageviews came from Bangladesh, India, the United States and Saudi Arabia, respectively, reflecting the spread of the Bengali language and the geographical reach of Bengali-speaking immigrants. The article সুভাষচন্দ্র বসু (English: Subhas Chandra Bose) was the most viewed article with 74,239 page views.

== Early history ==
In February 2002, the developers started creating language-code-based subdomains for different language Wikipedias. Along with other Wikipedia subdomains, the Bengali language subdomain was created at that time. A placeholder page was created automatically in that subdomain on 1 June 2002. On 9 December 2003, a Bangladeshi PhD student at Canada's McGill University, Shah Asaduzzaman, emailed Wikipedia founder Jimmy Wales with a request to create the Bengali Wikipedia. As a result, the developers created a test page on Wikipedia named "Home Page" on 26 December of the same year.

The Main Page of the Bengali Wikipedia was created on 27 January 2004, from an IP address, marking the official beginning of the Bengali Wikipedia. 'বাংলা ভাষা' ("Bānglā Bhāshā"; Bengali language in English) was the first article on the Bengali Wikipedia, created on 24 May 2004.

== History ==
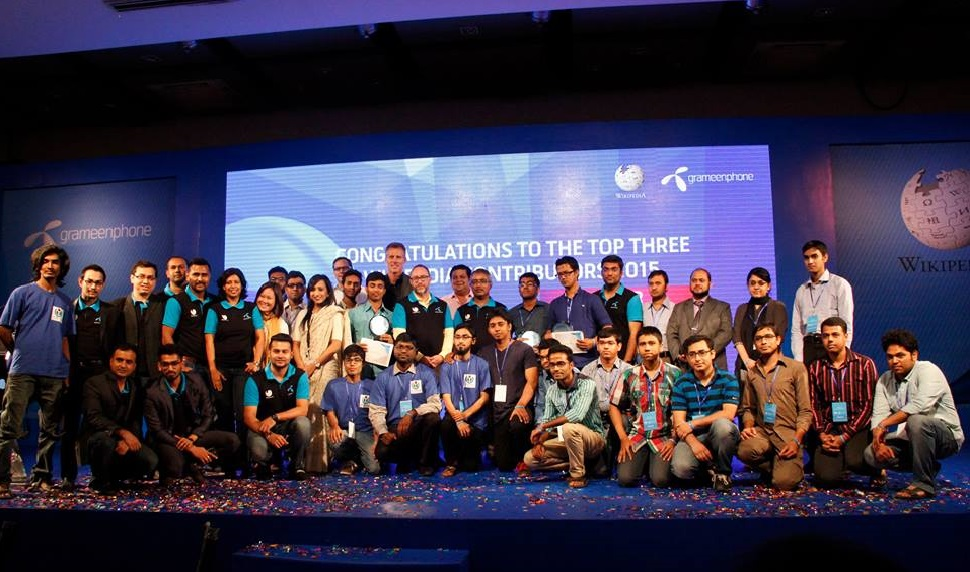
Wikipedia founder Jimmy Wales with Bengali Wikipedians during the Bengali Wikipedia's 10th anniversary celebration in Dhaka (2015)

The Bengali Wikipedia launched on 27 January 2004. At that time, the Bengali-speaking population had little interest in Wikipedia. A few students and scholars used the English Wikipedia, but it was not accountable. Besides that, there were various difficulties contributing in Bengali. This scenario changed in 2006. During that time, the Bengali blogging world was growing slowly, and many people became accustomed to Bengali computing, where a free and open-source Bengali typing tool, Avro Keyboard, played a key role. On 25 March 2006, a Wiki team was created by the Bangladesh Open Source Network (BdOSN) to popularize Wikipedia throughout the country. The aim was to represent Bengalis to the world through Wikipedia and build a complete encyclopedia in Bengali.

At that time, the Bengali Wikipedia had only 500 articles. The 'BdOSN wiki team' managed to spread the word through some newspapers and start a Bengali Wiki mailing list. Soon, many Bengali-speaking people from Bangladesh, India and abroad joined them. As a result, by the end of October, the Bengali Wikipedia got to 10,000 articles. Among the South Asian language Wikipedias, the Bengali Wikipedia reached that milestone first, and many of these articles were illustrated with photos from the activist of the Bengali Language Movement, Rafiqul Islam, who donated all his historical photographs taken during the language movement to Wikimedia Commons.

One of the pioneers of the Bengali Wikipedia, Ragib Hasan, stated:

The biggest challenge was writing something on internet in Bengali. The Bengali Unicode was not supported on most operating systems, only few websites on the internet supported Bengali Unicode, and users had difficulties configuring it. Moreover, the idea of writing something with Bengali Unicode was new. … in the beginning, the idea of a Wikipedia in Bengali was not actually workable.

The very low activity of the Bengali Wikipedia for many years, mostly in the period between 2007 and 2013, can be attributed to the low number of internet users in Bangladesh, especially in the first decade of the 21st century (in 2010, there were only 556,000 internet users in Bangladesh according to research). Thus, it ranked below many other languages with much fewer speakers, including regional languages of Western Europe.

Between 2009 and 2010, Bengali speakers from West Bengal, India, also started to contribute to the Bengali Wikipedia. In the meantime, the Wikimedia Foundation started their operations and on 3 October 2011, a local chapter named Wikimedia Bangladesh was approved in Bangladesh by the Foundation to promote educational content in Bengali. On 26 February 2015, Jimmy Wales, the co-founder of Wikipedia, visited Bangladesh for a celebration program that was organized by Wikimedia Bangladesh to mark the tenth year of the Bengali Wikipedia. In his keynote, Wales said that according to article depth, Bengali Wikipedia is rated quite well.

Since 2018, the Bengali Wikipedia has begun to experience a very strong growth in articles, as more than 16,000 articles were written in 2019 and 21,000 articles in 2020, from just 8,800 articles in 2018. This growth can be attributed to a mixture of edit-a-thons and the arrival of prolific contributors.

The Bengali Wikipedia now has 191,496 articles on various topics with 1,828 active editors per month. As of January 2019, Bengali Wikipedia is the only online free encyclopedia written in the Bengali language. It is also one of the largest Bengali-content-related sites on the internet. Statistically, since early 2019, the Bengali Wikipedia has recorded significant growth. The number of articles has increased from 63,000 to nearly 101,000 in just two years and the number of active users has increased to above a thousand. The number of edits has also recorded significant growth.

On 25 December 2020, the Bengali Wikipedia reached the milestone of 100,000 articles. Since 2019, the number of active users has remained above 1,000.

== Features ==
The Bengali Wikipedia has about 191,496 articles (as of September 2026). It features thousands of articles about Bangladesh and India, although it lacks some articles about the latter and Europe. Due to the history of Bangladesh, Pakistan-related topics are also well covered. Most contributors are based in Bangladesh, and a fair minority in West Bengal; however, very few users are based in other Bengali-speaking areas of India or abroad. Also, online thematic editathons are common in Bengali Wikipedia.

As with many other Indic Wikipedias, before 2020 there was a tendency for active users and pageviews to record a significant increase during the monsoon season (June–October). After October, the growth was largely retained before a new cycle of growth was beginning at June of the next year. That process stopped after 2020. As of June 2022, the Bengali Wikipedia is read approximately 710,000 times per day, indicating that it is pretty popular with Bengali-language speakers. Due to its rapid growth, as described earlier, the Bengali Wikipedia has improved its ranking in the list of the largest Wikipedias by number of articles, increasing from the 80th position in January 2019 to the 58th in February 2026.

During May 2022, the Bengali Wikipedia received 12 million pageviews in Bangladesh and 4 million pageviews in India. Small numbers of pageviews also come from the United States and from the Gulf states, where there are sizable Bengali-speaking migrant communities. It is Bangladesh's second most popular language version of Wikipedia, behind English, but in India it does not receive more than 1% of the Wikipedia pageviews in that country.

The significant number of people who live under the poverty line in Bangladesh (20.5% as of 2019) and lower penetration of the internet in Bangladesh and India is one of the causes for the still low number of articles in Bengali. Also to blame is the socioeconomic context of Bangladesh and West Bengal as a whole.

== Users and editors ==
Bengali Wikipedia statistics
Number of user accounts	Number of articles	Number of files	Number of administrators
562,490	191,496	21,933	16

== Controversies ==
Over the years, there has been confusion in Bangladeshi media regarding some information on the Bengali Wikipedia. In April 2018, Bangladeshi print and electronic media reported that Wikipedia named Runa Laila, a renowned singer from Bangladesh, among its top 30 Bengali people of all time. This confusion arose due to the use of a collage image in the Bengalis article's infobox on the Bengali and English versions of Wikipedia. In October 2018, administrator Nurunnabi Chowdhury Hasive was permanently blocked by the Wikimedia Foundation after it was discovered he had accepted bribes totaling 1.5 million Bangladeshi taka (approx. US$17,685) from the Bangladeshi government for paid editing without disclosing the conflict of interest. In August of the same year, an unregistered user added a false date of death in Muhammed Zafar Iqbal's article, which also attracted media attention.

== Gallery ==
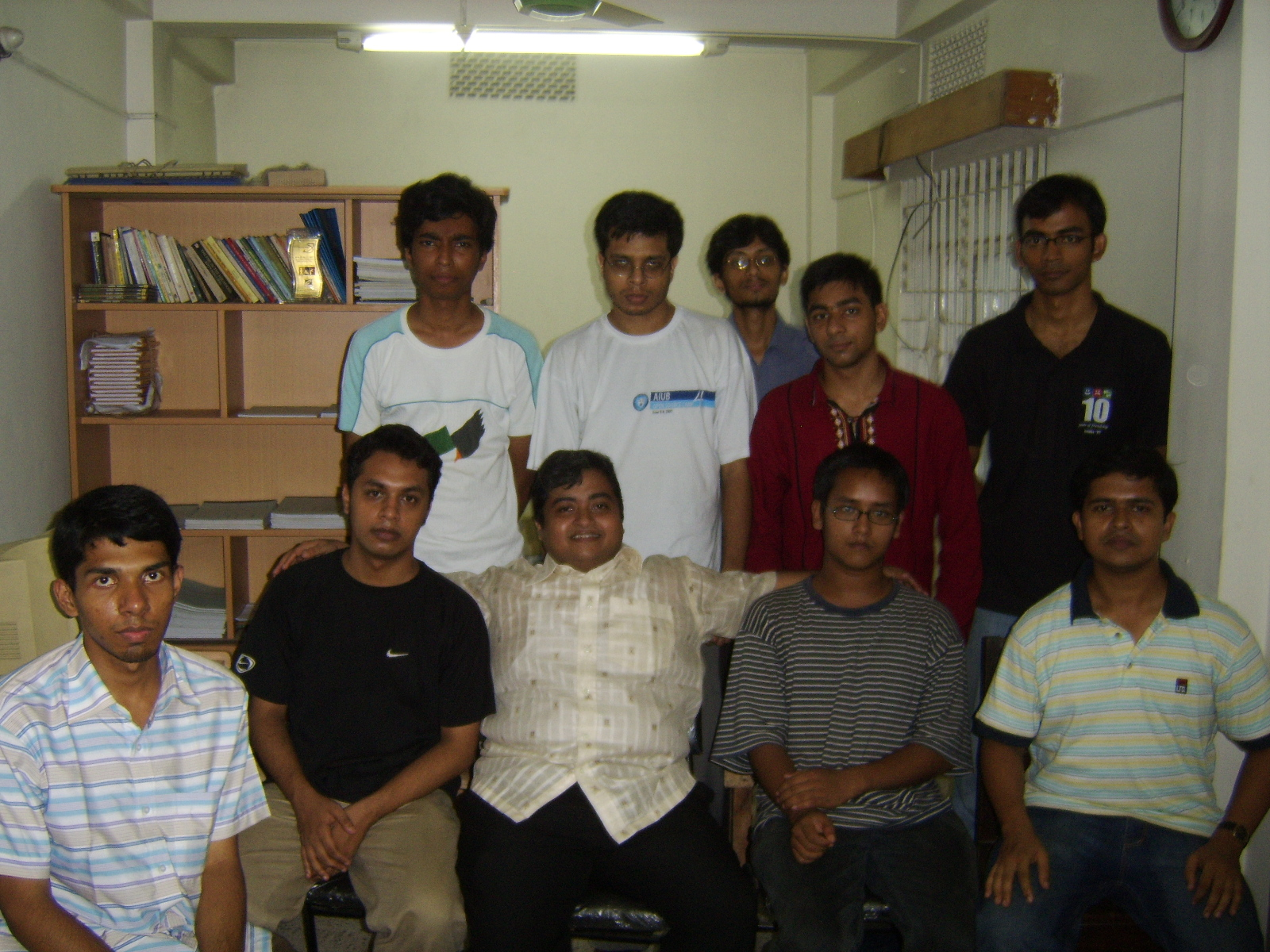
First ever Bengali Wikipedia meetup, Dhaka (2007)

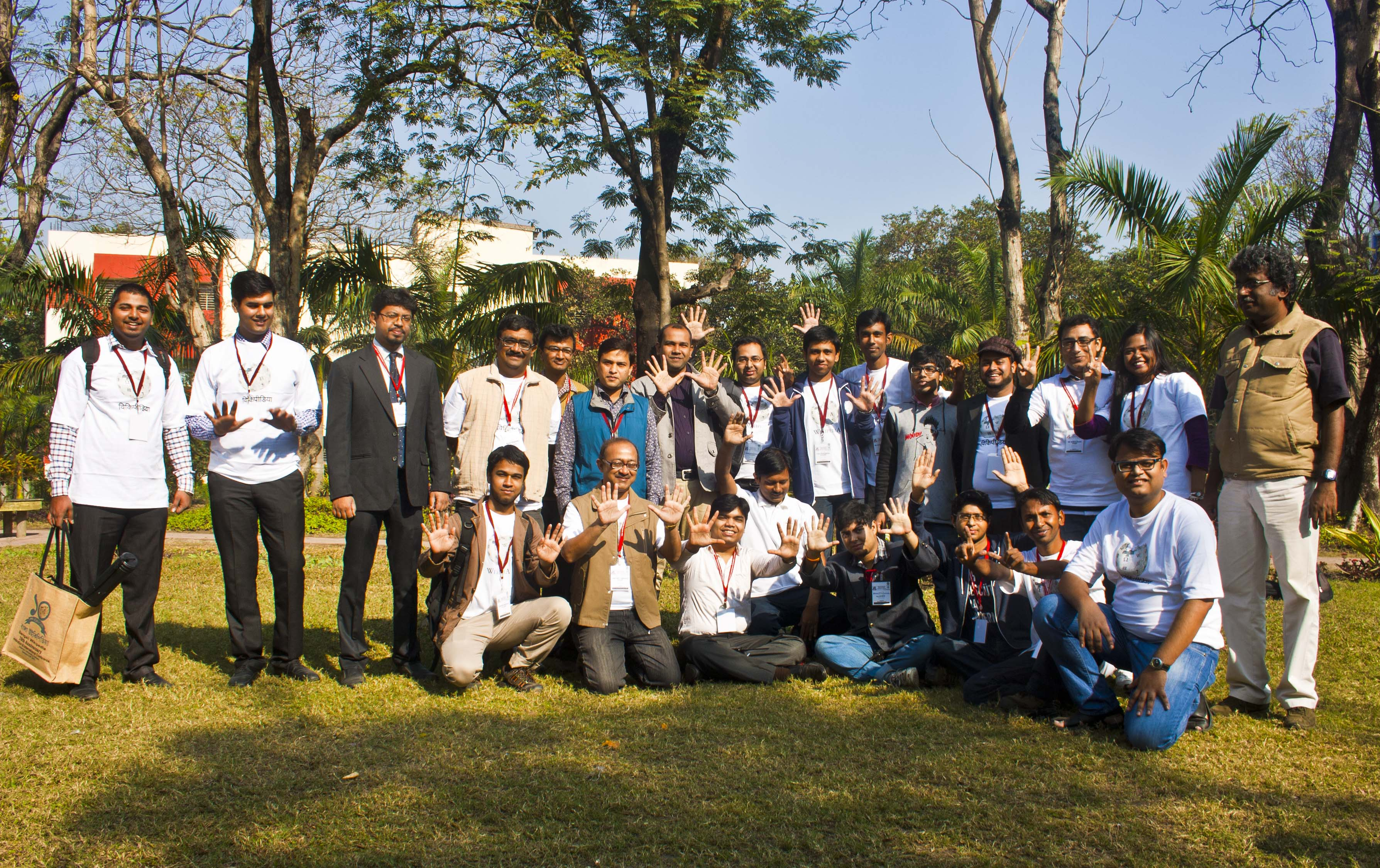
Bengali Wikipedia's 10th Anniversary group photo, Kolkata (2015)

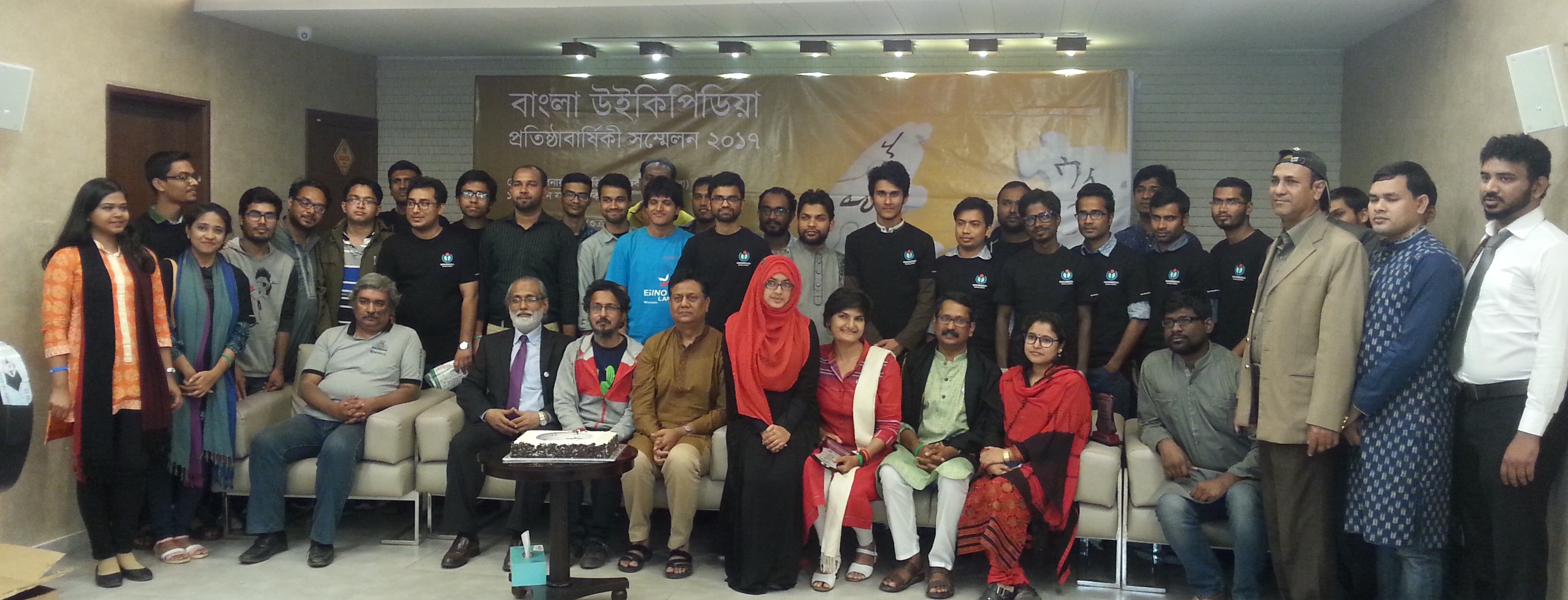
Bengali Wikipedia's 13th Anniversary group photo, Dhaka (2017)

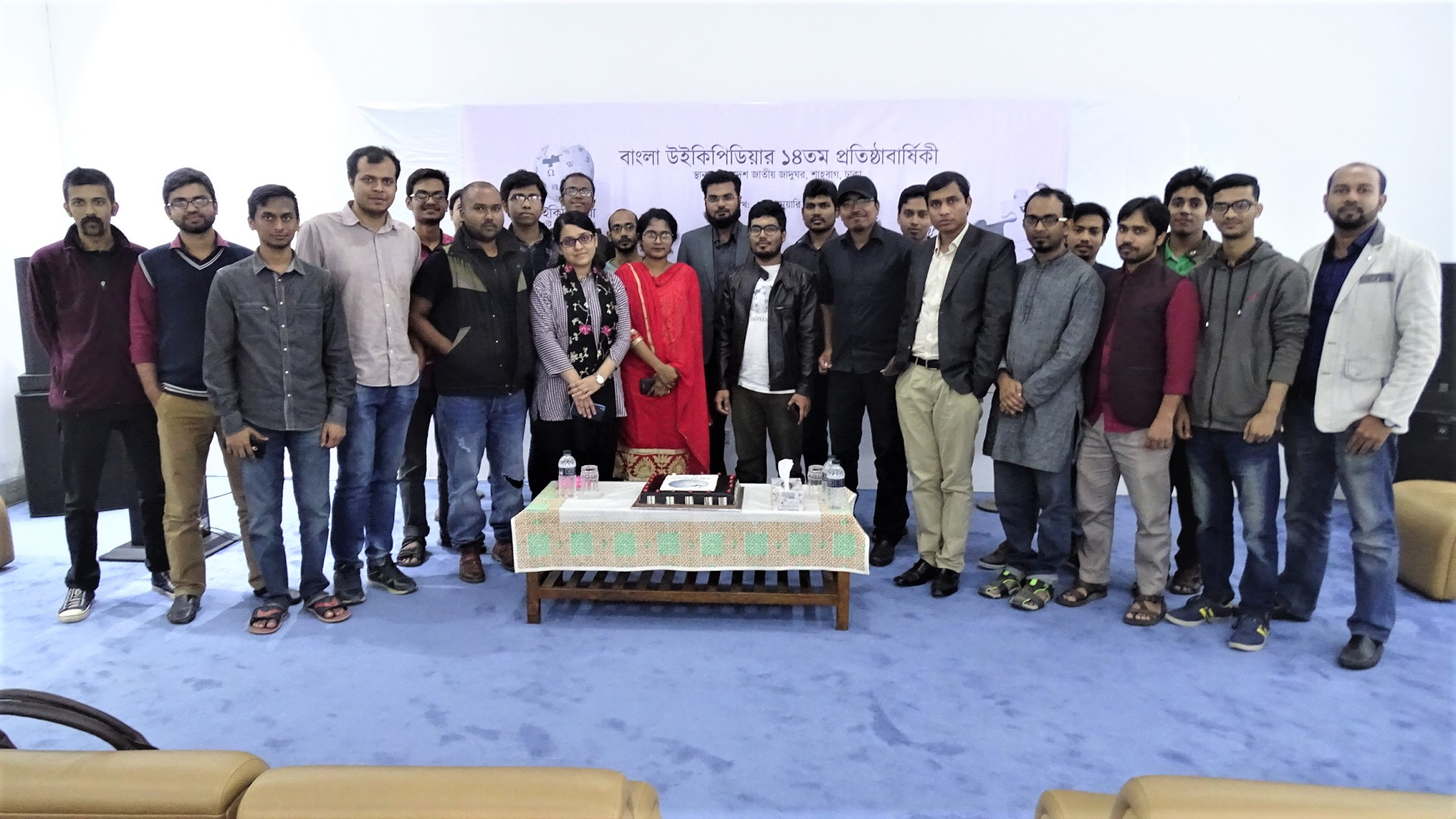
Bengali Wikipedia's 14th Anniversary group photo, Dhaka (2018)

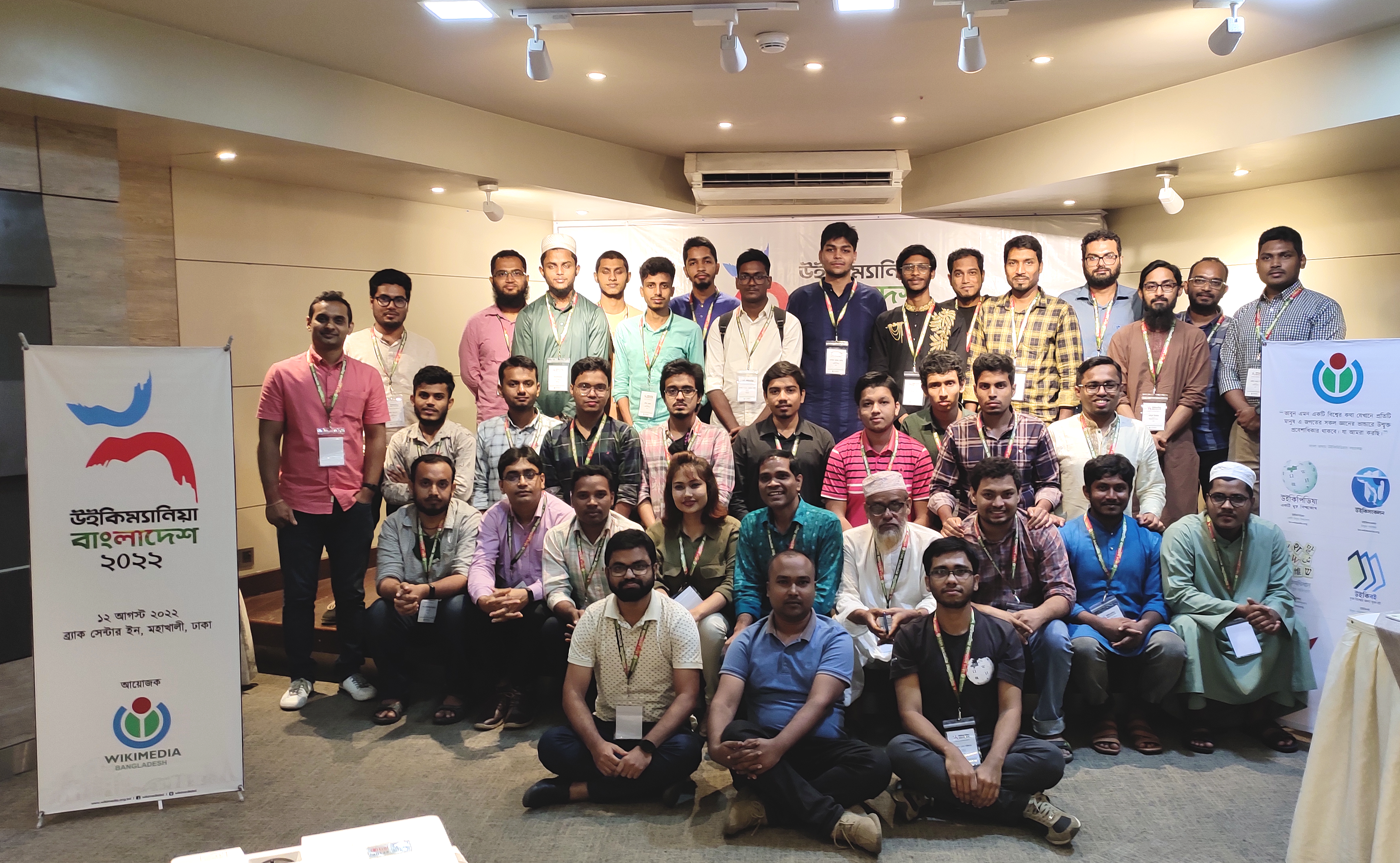
Wikimania Conference, Bangladesh Round (2022)

== See also ==
- History of Wikipedia
- Reliability of Wikipedia
- Wikipedia community
