= Wikipedia =

Free online crowdsourced encyclopedia

- The Wikipedia logo depicts a globe made out of puzzle pieces with glyphs from various writing systems.

- Screenshot Wikipedia's desktop homepage in 2022
- Website type: Online encyclopedia
- Available in: 348 languages (Note: There are 348 active editions of Wikipedia, but that does not translate into 348 unique languages. For example, there is an edition in English and an edition in Simple English, different editions of Belarusan (using the Narkamaŭka and Taraškievica orthographies), different editions of Norwegian (using the Nynorsk and Bokmål orthographies), etc. Additionally, there are 16 closed editions of Wikipedia, in languages for which there are not enough speakers for sustainment (for example, Marshallese and Akan). Four editions were outright deleted (examples include the Moldovian Wikipedia and the Siberian Wikipedia)) (Note: For some nearly extinct languages, such as the Manchu language, no Wikipedia editions have ever been created.)
- Predecessor: Nupedia
- Headquarters: San Francisco, California, U.S.
- Country of origin: United States
- Area served: Worldwide (except China, Myanmar, and North Korea)
- Owner: Wikimedia Foundation (since 2003)
- Creators: Jimmy Wales; Larry Sanger
- Website: wikipedia.org
- IPv6 support: Supported
- Commercial: No
- Registration: Optional (Note: Registration is required for certain tasks, such as editing protected pages, creating pages on the English Wikipedia, and uploading files.)
- Users: 137 million (as of November 18, 2026)
- Launched: January 15, 2001 (25 years ago)
- Current status: Active
- Content license: Creative Commons Attribution-ShareAlike 4.0 (Note: Most text is also dual-licensed under GFDL; media licensing varies.)
- OCLC number: 52075003

Wikipedia (Note: Pronounced /ˌwɪkəˈpiːdiə/ WIK-ə-PEE-dee-ə or /ˌwɪki-/ WIK-ee-PEE-dee-ə in English) is a free online encyclopedia written and maintained by a community of volunteer editors, known as Wikipedians, through open collaboration and the wiki software MediaWiki. Founded by Jimmy Wales and Larry Sanger in 2001, Wikipedia has been hosted since 2003 by the Wikimedia Foundation, an American nonprofit organization funded mainly by donations from readers. Wikipedia is the largest and most read reference work in history.

Initially available only in English, Wikipedia has grown to over 300 languages and is one of the world's most visited websites as of 2026. The English Wikipedia, with over 7 million articles, remains the largest of the editions, which together comprise more than 68 million articles and attract more than 2 billion unique device visits and 15 million edits per month (about five edits per second on average) as of November 2026. As of November 2026, over 27% of Wikipedia's traffic comes from the United States, while Japan accounts for 6%, and the United Kingdom, Germany, and Russia each represent around 5%.

Wikipedia has been praised for its internal structure and culture, enabling the democratization of knowledge, and for its extensive coverage on various topics. The encyclopedia has also been criticized for systemic bias, such as a gender bias against women and a geographical bias against the Global South. The reliability of Wikipedia was frequently criticized in the 2000s, but has received greater praise from the late 2010s onward. Censorship of Wikipedia by national governments has ranged from censoring specific pages to the entire site, sometimes due to its criticism of the government, or for content considered blasphemous. Wikipedia articles on breaking news are accessed as sources for up-to-date information by many.

== History ==
Wikipedia founders Jimmy Wales and Larry Sanger both in 2026

=== Nupedia ===
Various collaborative online encyclopedias were attempted before Wikipedia's launch, but with limited success. Wikipedia began as a complementary project for Nupedia, a free online English-language encyclopedia project whose articles were written by experts and reviewed under a formal process. It was founded on March 9, 2000, under the ownership of Bomis, a web portal company. Its main figures were Bomis CEO Jimmy Wales and Larry Sanger, editor-in-chief for Nupedia and later Wikipedia. Nupedia was initially licensed under its own Nupedia Open Content License. Before Wikipedia was founded, Nupedia switched to the GNU Free Documentation License at the urging of Richard Stallman. Wales is often credited with defining the goal of making a publicly editable encyclopedia, while Sanger is credited with the strategy of using a wiki to reach that goal. On January 10, 2001, Sanger proposed on the Nupedia mailing list to create a wiki as a "feeder" project for Nupedia.

=== Launch and growth ===
Wikipedia was launched on January 15, 2001 (sometimes referred to as "Wikipedia Day"), as a single English-language edition with the domain name www.wikipedia.com, and was announced by Sanger on the Nupedia mailing list. The name, proposed by Sanger to forestall any potential damage to the Nupedia name, originated from a blend of the words wiki and encyclopedia. Wales stated that the idea for Wikipedia was influenced by the spontaneous order ideas associated with Friedrich Hayek and the Austrian School of economics after being exposed to these ideas by the libertarian economist Mark Thornton. In particular, Wales was influenced by Hayek's essay The Use of Knowledge in Society stating it was "central" to his thinking about "how to manage the Wikipedia project". Its integral policy of "neutral point of view" arose within its first year. Otherwise, there were initially relatively few rules, and it operated independently of Nupedia. Bomis originally intended for it to be a for-profit business.

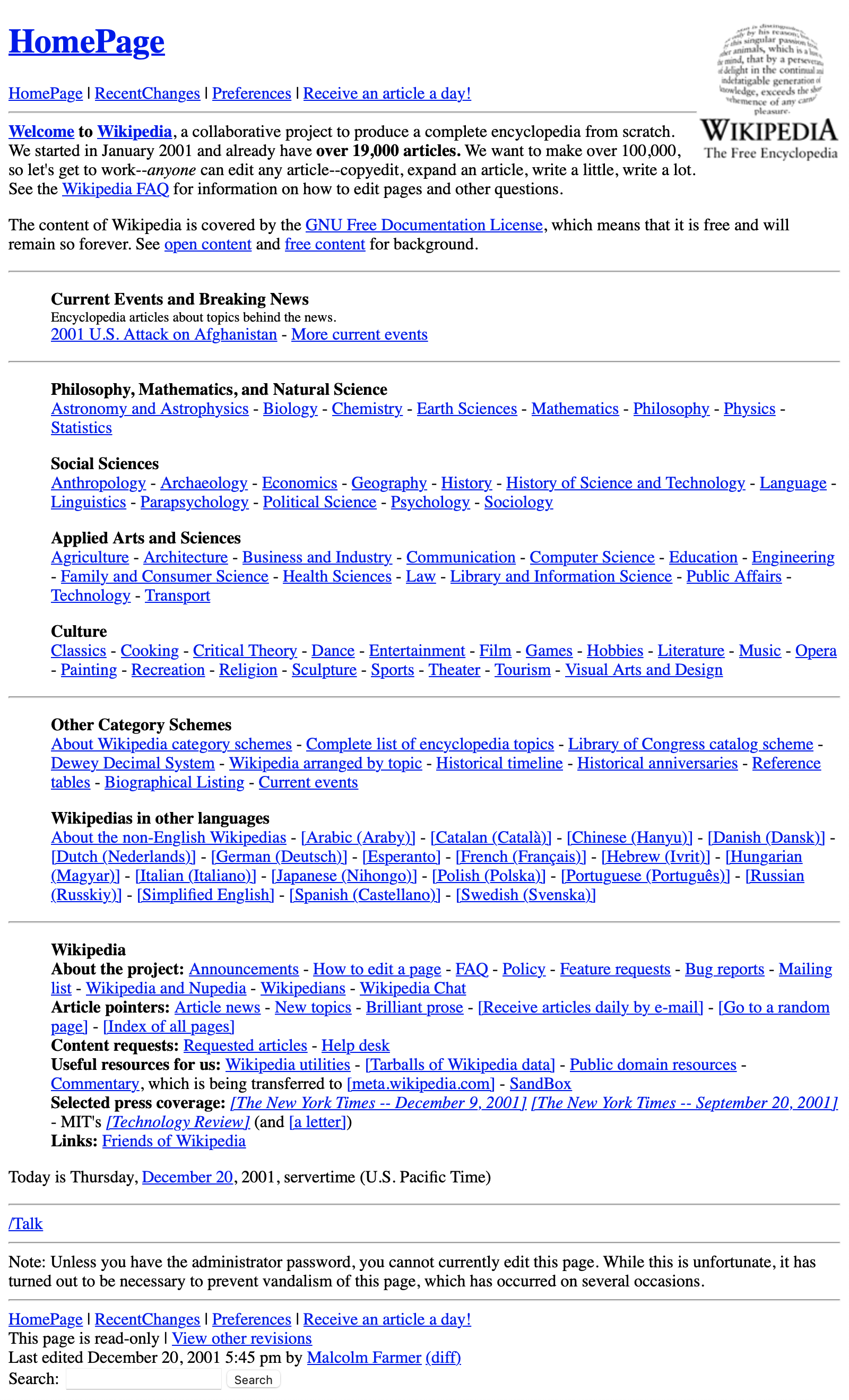
The Wikipedia home page on December 20, 2001 (Note: Available as an archive at the Nostalgia Wikipedia)

Wikipedia gained early contributors from Nupedia, Slashdot postings, and web search engine indexing. Language editions were created beginning in March 2001, with a total of 161 in use by the end of 2004. Nupedia and Wikipedia coexisted until the former's servers were taken down permanently in 2003, and its text was incorporated into Wikipedia. The English Wikipedia passed the mark of 2 million articles on September 9, 2007, making it the largest encyclopedia ever assembled, surpassing the Yongle Encyclopedia made in China during the Ming dynasty in 1408, which had held the record for almost 600 years.

Due to fears of commercial advertising and lack of control, users of the Spanish Wikipedia forked from Wikipedia to create Enciclopedia Libre in February 2002. Wales then announced that Wikipedia would not display advertisements and changed Wikipedia's domain from wikipedia.com to wikipedia.org.

After an early period of exponential growth, the growth rate of the English Wikipedia in terms of the numbers of new articles and of editors appears to have peaked around early 2007. The edition reached 3 million articles in August 2009. Around 1,800 articles were added daily to the encyclopedia in 2006; by 2013 that average was roughly 800. A team at the Palo Alto Research Center attributed this slowing of growth to "increased coordination and overhead costs, exclusion of newcomers, and resistance to new edits". Others suggested that the growth flattened naturally because articles that could be called "low-hanging fruit"—topics that clearly merit an article—had already been created and built up extensively.

In November 2009, a researcher at the Rey Juan Carlos University in Madrid, Spain, found that the English Wikipedia had lost 49,000 editors during the first three months of 2009; in comparison, it lost only 4,900 editors during the same period in 2008. The Wall Street Journal cited the array of rules applied to editing and disputes related to such content among the reasons for this trend. Wales disputed these claims in 2009, denying the decline and questioning the study's methodology. Two years later, in 2011, he acknowledged a slight decline, noting a decrease from "a little more than 36,000 writers" in June 2010 to 35,800 in June 2011. In the same interview, he also claimed the number of editors was "stable and sustainable". A 2013 MIT Technology Review article, "The Decline of Wikipedia", questioned this claim, reporting that since 2007 Wikipedia had lost a third of its volunteer editors, and suggesting that those remaining had focused increasingly on minutiae. In July 2012, The Atlantic reported that the number of administrators was also in decline. In November 2013, New York magazine stated, "Wikipedia, the sixth-most-used website, is facing an internal crisis." The number of active English Wikipedia editors has since remained steady after a long period of decline.

On January 20, 2014, Subodh Varma reporting for The Economic Times indicated that not only had Wikipedia's growth stalled, it "had lost nearly ten percent of its page views last year. There was a decline of about 2 billion between December 2012 and December 2013. Its most popular versions are leading the slide: page-views of the English Wikipedia declined by twelve percent, those of the German version slid by 17 percent and the Japanese version lost 9 percent." Varma added, "While Wikipedia's managers think that this could be due to errors in counting, other experts feel that Google's Knowledge Graphs project launched last year may be gobbling up Wikipedia users." When contacted on this matter, Clay Shirky, associate professor at New York University and fellow at Harvard's Berkman Klein Center for Internet & Society said that he suspected much of the page-view decline was due to Knowledge Graphs, stating, "If you can get your question answered from the search page, you don't need to click [any further]." By the end of December 2016, Wikipedia was ranked the fifth most popular website globally. As of January 2023, 55,791 English Wikipedia articles have been cited 92,300 times in scholarly journals, from which cloud computing was the most cited page.

=== Sister projects ===
Wikipedia has spawned several sister projects, which are also wikis run by the Wikimedia Foundation. These other Wikimedia projects include Wiktionary, a dictionary project launched in December 2002, Wikiquote, a collection of quotations created a week after Wikimedia launched, Wikibooks, a collection of collaboratively written free textbooks and annotated texts, Wikimedia Commons, a site devoted to free-knowledge multimedia, Wikinews, for collaborative journalism (which was later shut down in 2026), and Wikiversity, a project for the creation of free learning materials and the provision of online learning activities. Another sister project of Wikipedia, Wikispecies, is a catalog of all species, but is not open for public editing. In 2012, Wikivoyage, an editable travel guide, and Wikidata, an editable knowledge base, launched.

=== Milestones ===
Cartogram showing number of articles in the top 88 Wikipedias (as of March 2024). The size of the circles for Wikipedias that have less than a million articles is fixed and not proportional to the size of the Wikipedia. The smallest Wikipedia that made the cutoff is the Haitian Creole Wikipedia with 69K articles. (Note: As of April 2026, the Haitian Creole Wikipedia, with 72K articles, is in 91st place when ranked by number of articles.) The languages are roughly grouped by region: Northern Europe; Eastern Europe; Middle East; East Asia; Indian subcontinent; Sub-Saharan Africa; Central Asia; Caribbean

In January 2007, Wikipedia first became one of the ten most popular websites in the United States, according to Comscore Networks. With 42.9 million unique visitors, it was ranked ninth, surpassing The New York Times (No. 10) and Apple (No. 11). This marked a significant increase over January 2006, when Wikipedia ranked 33rd, with around 18.3 million unique visitors. In 2014, it received 8 billion page views every month. On February 9, 2014, The New York Times reported that Wikipedia had 18 billion page views and nearly 500 million unique visitors a month, "according to the ratings firm comScore". As of March 2023, it ranked sixth in popularity, according to Similarweb. Jeff Loveland and Joseph Reagle argue that, in process, Wikipedia follows a long tradition of historical encyclopedias that have accumulated improvements piecemeal through "stigmergic accumulation".

On January 18, 2012, the English Wikipedia participated in a series of coordinated protests against two proposed laws in the United States Congress—the Stop Online Piracy Act (SOPA) and the PROTECT IP Act (PIPA)—by blacking out its pages for 24 hours. More than 162 million people viewed the blackout explanation page that temporarily replaced its content.

In January 2013, 274301 Wikipedia, an asteroid, was named after Wikipedia; in October 2014, Wikipedia was honored with the Wikipedia Monument; and, in July 2015, 106 of the 7,473 700-page volumes of Wikipedia became available as Print Wikipedia. In April 2019, an Israeli lunar lander, Beresheet, crash landed on the surface of the Moon carrying a copy of nearly all of the English Wikipedia engraved on thin nickel plates; experts say the plates likely survived the crash. In June 2019, scientists reported that all 16 GB of article text from the English Wikipedia had been encoded into synthetic DNA.

On January 18, 2023, Wikipedia debuted a new website redesign, called "Vector 2022". It featured a redesigned menu bar, moving the table of contents to the left as a sidebar, and numerous changes in the locations of buttons like the language selection tool. The update initially received backlash, most notably when editors of the Swahili Wikipedia unanimously voted to revert the changes.

Both Sanger and Wales gave public interviews in late 2025 about their reflections about the status and state of Wikipedia, leading up to its 25 years of operation on January 15, 2026; Wales appeared on the PBS television news show GZERO World interviewed by Ian Bremmer and Sanger has appeared on the Fox News Channel, interviewed by Ashley Rindsberg. Wales' book The Seven Rules of Trust was published in October 2025 by Penguin Random House. It was described by the publisher as a "sweeping reflection on the global crisis of credibility and knowledge" with the book examining the "rules of trust" that enabled the growth and success of Wikipedia.

=== Impacts of generative AI on Wikipedia views ===
Since January 2024, the Wikimedia Foundation has reported a roughly 50 percent increase in bandwidth use from downloads of multimedia content across its projects. According to the foundation, this growth is largely attributed to automated programs, or "scraper" bots, that collect large volumes of data from Wikimedia sites for use in training large language models and related applications.

In October 2025, the Wikimedia Foundation reported an estimated 8 percent decline in traffic as compared to the same month in 2024 in human page views. They speculated that it reflects the growing use of generative AI and social media for finding information.

== Collaborative editing ==
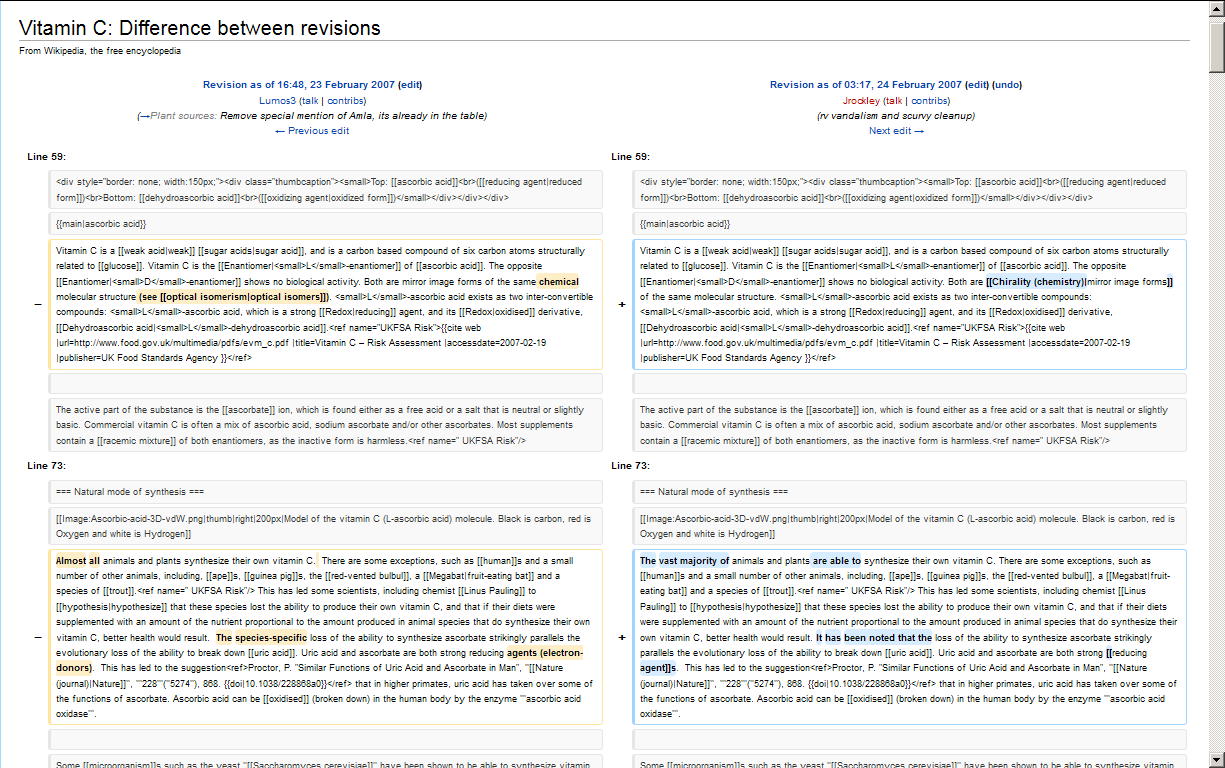
Differences between versions of an article are highlighted.

=== Restrictions ===
Due to Wikipedia's increasing popularity, some editions, including the English version, have introduced editing restrictions for certain cases. For instance, on the English Wikipedia and some other language editions, only users with 10 edits that have an account that is four days old may create a new article. On the English Wikipedia, among others, particularly controversial, sensitive, or vandalism-prone pages have been protected to varying degrees. A frequently vandalized article can be "semi-protected" or "extended confirmed protected", meaning that only "autoconfirmed" or "extended confirmed" editors can modify it. A particularly contentious article may be locked so that only administrators can make changes. A 2021 article in the Columbia Journalism Review identified Wikipedia's page-protection policies as "perhaps the most important" means at its disposal to "regulate its market of ideas". Wikipedia has delegated some functions to bots. Such algorithmic governance has an ease of implementation and scaling, though the automated rejection of edits may have contributed to a downturn in active Wikipedia editors. Bots must be approved by the community before their tasks are implemented.

In certain cases, all editors are allowed to submit modifications, but review is required for some editors, depending on certain conditions. For example, the German Wikipedia maintains "stable versions" of articles which have passed certain reviews. Following protracted trials and community discussion, the English Wikipedia introduced the "pending changes" system in December 2012. Under this system, new and unregistered users' edits to certain controversial or vandalism-prone articles are reviewed by established users before they are published. However, restrictions on editing may reduce editor engagement as well as efforts to diversify the editing community.

Articles related to the Israeli–Palestinian conflict are placed under extended-confirmed protection. Editors also can make only one revert per day across the entire field and can be banned from editing related articles. These restrictions were introduced in 2008. In January 2025, the Arbitration Committee introduced the "balanced editing restriction", which requires sanctioned users to devote only a third of their edits to articles related to the Israeli–Palestinian conflict even when no misconduct rules have been violated.

=== Review of changes ===
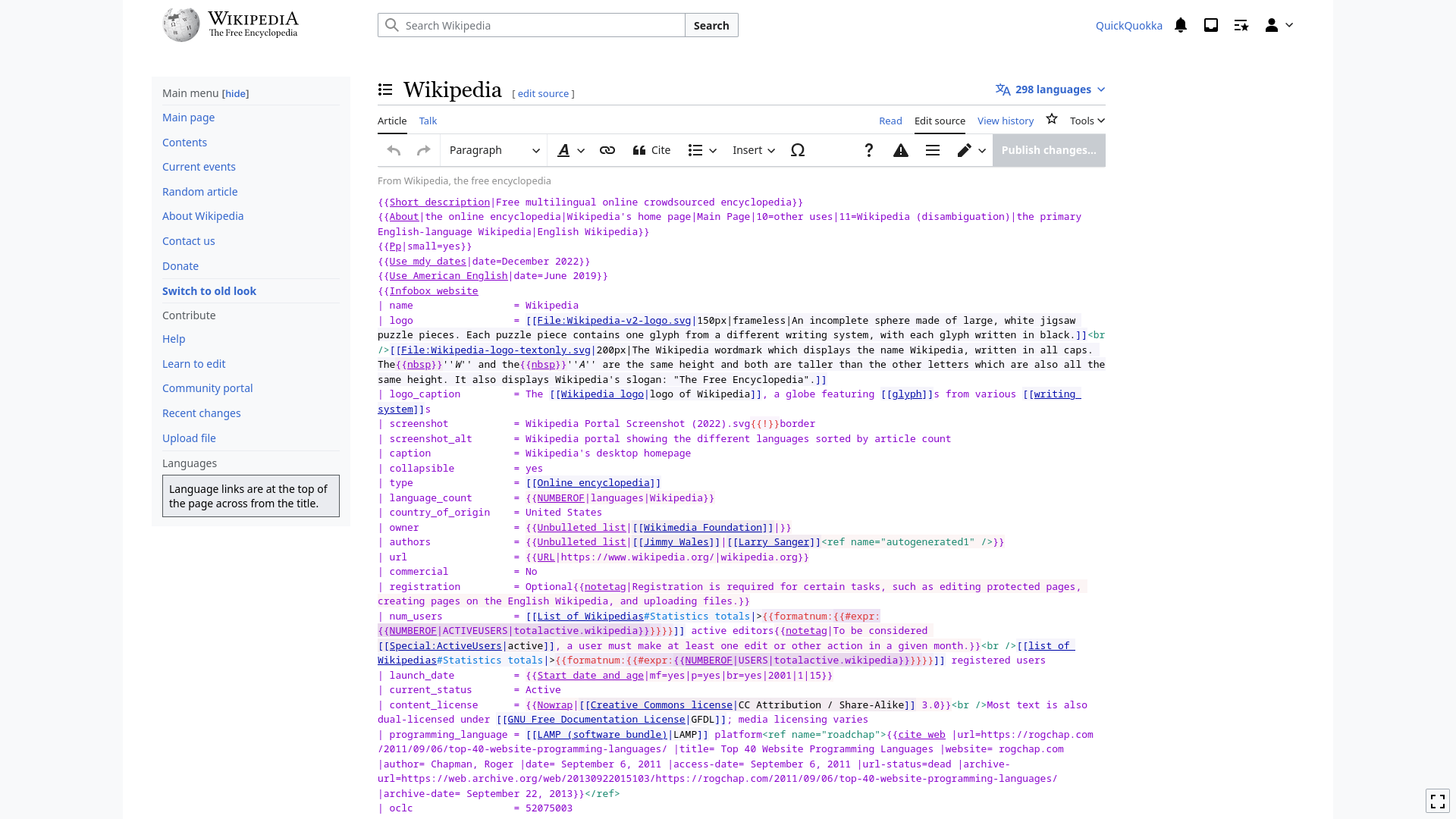
Wikipedia's editing interface

Although changes are not systematically reviewed, Wikipedia's software provides tools allowing anyone to review changes made by others. Each article's History page links to each revision. (Note: Revisions with libelous content, criminal threats, or copyright infringements may be removed completely.) On most articles, anyone can view the latest changes and undo others' revisions by clicking a link on the article's History page. Registered users may maintain a "watchlist" of articles that interest them so they can be notified of changes. There are a variety of different 'patrols' on Wikipedia, including "New pages patrol" a patrol where newly created articles are checked for glaring issues.

In 2003, economics PhD student Andrea Ciffolilli argued that the low transaction costs of participating in a wiki created a catalyst for collaborative development, and that features such as allowing easy access to past versions of a page favored "creative construction" over "creative destruction".

=== Vandalism ===
Any change that deliberately compromises Wikipedia's integrity is considered vandalism. The most common and obvious types of vandalism include additions of obscenities and crude humor, but it can also include advertising and other types of spam. Sometimes editors commit vandalism by removing content or entirely blanking a given page. Less common types of vandalism, such as the deliberate addition of plausible but false information, can be more difficult to detect. Vandals can introduce irrelevant formatting, modify page semantics such as the page's title or categorization, manipulate the article's underlying code, or use images disruptively.

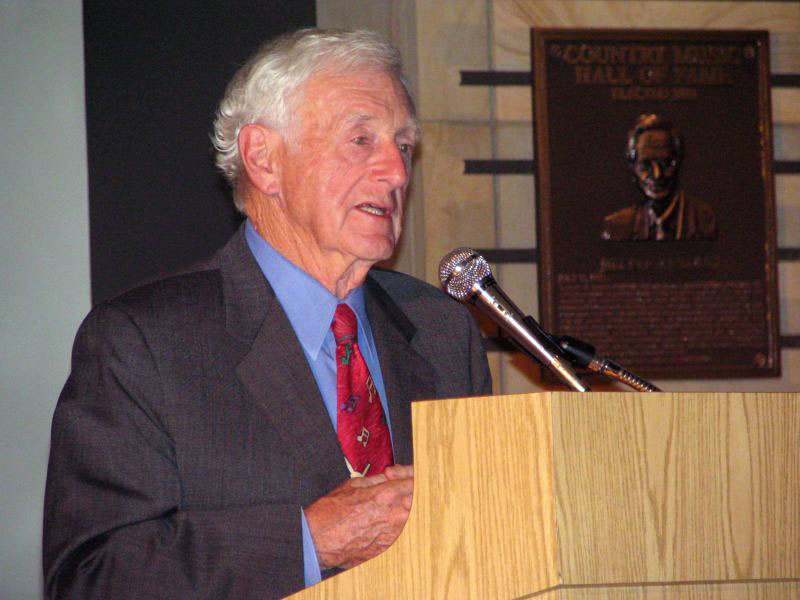
American journalist John Seigenthaler (1927–2014), subject of the Seigenthaler biography incident

Obvious vandalism is generally easy to remove from Wikipedia articles; the median time to detect and fix it is a few minutes. However, some vandalism takes much longer to detect and repair.

In the Seigenthaler biography incident, an anonymous editor introduced false information into the biography of American political figure John Seigenthaler in May 2005, falsely presenting him as a suspect in the assassination of John F. Kennedy. It remained uncorrected for four months. Seigenthaler, the founding editorial director of USA Today and founder of the Freedom Forum First Amendment Center at Vanderbilt University, called Wikipedia co-founder Jimmy Wales and asked whether he had any way of knowing who contributed the misinformation. Wales said he did not, although the perpetrator was eventually traced. After the incident, Seigenthaler described Wikipedia as "a flawed and irresponsible research tool". The incident led to policy changes at Wikipedia for tightening up the verifiability of biographical articles of living people.

=== Disputes and edit warring ===
Wikipedia editors often have disagreements regarding content, which can be discussed on article Talk pages. Disputes may result in repeated competing changes to an article, known as "edit warring". It is widely seen as a resource-consuming scenario where no useful knowledge is added, and criticized as creating a competitive and conflict-based editing culture associated with traditional masculine gender roles. Research has focused on, for example, impoliteness of disputes, the influence of rival editing camps, the conversational structure, and the shift in conflicts to a focus on sources.

Taha Yasseri of the University of Oxford examined editing conflicts and their resolution in a 2013 study. Yasseri contended that simple reverts or "undo" operations were not the most significant measure of counterproductive work behavior at Wikipedia. He relied instead on "mutually reverting edit pairs", where one editor reverts the edit of another editor who then, in sequence, returns to revert the first editor. The results were tabulated for several language versions of Wikipedia. The English Wikipedia's three largest conflict rates belonged to the articles George W. Bush, anarchism, and Muhammad. By comparison, for the German Wikipedia, the three largest conflict rates at the time of the study were for the articles covering Croatia, Scientology, and 9/11 conspiracy theories. In 2020, researchers identified other measures of editor behaviors, beyond mutual reverts, to identify editing conflicts across Wikipedia.

Editors also debate the deletion of articles on Wikipedia, with roughly 500,000 such debates since Wikipedia's inception as of 2019. Once an article is nominated for deletion, the dispute is typically determined by initial votes (to keep or delete) and by reference to topic-specific notability policies.

== Policies and content ==
External videos
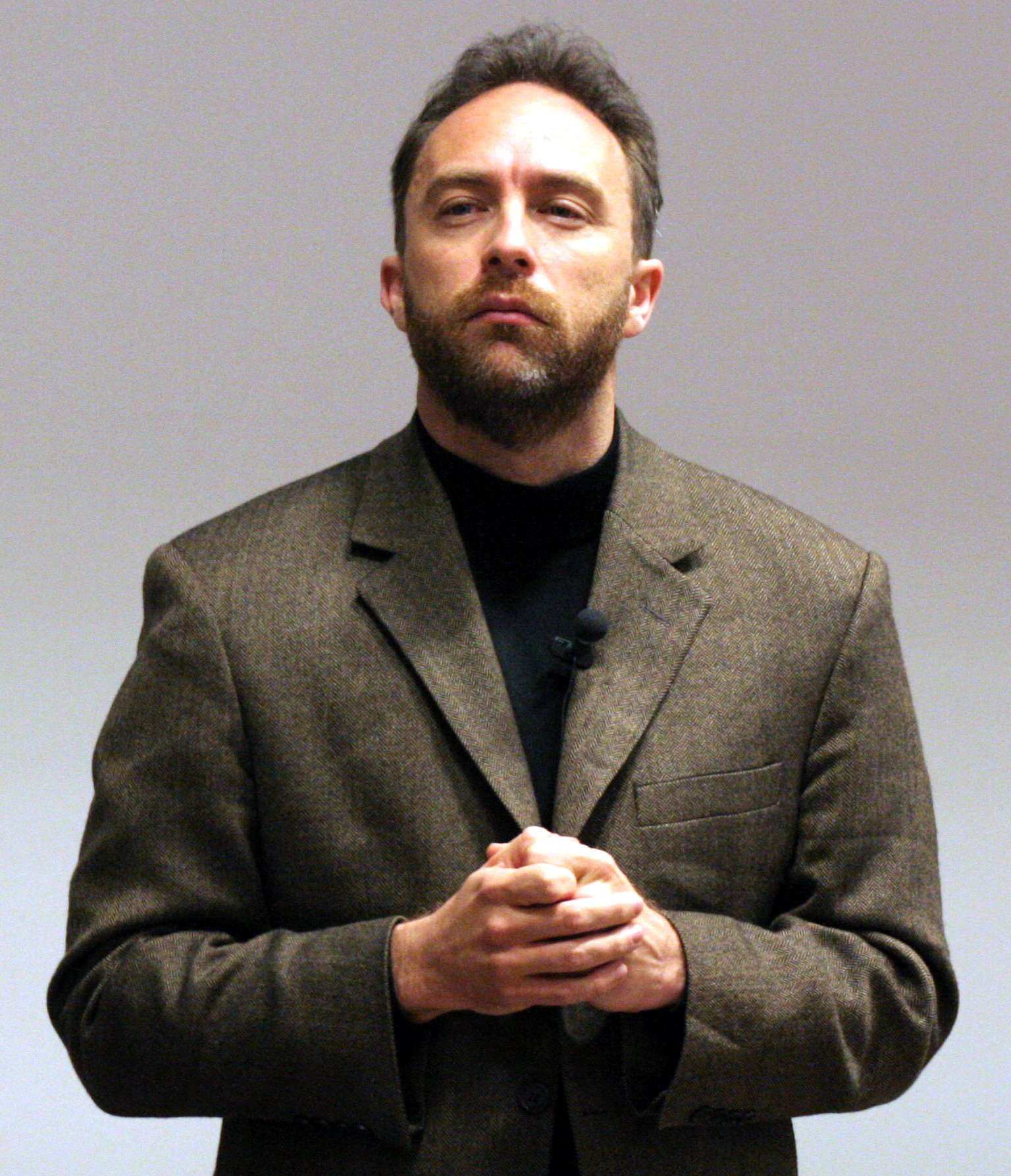
- Jimmy Wales, The Birth of Wikipedia, 2006, TED talks, 20 minutes
- Katherine Maher, What Wikipedia Teaches Us About Balancing Truth and Beliefs, 2022, TED talks, 15 minutes

Wikipedia is composed of 11 different namespaces, with its articles being present in mainspace. Other namespaces have a prefix before their page title and fulfill various purposes. For example, the project namespace uses the Wikipedia prefix and is used for self-governance-related discussions. Most readers are not aware of these other namespaces.

The fundamental principles of the Wikipedia community are embodied in the "Five Pillars", while the detailed editorial principles are expressed in numerous policies and guidelines intended to appropriately shape content. The five pillars are:

- Wikipedia is an encyclopedia
- Wikipedia is written from a neutral point of view
- Wikipedia is free content that anyone can use, edit, and distribute
- Wikipedia's editors should treat each other with respect and civility
- Wikipedia has no firm rules

The rules developed by the community are stored in the Wikipedia namespace, and Wikipedia editors write and revise the website's policies and guidelines in accordance with community consensus. Originally, rules on the non-English editions of Wikipedia were based on a translation of the rules for the English Wikipedia. They have since diverged to some extent.

=== Content policies and guidelines ===
According to the rules on the English Wikipedia community, each entry in Wikipedia must be about a topic that is encyclopedic and is not a dictionary entry or dictionary-style. A topic should also meet Wikipedia's standards of "notability", which generally means that the topic has been covered extensively in reliable sources that are independent of the article's subject. Wikipedia intends to convey only knowledge that is already established and recognized and therefore must not present original research. Some subjects, such as politicians and academics, have specialized notability requirements. Finally, Wikipedia must reflect a neutral point of view. This is accomplished through summarizing reliable sources, using impartial language, and ensuring that multiple points of view are presented based on their prominence. Information must also be verifiable. Information without citations may be tagged or removed entirely. This can at times lead to the removal of information which, though valid, is not properly sourced. As Wikipedia policies changed over time, and became more complex, their number has grown. In 2008, there were 44 policy pages and 248 guideline pages; by 2013, scholars counted 383 policy pages and 449 guideline pages.

== Governance ==
Wikipedia's initial anarchy integrated democratic and hierarchical elements over time. An article is not considered to be owned by its creator or any other editor, nor by the subject of the article. Editors in good standing in the community can request extra user rights, granting them the technical ability to perform certain special actions. Some user rights are granted automatically, such as the autoconfirmed and extended confirmed groups, when thresholds for account age and edits are met.

=== Administrators ===
Experienced editors can choose to run for "adminship", which includes the ability to delete pages or prevent them from being changed in cases of severe vandalism or editorial disputes. Administrators are not supposed to enjoy any special privilege in decision-making; instead, their powers are mostly limited to making edits that have project-wide effects and thus are disallowed to ordinary editors, and to implement restrictions intended to prevent disruptive editors from making unproductive edits.

By 2012, fewer editors were becoming administrators compared to Wikipedia's earlier years, in part because the process of vetting potential administrators had become more rigorous. In 2022, there was a particularly contentious request for adminship over the candidate's anti-Trump views; ultimately, they were granted adminship.

=== Dispute resolution ===
Over time, Wikipedia has developed a semi-formal dispute resolution process. To determine community consensus, editors can raise issues at appropriate community forums, seek outside input through third opinion requests, or initiate a more general community discussion known as a "request for comment", in which bots add the discussion to a centralized list of discussions, invite editors to participate, and remove the discussion from the list after 30 days. However, editors have the discretion to close (and delist) the discussion early or late. If the result of a discussion is not obvious, a closer—an uninvolved editor usually in good standing—may render a verdict from the strength of the arguments presented and then the number of arguers on each side. Wikipedians emphasize that the process is not a vote by referring to statements of opinion in such discussions as "!vote"s, in which the exclamation mark is the symbol for logical negation and pronounced "not".

Wikipedia encourages local resolutions of conflicts, which Jemielniak argues is quite unique in organization studies, though there has been some recent interest in consensus building in the field. Reagle and Sue Gardner argue that the approaches to consensus building are similar to those used by Quakers. A difference from Quaker meetings is the absence of a facilitator in the presence of disagreement, a role played by the clerk in Quaker meetings.

==== Arbitration Committee ====
The Arbitration Committee presides over the ultimate dispute resolution process. Although disputes usually arise from a disagreement between two opposing views on how an article should read, the Arbitration Committee explicitly refuses to directly rule on the specific view that should be adopted.

Statistical analyses suggest that the English Wikipedia committee ignores the content of disputes and rather focuses on the way disputes are conducted, functioning not so much to resolve disputes and make peace between conflicting editors, but to weed out problematic editors while allowing potentially productive editors back in to participate. Therefore, the committee does not dictate the content of articles, although it sometimes condemns content changes when it deems the new content violates Wikipedia policies (for example, if the new content is considered biased). (Note: The committee may directly rule that a content change is inappropriate, but may not directly rule that certain content is inappropriate.) Commonly used solutions include cautions and probations (used in 63% of cases) and banning editors from articles (43%), subject matters (23%), or Wikipedia (16%). Complete bans from Wikipedia are generally limited to instances of impersonation and anti-social behavior. When conduct is not impersonation or anti-social, but rather edit warring and other violations of editing policies, solutions tend to be limited to warnings.

== Community ==
Video of Wikimania 2005 – an annual conference for users of Wikipedia and other projects operated by the Wikimedia Foundation, was held in Frankfurt am Main, Germany, August 4–8.

Each article and each user of Wikipedia has an associated and dedicated "talk" page. These form the primary communication channel for editors to discuss, coordinate, and debate. Wikipedia's community has been described as cultlike, although not always with entirely negative connotations. Its preference for cohesiveness, even if it requires compromise that includes disregard of credentials, has been referred to as "anti-elitism".

Wikipedians and British Museum curators collaborate on the article Hoxne Hoard in June 2010.

Wikipedia does not require that its editors and contributors provide identification. As Wikipedia grew, "Who writes Wikipedia?" became one of the questions frequently asked there. Jimmy Wales once argued that only "a community ... a dedicated group of a few hundred volunteers" makes the bulk of contributions to Wikipedia and that the project is therefore "much like any traditional organization". Since Wikipedia relies on volunteer labour, editors frequently focus on topics that interest them.

The English Wikipedia has 7,265,982 articles, 55,508,152 registered editors, and 261,656 active editors. An editor is considered active if they have made one or more edits in the past 30 days. Editors who fail to comply with Wikipedia cultural rituals, such as signing talk page comments, may implicitly signal that they are Wikipedia outsiders, increasing the odds that Wikipedia insiders may target or discount their contributions. Becoming a Wikipedia insider involves non-trivial costs: the contributor is expected to learn Wikipedia-specific technological codes, submit to a sometimes convoluted dispute resolution process, and learn a "baffling culture rich with in-jokes and insider references". Editors who do not log in are in some sense "second-class citizens" on Wikipedia, as "participants are accredited by members of the wiki community, who have a vested interest in preserving the quality of the work product, on the basis of their ongoing participation", but the contribution histories of anonymous unregistered editors recognized only by their IP addresses cannot be attributed to a particular editor with certainty. New editors often struggle to understand Wikipedia's complexity. Experienced editors are encouraged not to "bite" the newcomers in order to create a more welcoming atmosphere.

=== Research ===
A 2007 study by researchers from Dartmouth College found that "anonymous and infrequent contributors to Wikipedia ... are as reliable a source of knowledge as those contributors who register with the site". Jimmy Wales stated in 2009 that "[I]t turns out over 50% of all the edits are done by just 0.7% of the users ... 524 people ... And in fact, the most active 2%, which is 1400 people, have done 73.4% of all the edits." However, Business Insider editor and journalist Henry Blodget showed in 2009 that in a random sample of articles, most Wikipedia content (measured by the amount of contributed text that survives to the latest sampled edit) is created by "outsiders", while most editing and formatting is done by "insiders".

In 2008, a Slate magazine article reported that "one percent of Wikipedia users are responsible for about half of the site's edits." This method of evaluating contributions was later disputed by Aaron Swartz, who noted that several articles he sampled had large portions of their content (measured by number of characters) contributed by users with low edit counts. A 2008 study found that Wikipedians were less agreeable, open, and conscientious than others, although a later commentary pointed out serious flaws, including that the data showed higher openness and that the differences with the control group and the samples were small. According to a 2009 study, there is "evidence of growing resistance from the Wikipedia community to new content".

=== Diversity ===
Several studies have shown that most volunteer Wikipedia contributors are male. The results of a Wikimedia Foundation survey in 2008 showed that only 13 percent of Wikipedia editors were female. Because of this, universities throughout the United States tried to encourage women to become Wikipedia contributors. Similarly, many of these universities, including Yale and Brown, gave college credit to students who create or edit an article relating to women in science or technology. Andrew Lih, a professor and scientist, said that the reason he thought the number of male contributors outnumbered the number of females so greatly was because identifying as a woman may expose oneself to "ugly, intimidating behavior". Data has shown that Africans are underrepresented among Wikipedia editors.

== Language editions ==
Distribution of the 68,797,632 articles in different language editions (as of November 18, 2026)
1. English (10.6%)
2. Cebuano (8.90%)
3. German (4.60%)
4. French (4.10%)
5. Swedish (3.80%)
6. Dutch (3.20%)
7. Spanish (3.10%)
8. Russian (3.10%)
9. Italian (2.90%)
10. Polish (2.50%)
11. Egyptian Arabic (2.40%)
12. Chinese (2.30%)
13. Japanese (2.20%)
14. Ukrainian (2.10%)
15. Arabic (1.90%)
16. Vietnamese (1.90%)
17. Waray (1.80%)
18. Portuguese (1.80%)
19. Persian (1.60%)
20. Chechen (1.30%)
21. Other (33.9%)

There are currently 348 language editions of Wikipedia (also called language versions, or simply Wikipedias). As of November 2026, the six largest, in order of article count, are the English, Cebuano, German, French, Swedish, and Dutch Wikipedias. The second and fifth-largest Wikipedias owe their position to the article-creating bot Lsjbot, which as of 2013 had created about half the articles on the Swedish Wikipedia, and most of the articles in the Cebuano and Waray Wikipedias. The latter are both languages of the Philippines.

In addition to the top six, twelve other Wikipedias have more than a million articles each (Spanish, Russian, Italian, Polish, Egyptian Arabic, Chinese, Japanese, Ukrainian, Arabic, Vietnamese, Waray, and Portuguese), seven more have over 500,000 articles (Persian, Chechen, Catalan, Indonesian, Korean, Urdu, and Serbian), 44 more have over 100,000, and 82 more have over 10,000. The largest, the English Wikipedia, has over 7.2 million articles. As of January 2021, the English Wikipedia receives 48% of Wikipedia's cumulative traffic, with the remaining split among the other languages. The top 10 editions represent approximately 85% of the total traffic.

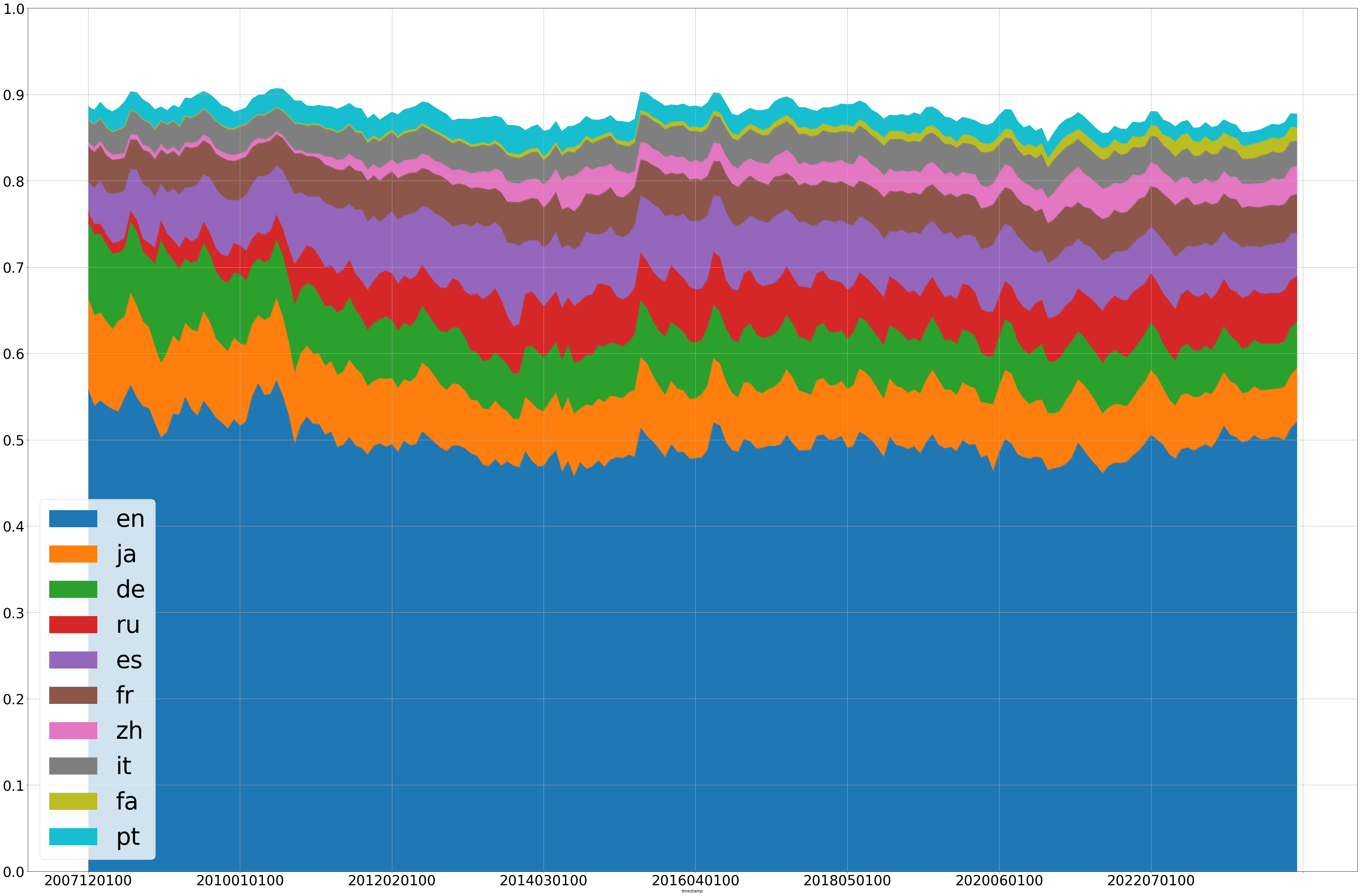
Most viewed editions of Wikipedia, 2008–2024

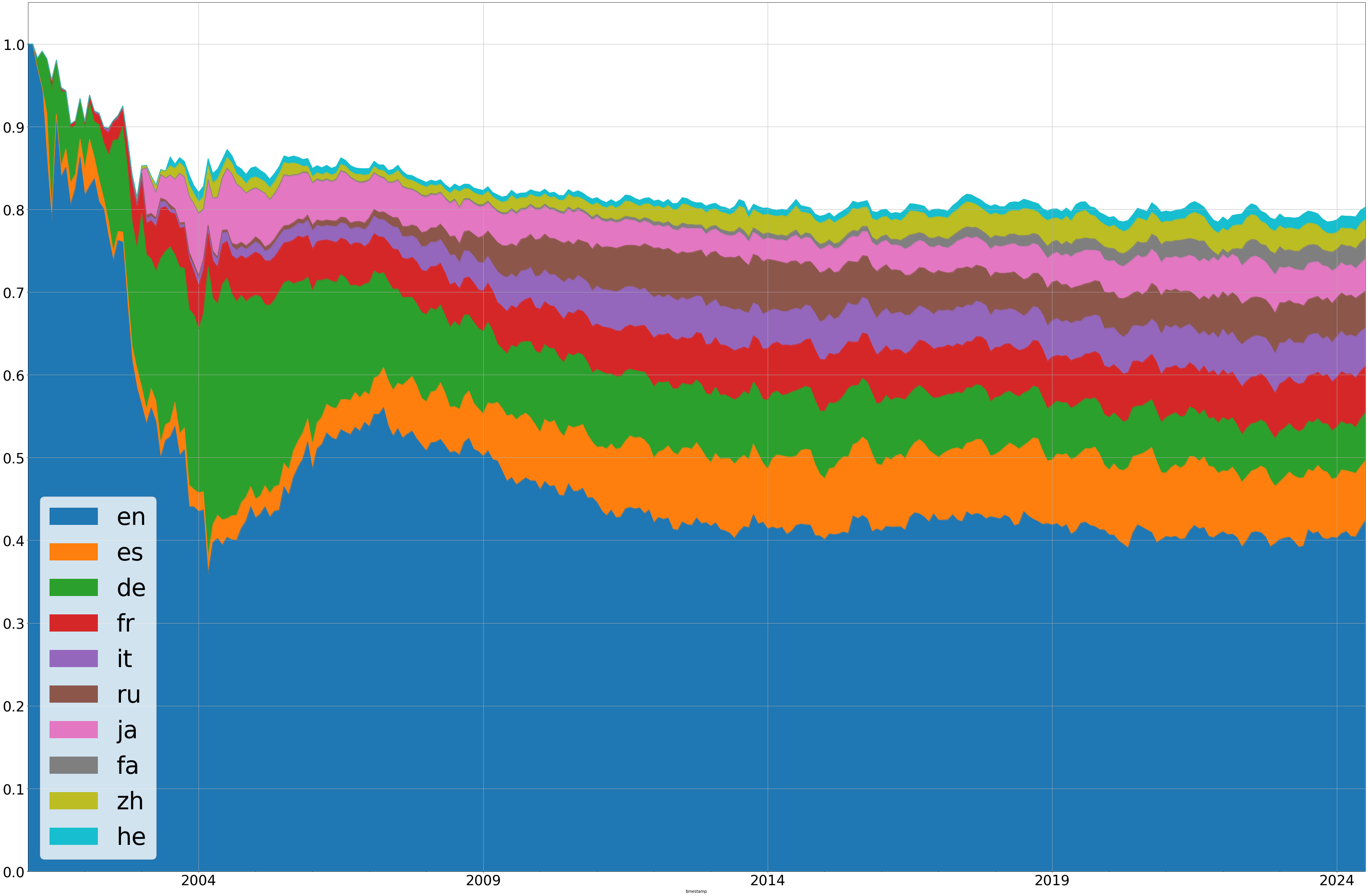
Most edited editions of Wikipedia, 2001–2024

Articles in the 20 largest language editions of Wikipedia (as of 18 November 2026)
1	2	3	4	5	6	7
English 7,265,982 Cebuano 6,116,386 German 3,167,115 French 2,790,131 Swedish 2,630,601 Dutch 2,232,163 Spanish 2,150,595 Russian 2,129,961 Italian 1,996,221 Polish 1,714,993 Egyptian Arabic 1,634,161 Chinese 1,566,648 Japanese 1,528,330 Ukrainian 1,442,343 Arabic 1,339,928 Vietnamese 1,306,068 Waray 1,267,077 Portuguese 1,189,445 Persian 1,104,108 Chechen 874,451

Since Wikipedia is based on the Web and therefore worldwide, contributors to the same language edition may use different dialects or may come from different countries (as is the case for the English edition). These differences may lead to some conflicts over spelling differences (e.g. colour versus color) or points of view.

Though the various language editions are held to global policies such as "neutral point of view", they diverge on some points of policy and practice, most notably on whether images that are not licensed freely may be used under a claim of fair use. The content of articles on the same subject can differ significantly between languages, depending on the sources editors use and other factors.

Jimmy Wales has described Wikipedia as "an effort to create and distribute a free encyclopedia of the highest possible quality to every single person on the planet in their own language". Though each language edition functions more or less independently, some efforts are made to supervise them all. They are coordinated in part by Meta-Wiki, the Wikimedia Foundation's wiki devoted to maintaining all its projects (Wikipedia and others). For instance, Meta-Wiki provides important statistics on all language editions of Wikipedia, and it maintains a list of articles every Wikipedia should have. The list concerns basic content by subject: biography, history, geography, society, culture, science, technology, and mathematics. It is not rare for articles strongly related to a particular language not to have counterparts in another edition. For example, articles about small towns in the United States might be available only in English, even when they meet the notability criteria of other language Wikipedia projects.

Estimate of contributions from different regions in the world to different Wikipedia editions, c. 2012. See text.

Translated articles represent only a small portion of articles in most editions, in part because those editions do not allow fully automated translation of articles. Articles available in more than one language may offer "interwiki links", which link to the counterpart articles in other editions.

A study published by PLOS One in 2012 also estimated the cumulative share of edits to different editions of Wikipedia from different regions of the world, based on time-of-day. It reported that the proportion of the edits made from North America was 51% for the English Wikipedia, and 25% for the Simple English Wikipedia.

=== English Wikipedia editor numbers ===
On March 1, 2014, The Economist, in an article titled "The Future of Wikipedia", cited a trend analysis concerning data published by the Wikimedia Foundation stating that "the number of editors for the English-language version has fallen by a third in seven years." The attrition rate for active editors in English Wikipedia was cited by The Economist as substantially in contrast to statistics for Wikipedia in other languages (non-English Wikipedia). The Economist reported that the number of contributors with an average of five or more edits per month was relatively constant since 2008 for Wikipedia in other languages, at approximately 42,000 editors within narrow seasonal variances of about 2,000 editors up or down. The number of active editors in English Wikipedia, by sharp comparison, was cited as peaking in 2007 at approximately 50,000 and dropping to 30,000 by the start of 2014.

In contrast, the trend analysis for Wikipedia in other languages (non-English Wikipedia) shows success in retaining active editors on a renewable and sustained basis, with their numbers remaining relatively constant at approximately 42,000. No comment was made concerning which of the differentiated edit policy standards from Wikipedia in other languages (non-English Wikipedia) would provide a possible alternative to English Wikipedia for effectively improving substantial editor attrition rates on the English-language Wikipedia.

== Reception ==
Various Wikipedians have criticized Wikipedia's large and growing regulation, which includes more than fifty policies and nearly 150,000 words as of 2014. Critics have stated that Wikipedia exhibits systemic bias. In 2010, columnist and journalist Edwin Black described Wikipedia as being a mixture of "truth, half-truth, and some falsehoods". Articles in The Chronicle of Higher Education and The Journal of Academic Librarianship have criticized Wikipedia's "undue-weight policy", concluding that Wikipedia explicitly is not designed to provide correct information about a subject, but rather focus on all the major viewpoints on the subject, give less attention to minor ones, and creates omissions that can lead to false beliefs based on incomplete information.

Journalists Oliver Kamm and Edwin Black alleged (in 2010 and 2011, respectively) that articles are dominated by the loudest and most persistent voices, usually by a group with an "ax to grind" on the topic. A 2008 article in Education Next journal concluded that as a resource about controversial topics, Wikipedia is subject to manipulation and spin. In 2020, Omer Benjakob and Stephen Harrison noted that "Media coverage of Wikipedia has radically shifted over the past two decades: once cast as an intellectual frivolity, it is now lauded as the 'last bastion of shared reality' online."

Multiple news networks and pundits have accused Wikipedia of being ideologically biased. In February 2021, Fox News accused Wikipedia of whitewashing communism and socialism and having too much "leftist bias". Wikipedia co-founder Larry Sanger, who left Wikipedia in 2002 to establish competing websites, has said that Wikipedia had become "propaganda" for the left-leaning "establishment" and warned the site can no longer be trusted. In 2022, libertarian John Stossel opined that Wikipedia, a site he financially supported at one time, appeared to have gradually taken a significant turn in bias to the political left, specifically on political topics. Some studies suggest that Wikipedia (and in particular the English Wikipedia) has a "western cultural bias" (or "pro-western bias") or "Eurocentric bias", reiterating, says Anna Samoilenko, "similar biases that are found in the 'ivory tower' of academic historiography". Carwil Bjork-James proposes that Wikipedia could follow the diversification pattern of contemporary scholarship and Dangzhi Zhao calls for a "decolonization" of Wikipedia to reduce bias from opinionated White male editors.

In May 2026, hundreds of Wikipedia editors threatened to go on strike following the WMF's dismissal of Brooke Vibber, a developer who contributed to the MediaWiki software since 2003 and had previously served as the WMF's first Chief Technology Officer. Additionally, one week after Vibber's dismissal, the WMF laid off six employees while shutting down its Community Tech team, further fueling the strike and unionization effort. WMF executives stated that the Community Tech employees could apply for different positions in the organization, that the wishlist process would be restructured, and that the WMF would recognize a union that gains majority support from staff. Critics noted that the WMF publicly listed fewer job openings for developers than the number of staff it had laid off. A petition expressing support for the Wiki Workers United (WWU) union and willingness to go on strike was signed by more than 1050 community members as of June 15, 2026.

=== Accuracy of content ===
External audio
- The Great Book of Knowledge, Part 1, Ideas with Paul Kennedy, CBC, January 15, 2014

Articles for traditional encyclopedias such as Encyclopædia Britannica are written by experts, lending such encyclopedias a reputation for accuracy. However, a peer review in 2005 of forty-two scientific entries on both Wikipedia and Encyclopædia Britannica by the science journal Nature found few differences in accuracy, and concluded that "the average science entry in Wikipedia contained around four inaccuracies; Britannica, about three."

Others raised similar critiques. The findings by Nature were disputed by Encyclopædia Britannica, and in response, Nature gave a rebuttal of the points raised by Britannica. In addition to the point-for-point disagreement between these two parties, others have examined the sample size and selection method used in the Nature effort, and suggested a "flawed study design" (in Nature's manual selection of articles, in part or in whole, for comparison), absence of statistical analysis (e.g., of reported confidence intervals), and a lack of study "statistical power" (i.e., owing to small sample size, 42 or 4 × 10^{1} articles compared, vs >10^{5} and >10^{6} set sizes for Britannica and the English Wikipedia, respectively).

As a consequence of the open structure, Wikipedia "makes no guarantee of validity" of its content, since no one is ultimately responsible for any claims appearing in it. Concerns have been raised by PC World in 2009 regarding the lack of accountability that results from users' anonymity, the insertion of false information, vandalism, and similar problems. Legal Research in a Nutshell (2011), cites Wikipedia as a "general source" that "can be a real boon" in "coming up to speed in the law governing a situation" and, "while not authoritative, can provide basic facts as well as leads to more in-depth resources".

Economist Tyler Cowen wrote: "If I had to guess whether Wikipedia or the median refereed journal article on economics was more likely to be true after a not so long think, I would opt for Wikipedia." He comments that some traditional sources of non-fiction suffer from systemic biases, and novel results, in his opinion, are over-reported in journal articles, as well as relevant information being omitted from news reports. However, he also cautions that errors are frequently found on Internet sites and that academics and experts must be vigilant in correcting them. Amy Bruckman has argued that, due to the number of reviewers, "the content of a popular Wikipedia page is actually the most reliable form of information ever created". In September 2022, The Sydney Morning Herald journalist Liam Mannix noted that: "There's no reason to expect Wikipedia to be accurate ... And yet it [is]." Mannix further discussed the multiple studies that have proved Wikipedia to be generally as reliable as Encyclopædia Britannica, summarizing that "...turning our back on such an extraordinary resource is... well, a little petty."

Critics argue that Wikipedia's open nature and a lack of proper sources for most of the information makes it unreliable. Some commentators suggest that Wikipedia may be reliable, but that the reliability of any given article is not clear. Editors of traditional reference works such as the Encyclopædia Britannica have questioned the project's utility and status as an encyclopedia. Wikipedia co-founder Jimmy Wales has claimed that Wikipedia has largely avoided the problem of "fake news" because the Wikipedia community regularly debates the quality of sources in articles.

External videos
- Inside Wikipedia – Attack of the PR Industry, Deutsche Welle, 7:13 mins

Wikipedia's open structure inherently makes it an easy target for Internet trolls, spammers, and various forms of paid advocacy seen as counterproductive to the maintenance of a neutral and verifiable online encyclopedia. In response to paid advocacy editing and undisclosed editing issues, Wikipedia was reported in an article in The Wall Street Journal to have strengthened its rules and laws against undisclosed editing. The article stated that: "Beginning Monday [from the date of the article, June 16, 2014], changes in Wikipedia's terms of use will require anyone paid to edit articles to disclose that arrangement. Katherine Maher, the nonprofit Wikimedia Foundation's chief communications officer, said the changes address a sentiment among volunteer editors that 'we're not an advertising service; we're an encyclopedia.'" These issues, among others, had been parodied since the first decade of Wikipedia, notably by Stephen Colbert on The Colbert Report.

=== Discouragement in education ===
Some university lecturers discourage students from citing any encyclopedia in academic work, preferring primary sources; some specifically prohibit Wikipedia citations. Wales stresses that encyclopedias of any type are not usually appropriate to use as citable sources, and should not be relied upon as authoritative. Wales once (2006 or earlier) said he receives about ten emails weekly from students saying they got failing grades on papers because they cited Wikipedia; he told the students they got what they deserved. "For God's sake, you're in college; don't cite the encyclopedia", he said.

In February 2007, an article in The Harvard Crimson newspaper reported that a few of the professors at Harvard University were including Wikipedia articles in their syllabi, although without realizing the articles might change. In June 2007, Michael Gorman, former president of the American Library Association, condemned Wikipedia, along with Google, stating that academics who endorse the use of Wikipedia are "the intellectual equivalent of a dietitian who recommends a steady diet of Big Macs with everything".

A 2020 research study published in Studies in Higher Education argued that Wikipedia could be applied in the higher education "flipped classroom", an educational model in which students learn before coming to class and apply it in classroom activities. The experimental group was instructed to learn before class and get immediate feedback before going in (the flipped classroom model), while the control group was given direct instructions in class (the conventional classroom model). The groups were then instructed to collaboratively develop Wikipedia entries, which would be graded in quality after the study. The results showed that the experimental group yielded more Wikipedia entries and received higher grades in quality. The study concluded that learning with Wikipedia in flipped classrooms was more effective than in conventional classrooms, demonstrating that Wikipedia could be used as an educational tool in higher education.

==== Medical information ====
On March 5, 2014, Julie Beck, writing for The Atlantic magazine in an article titled "Doctors' #1 Source for Healthcare Information: Wikipedia", stated that "Fifty percent of physicians look up conditions on the (Wikipedia) site, and some are editing articles themselves to improve the quality of available information." Beck continued to detail in this article new programs of Amin Azzam at the University of San Francisco to offer medical school courses to medical students for learning to edit and improve Wikipedia articles on health-related issues, as well as internal quality control programs within Wikipedia organized by James Heilman to improve a group of 200 health-related articles of central medical importance up to Wikipedia's highest standard of articles using its Featured Article and Good Article peer-review evaluation process. In a May 7, 2014, follow-up article in The Atlantic titled "Can Wikipedia Ever Be a Definitive Medical Text?", Julie Beck quotes WikiProject Medicine's James Heilman as stating: "Just because a reference is peer-reviewed doesn't mean it's a high-quality reference." Beck added that: "Wikipedia has its own peer review process before articles can be classified as 'good' or 'featured'. Heilman, who has participated in that process before, says 'less than one percent' of Wikipedia's medical articles have passed."

=== Coverage of topics and systemic bias ===
Wikipedia seeks to create a summary of all human knowledge in the form of an online encyclopedia, with each topic covered encyclopedically in one article. Since it has terabytes of disk space, it can have far more topics than can be covered by any printed encyclopedia. The exact degree and manner of coverage on Wikipedia is under constant review by its editors, and disagreements are not uncommon (see deletionism and inclusionism). Wikipedia contains materials that some people may find objectionable, offensive, or pornographic. The "Wikipedia is not censored" policy has sometimes proved controversial: in 2008, Wikipedia rejected an online petition against the inclusion of images of Muhammad in the English edition of its Muhammad article, citing this policy. The presence of pornography, along with politically and religiously sensitive materials on Wikipedia has led to its censorship by national authorities in China and Pakistan, among other countries.

Through its "Wikipedia Loves Libraries" program, Wikipedia has partnered with major public libraries such as the New York Public Library for the Performing Arts to expand its coverage of underrepresented subjects and articles. A 2011 study conducted by researchers at the University of Minnesota indicated that male and female editors focus on different coverage topics. There was a greater concentration of females in the "people and arts" category, while males focus more on "geography and science". An editorial in The Guardian in 2014 claimed that more effort went into providing references for a list of female porn actors than a list of women writers.

==== Systemic biases ====
Wikipedia's policies may limit "its capacity for truly representing global knowledge". For example, Wikipedia only considers published sources to be reliable. Oral knowledge of Indigenous cultures is not always reflected in print. Marginalized topics are also more likely to lack significant coverage in reliable sources. Wikipedia's content is therefore limited as a result of larger systemic biases.

Academic studies of Wikipedia have shown that the average contributor to the English Wikipedia is an educated, technically inclined white male, aged 15–49, from a developed, predominantly Christian country. The corresponding point of view (POV) is over-represented. This systemic bias in editor demographic results in cultural bias, gender bias, and geographical bias on Wikipedia. There are two broad types of bias, which are implicit (when a topic is omitted) and explicit (when a certain POV is over-represented in an article or by references).

Interdisciplinary scholarly assessments of Wikipedia articles have found that while articles are typically accurate and free of misinformation, they are also typically incomplete and fail to present all perspectives with a neutral point of view. In 2011, Wales claimed that the unevenness of coverage is a reflection of the demography of the editors, citing for example "biographies of famous women through history and issues surrounding early childcare". The October 22, 2013, essay by Tom Simonite in MIT's Technology Review titled "The Decline of Wikipedia" discussed the effect of systemic bias and policy creep on the downward trend in the number of editors.

Research conducted by Mark Graham of the Oxford Internet Institute in 2009 indicated that the geographic distribution of article topics is highly uneven, with Africa being the most underrepresented. Across 30 language editions of Wikipedia, historical articles and sections are generally Eurocentric and focused on recent events.

=== Explicit content ===
Wikipedia has been criticized for allowing information about graphic content. Articles depicting what some critics have called objectionable content (such as feces, cadaver, human penis, vulva, and nudity) contain graphic pictures and detailed information easily available to anyone with access to the internet, including children. The site also includes sexual content such as images and videos of masturbation and ejaculation, illustrations of zoophilia, and photos from hardcore pornographic films in its articles. It also has non-sexual photographs of nude children.

The Wikipedia article about Virgin Killer—a 1976 album from the German rock band Scorpions—features a picture of the album's original cover, which depicts a naked prepubescent girl. The original release cover caused controversy and was replaced in some countries. In December 2008, access to the Wikipedia article Virgin Killer was blocked for four days by most Internet service providers in the United Kingdom after the Internet Watch Foundation (IWF) decided the album cover was a potentially illegal indecent image and added the article's URL to a "blacklist" it supplies to British internet service providers.

In April 2010, Sanger wrote a letter to the Federal Bureau of Investigation, outlining his concerns that two categories of images on Wikimedia Commons contained child pornography, and were in violation of US federal obscenity law. Sanger later clarified that the images, which were related to pedophilia and one about lolicon, were not of real children, but said that they constituted "obscene visual representations of the sexual abuse of children", under the PROTECT Act of 2003. That law bans photographic child pornography and cartoon images and drawings of children that are obscene under American law. Sanger also expressed concerns about access to the images on Wikipedia in schools.

Wikimedia Foundation spokesman Jay Walsh strongly rejected Sanger's accusation, saying that Wikipedia did not have "material we would deem to be illegal. If we did, we would remove it." Following the complaint by Sanger, Wales deleted sexual images without consulting the community. After volunteer editors argued that the decision was made hastily, Wales voluntarily gave up some powers he had held up as part of his co-founder status. He wrote in a message to the Wikimedia Foundation mailing-list that this action was "in the interest of encouraging this discussion to be about real philosophical/content issues, rather than be about me and how quickly I acted". Critics, including Wikipediocracy, noticed that many of the pornographic images deleted from Wikipedia since 2010 have reappeared.

=== Privacy ===
One privacy concern in the case of Wikipedia regards one's right to remain a private citizen rather than a public figure in the eyes of the law. (Note: See "Libel" by David McHam for the legal distinction.) It is a battle between the right to be anonymous in cyberspace and the right to be anonymous in real life. The Wikimedia Foundation's privacy policy states, "we believe that you shouldn't have to provide personal information to participate in the free knowledge movement", and states that "personal information" may be shared "For legal reasons", "To Protect You, Ourselves & Others", or "To Understand & Experiment".

In January 2006, a German court ordered the German Wikipedia shut down within Germany because it stated the full name of Boris Floricic, aka "Tron", a deceased hacker. On February 9, 2006, the injunction against Wikimedia Deutschland was overturned, with the court rejecting the notion that Tron's right to privacy or that of his parents was being violated.

Wikipedia has a "Volunteer Response Team" that uses Znuny, a free and open-source software fork of OTRS to handle queries without having to reveal the identities of the involved parties. This is used, for example, in confirming the permission for using individual images and other media in the project.

In late April 2023, the Wikimedia Foundation announced that Wikipedia will not submit to any age verifications that may be required by the UK's Online Safety Bill legislation. Rebecca MacKinnon of the Wikimedia Foundation said that such checks would run counter to the website's commitment to minimal data collection on its contributors and readers.

=== Sexism ===
Wikipedia was described in 2015 as harboring a battleground culture of sexism and harassment. The perceived tolerance of abusive language was a reason put forth in 2013 for the gender gap in Wikipedia editorship. Edit-a-thons have been held to encourage female editors and increase the coverage of women's topics.

In May 2018, a Wikipedia editor rejected a submitted article about Donna Strickland due to lack of coverage in the media. Five months later, Strickland won a Nobel Prize in Physics "for groundbreaking inventions in the field of laser physics", becoming the third woman to ever receive the award. Prior to winning the award, Strickland's only mention on Wikipedia was in the article about her collaborator and co-winner of the award Gérard Mourou. Her exclusion from Wikipedia led to accusations of sexism, but Corinne Purtill writing for Quartz argued that "it's also a pointed lesson in the hazards of gender bias in media, and of the broader consequences of underrepresentation." Purtill attributes the issue to the gender bias in media coverage.

A comprehensive 2008 survey, published in 2016, by Julia B. Bear of Stony Brook University's College of Business and Benjamin Collier of Carnegie Mellon University found significant gender differences in confidence in expertise, discomfort with editing, and response to critical feedback. "Women reported less confidence in their expertise, expressed greater discomfort with editing (which typically involves conflict), and reported more negative responses to critical feedback compared to men."

=== Nine Theses ===
"Nine Theses" refers to a reform proposal published by Larry Sanger in October 2025. Sanger's Nine Theses on Wikipedia presents a critical assessment and reform agenda for Wikipedia. The proposal is part of his broader effort to address what Sanger perceives as systemic issues within Wikipedia, which include, ideological bias, lack of transparency in the editor hierarchies, and an ineffective consensus-based decision-making procedure.

== Operation ==
=== Wikimedia Foundation and affiliate movements ===
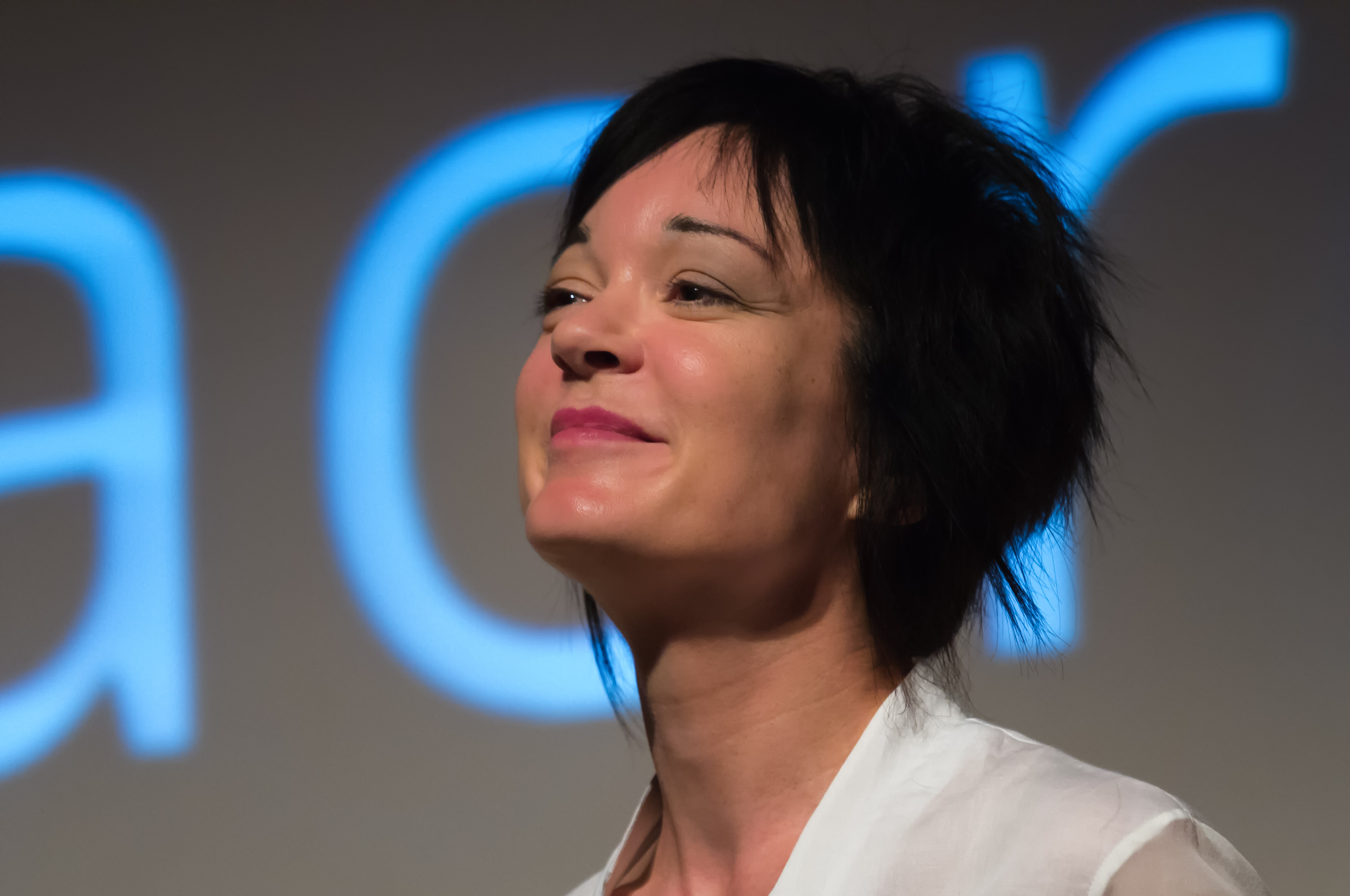
Sue Gardner, first executive director, in 2013 at Wikimania

Wikipedia is hosted and funded by the Wikimedia Foundation, a non-profit organization which also operates Wikipedia-related projects such as Wiktionary and Wikibooks. The foundation relies on public contributions and grants to fund its mission. The foundation's 2020 Internal Revenue Service Form 990 shows revenue of $124.6 million and expenses of almost $112.2 million, with assets of about $191.2 million and liabilities of almost $11 million.

In May 2014, Wikimedia Foundation named Lila Tretikov as its second executive director, taking over for Sue Gardner. The Wall Street Journal reported on May 1, 2014, that Tretikov's information technology background, from her years at University of California offers Wikipedia an opportunity to develop in more concentrated directions guided by her often repeated position statement that, "Information, like air, wants to be free." The same Wall Street Journal article reported these directions of development according to an interview with spokesman Jay Walsh of Wikimedia, who "said Tretikov would address that issue (paid advocacy) as a priority. 'We are really pushing toward more transparency ... We are reinforcing that paid advocacy is not welcome.' Initiatives to involve greater diversity of contributors, better mobile support of Wikipedia, new geo-location tools to find local content more easily, and more tools for users in the second and third world are also priorities", Walsh said.

Following the departure of Tretikov from Wikipedia due to issues concerning the use of the "superprotection" feature which some language versions of Wikipedia have adopted, Katherine Maher became the third executive director of the Wikimedia Foundation in June 2016. Maher stated that one of her priorities would be the issue of editor harassment endemic to Wikipedia as identified by the Wikipedia board in December. She said to Bloomberg Businessweek regarding the harassment issue that: "It establishes a sense within the community that this is a priority ... [and that correction requires that] it has to be more than words."

Maher served as executive director until April 2021. Maryana Iskander was named the incoming CEO in September 2021, and took over that role in January 2022. She stated that one of her focuses would be increasing diversity in the Wikimedia community. Iskander served until January 2026, when Bernadette Meehan took over as CEO.

Wikipedia is also supported by many organizations and groups that are affiliated with the Wikimedia Foundation but independently run, called Wikimedia movement affiliates. These include Wikimedia chapters (which are national or sub-national organizations, such as Wikimedia Deutschland and Wikimedia France), thematic organizations (such as Amical Wikimedia for the Catalan language community), and user groups. These affiliates participate in the promotion, development, and funding of Wikipedia.

=== Software operations and support ===
The operation of Wikipedia depends on MediaWiki, a custom-made, free and open source wiki software platform written in PHP and built upon the MySQL database system. The software incorporates programming features such as a macro language, variables, a transclusion system for templates, and URL redirection. MediaWiki is licensed under the GNU General Public License (GPL) and it is used by all Wikimedia projects, as well as many other wiki projects. Originally, Wikipedia ran on UseModWiki written in Perl by Clifford Adams (Phase I), which initially required CamelCase for article hyperlinks; the present double bracket style was incorporated later. Starting in January 2002 (Phase II), Wikipedia began running on a PHP wiki engine with a MySQL database; this software was custom-made for Wikipedia by Magnus Manske. The Phase II software was repeatedly modified to accommodate the exponentially increasing demand. In July 2002 (Phase III), Wikipedia shifted to the third-generation software, MediaWiki, originally written by Lee Daniel Crocker.

Several MediaWiki extensions are installed to extend the functionality of the MediaWiki software. In April 2005, a Lucene extension was added to MediaWiki's built-in search and Wikipedia switched from MySQL to Lucene for searching. Lucene was later replaced by CirrusSearch which is based on Elasticsearch. In July 2013, after extensive beta testing, a WYSIWYG (What You See Is What You Get) extension, VisualEditor, was opened to public use. It was met with much rejection and criticism, and was described as "slow and buggy". The feature was changed from opt-out to opt-in afterward.

=== Automated editing ===
Computer programs called bots have often been used to perform simple and repetitive tasks, such as correcting common misspellings and stylistic issues, or to start articles such as geography entries in a standard format from statistical data. One controversial contributor, Sverker Johansson, created articles with his bot Lsjbot, which was reported to create up to 10,000 articles on the Swedish Wikipedia on certain days. Additionally, there are bots designed to automatically notify editors when they make common editing errors (such as unmatched quotes or unmatched parentheses). Edits falsely identified by bots as the work of a banned editor can be restored by other editors. An anti-vandal bot is programmed to detect and revert vandalism quickly. Bots are able to indicate edits from particular accounts or IP address ranges, as occurred at the time of the shooting down of the MH17 jet in July 2014 when it was reported that edits were made via IPs controlled by the Russian government. Bots on Wikipedia must be approved before activation. According to Andrew Lih, the current expansion of Wikipedia to millions of articles would be difficult to envision without the use of such bots.

In March 2026, an AI agent, Tom, edited Wikipedia under the account TomWikiAssist. The account was blocked for being an unapproved bot.

=== Hardware operations and support ===
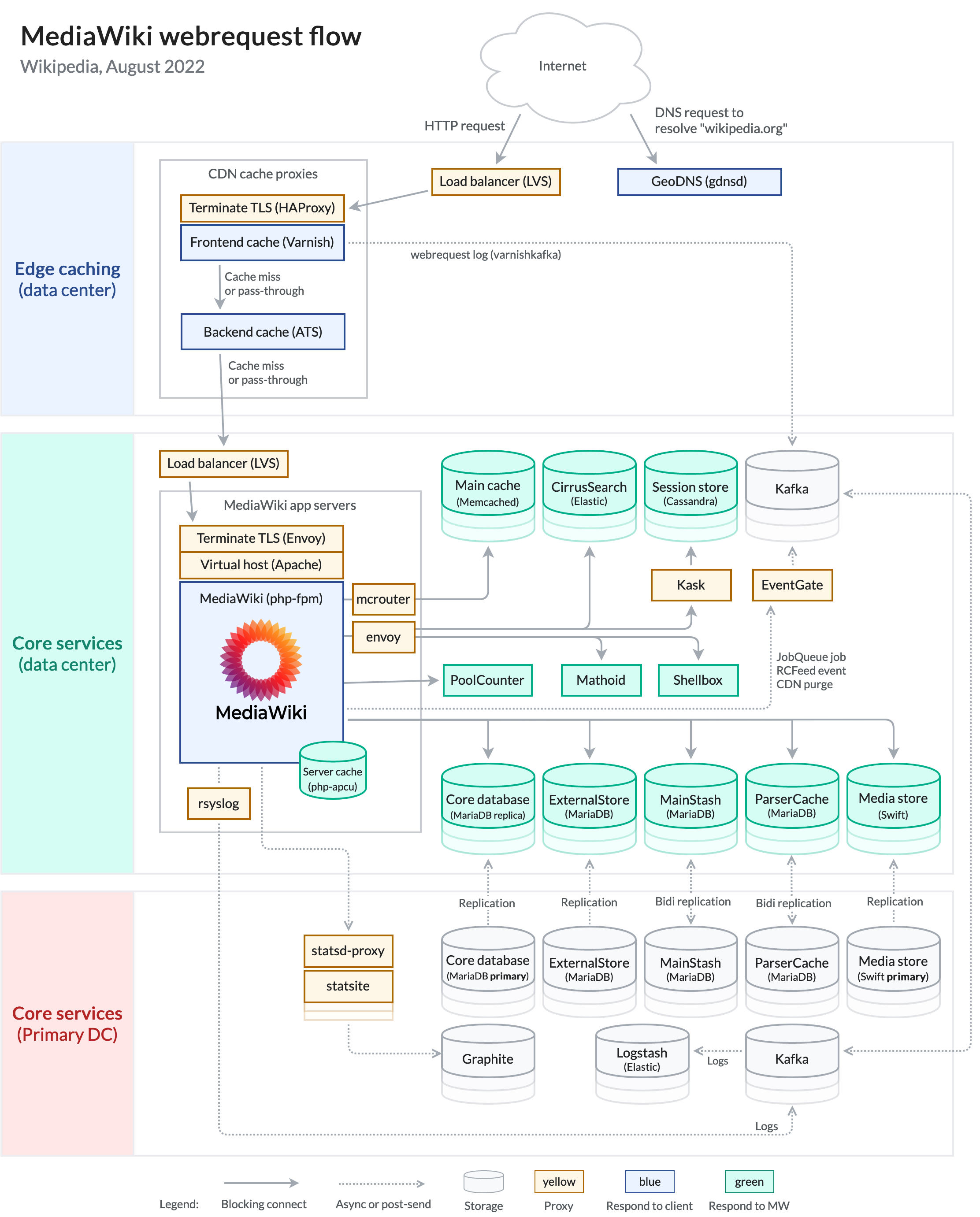
Overview of system architecture as of August 2022

As of 2021, page requests are first passed to a front-end layer of Varnish caching servers and back-end layer caching is done by Apache Traffic Server. Requests that cannot be served from the Varnish cache are sent to load-balancing servers running the Linux Virtual Server software, which in turn pass them to one of the Apache web servers for page rendering from the database. The web servers deliver pages as requested, performing page rendering for all the language editions of Wikipedia. To increase speed further, rendered pages are cached in a distributed memory cache until invalidated, allowing page rendering to be skipped entirely for the most common page accesses.

Wikipedia currently runs on dedicated clusters of Linux servers running the Debian operating system. By January 22, 2013, Wikipedia had migrated its primary data center to an Equinix facility in Ashburn, Virginia. A second application data center was created in 2014 in Carrollton, Texas, to improve Wikipedia's reliability. Both datacenters work as the primary one, in alternate semesters, with the other one working as secondary datacenter. In 2017, Wikipedia installed a caching cluster in an Equinix facility in Singapore, the first of its kind in Asia. In 2022, a caching data center was opened in Marseille, France. In 2024, a caching data center was opened in São Paulo, the first of its kind in South America. As of November 2024, caching clusters are located in Amsterdam, San Francisco, Singapore, Marseille, and São Paulo.

=== Internal research and operational development ===
Following growing amounts of incoming donations in 2013 exceeding seven digits, the Foundation has reached a threshold of assets which qualify its consideration under the principles of industrial organization economics to indicate the need for the re-investment of donations into the internal research and development of the Foundation. Two projects of such internal research and development have been the creation of a Visual Editor and the "Thank" tab in the edit history, which were developed to improve issues of editor attrition. The estimates for reinvestment by industrial organizations into internal research and development was studied by Adam Jaffe, who recorded that the range of 4% to 25% annually was to be recommended, with high-end technology requiring the higher level of support for internal reinvestment. At the 2013 level of contributions for Wikimedia presently documented as 45 million dollars, the computed budget level recommended by Jaffe for reinvestment into internal research and development is between 1.8 million and 11.3 million dollars annually. In 2019, the level of contributions were reported by the Wikimedia Foundation as being at $120 million annually, updating the Jaffe estimates for the higher level of support to between $3.08 million and $19.2 million annually.

=== Internal news publications ===
Multiple Wikimedia projects have internal news publications. Wikimedia's online newspaper The Signpost was founded in 2005 by Michael Snow, a Wikipedia administrator who would join the Wikimedia Foundation's board of trustees in 2008. The publication covers news and events from the English Wikipedia, the Wikimedia Foundation, and Wikipedia's sister projects.

=== The Wikipedia Library ===
Logo of the Wikipedia Library

Wikipedia editors sometimes struggle to access paywalled sources needed to improve a subject. The Wikipedia Library is a resource for Wikipedia editors which provides free access to a wide range of digital publications, so that they can consult and cite these while editing the encyclopedia. Founded in 2010 when Credo Reference donated 500 free accounts, it was soon followed by over 4,500 accounts donated by HighBeam Research (defunct 2018), Questia Online Library (defunct 2020), JSTOR, and Cochrane Library. In 2013, the Wikimedia Foundation began funding the program through grants. Since then, over 60 publishers have partnered with the Wikipedia Library to provide access to their resources: when ICE Publishing joined in 2020, a spokesman said "By enabling free access to our content for Wikipedia editors, we hope to further the research community's resources – creating and updating Wikipedia entries on civil engineering which are read by thousands of monthly readers."

== Access to content ==
=== Content licensing ===
When the project was started in 2001, all text in Wikipedia was covered by the GNU Free Documentation License (GFDL), a copyleft license permitting the redistribution, creation of derivative works, and commercial use of content while authors retain copyright of their work. The GFDL was created for software manuals that come with free software programs licensed under the GPL. This made it a poor choice for a general reference work: for example, the GFDL requires the reprints of materials from Wikipedia to come with a full copy of the GFDL text. In December 2002, the Creative Commons license was released; it was specifically designed for creative works in general, not just for software manuals. The Wikipedia project sought the switch to the Creative Commons. Because the GFDL and Creative Commons were incompatible, in November 2008, following the request of the project, the Free Software Foundation (FSF) released a new version of the GFDL designed specifically to allow Wikipedia to relicense its content to CC BY-SA by August 1, 2009. In April 2009, Wikipedia and its sister projects held a community-wide referendum, which decided the switch in June 2009.

The handling of media files (e.g., image files) varies across language editions. Some language editions, such as the English Wikipedia, include non-free image files under fair use doctrine, while the others have opted not to, in part because of the lack of fair use doctrines in their home countries (e.g. in Japanese copyright law). Media files covered by free content licenses (e.g. Creative Commons' CC BY-SA) are shared across language editions via Wikimedia Commons repository, a project operated by the Wikimedia Foundation. Wikipedia's accommodation of varying international copyright laws regarding images has led some to observe that its photographic coverage of topics lags behind the quality of the encyclopedic text. The Wikimedia Foundation is not a licensor of content on Wikipedia or its related projects but merely a hosting service for contributors to and licensors of Wikipedia, a position which was successfully defended in 2004 in a court in France.

=== Methods of access ===
Since Wikipedia content is distributed under an open license, anyone can reuse or redistribute it at no charge. The content of Wikipedia has been published in many forms, both online and offline, outside the Wikipedia website.

Thousands of "mirror sites" exist that republish content from Wikipedia; two prominent ones that also include content from other reference sources are Reference.com and Answers.com. Another example is Wapedia, which began to display Wikipedia content in a mobile-device-friendly format before Wikipedia itself did. Some web search engines make special use of Wikipedia content when displaying search results: examples include Microsoft Bing (via technology gained from Powerset) and DuckDuckGo.

Collections of Wikipedia articles have been published on optical discs. An English version released in 2006 contained about 2,000 articles. The Polish-language version from 2006 contains nearly 240,000 articles, the German-language version from 2007/2008 contains over 620,000 articles, and the Spanish-language version from 2011 contains 886,000 articles. Additionally, "Wikipedia for Schools", the Wikipedia series of CDs / DVDs produced by Wikipedia and SOS Children, is a free selection from Wikipedia designed for education towards children aged eight to seventeen.

There have been efforts to put a select subset of Wikipedia's articles into printed book form. Since 2009, tens of thousands of print-on-demand books that reproduced English, German, Russian, and French Wikipedia articles have been produced by the American company Books LLC and by three Mauritian subsidiaries of the German publisher VDM.

The website DBpedia, begun in 2007, extracts data from the infoboxes and category declarations of the English-language Wikipedia. Wikimedia has created the Wikidata project with a similar objective of storing the basic facts from each page of Wikipedia and other Wikimedia Foundation projects and make it available in a queryable semantic format, RDF. As of February 2023, it has over 101 million items. WikiReader is a dedicated reader device that contains an offline copy of Wikipedia, which was launched by OpenMoko and first released in 2009.

Obtaining the full contents of Wikipedia for reuse presents challenges, since direct cloning via a web crawler is discouraged. Wikipedia publishes "dumps" of its contents, but these are text-only; as of 2023, there is no dump available of Wikipedia's images. Wikimedia Enterprise is a for-profit solution to this.

Several languages of Wikipedia also maintain a reference desk, where volunteers answer questions from the general public. According to a study by Pnina Shachaf in the Journal of Documentation, the quality of the Wikipedia reference desk is comparable to a standard library reference desk, with an accuracy of 55 percent.

==== Mobile access ====
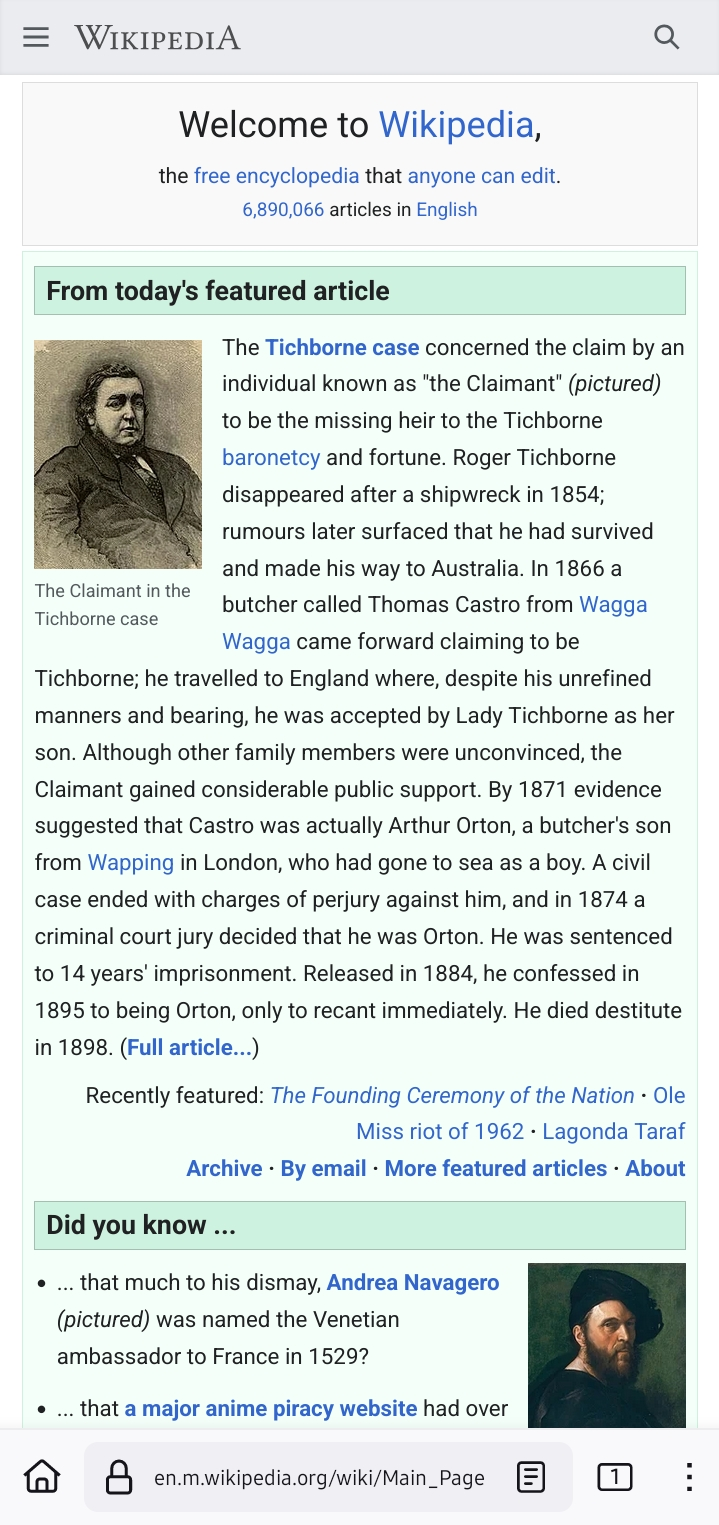
A mobile version showing the English Wikipedia's Main Page on October 2, 2024

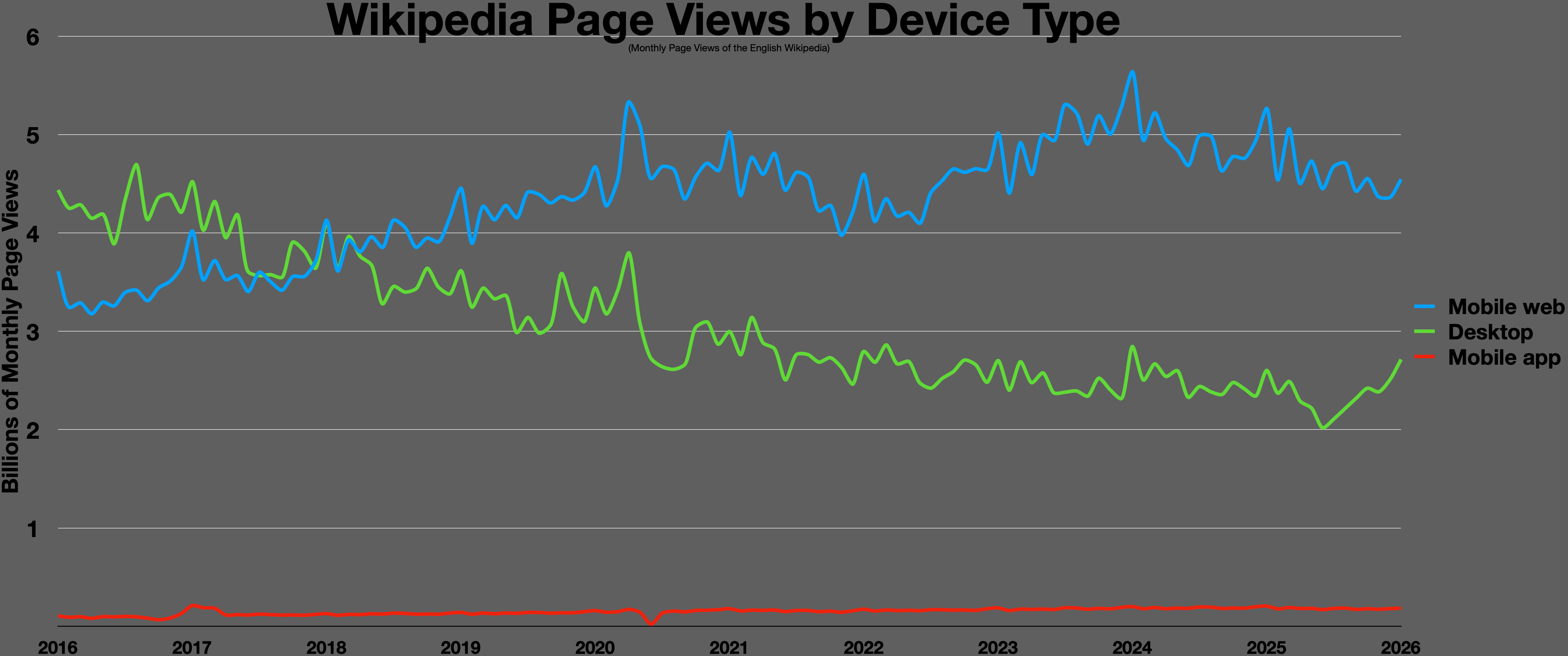
Wikipedia page views by platform

Wikipedia's original medium was for users to read and edit content using any standard web browser through a fixed Internet connection. Although Wikipedia content has been accessible through the mobile web since July 2013, The New York Times on February 9, 2014, quoted Erik Möller, deputy director of the Wikimedia Foundation, stating that the transition of internet traffic from desktops to mobile devices was significant and a cause for concern and worry. The article in The New York Times reported the comparison statistics for mobile edits stating that, "Only 20 percent of the readership of the English-language Wikipedia comes via mobile devices, a figure substantially lower than the percentage of mobile traffic for other media sites, many of which approach 50 percent. And the shift to mobile editing has lagged even more." In 2014 The New York Times reported that Möller has assigned "a team of 10 software developers focused on mobile", out of a total of approximately 200 employees working at the Wikimedia Foundation. One principal concern cited by The New York Times for the "worry" is for Wikipedia to effectively address attrition issues with the number of editors which the online encyclopedia attracts to edit and maintain its content in a mobile access environment. By 2023, the Wikimedia Foundation's staff had grown to over 700 employees.

Access to Wikipedia from mobile phones was possible as early as 2004, through the Wireless Application Protocol (WAP), via the Wapedia service. In June 2007, Wikipedia launched en.mobile.wikipedia.org, an official website for wireless devices. In 2009, a newer mobile service was officially released, located at en.m.wikipedia.org, which caters to more advanced mobile devices such as the iPhone, Android-based devices, or WebOS-based devices. Several other methods of mobile access to Wikipedia have emerged since. Many devices and applications optimize or enhance the display of Wikipedia content for mobile devices, while some also incorporate additional features such as use of Wikipedia metadata like geoinformation.

The Android app for Wikipedia was released in January 2012, to over 500,000 installs and generally positive reviews, scoring over four of a possible five in a poll of approximately 200,000 users downloading from Google. The version for iOS was released on April 3, 2013, to similar reviews. Wikipedia Zero was an initiative of the Wikimedia Foundation to expand the reach of the encyclopedia to the developing countries by partnering with mobile operators to allow free access. It was discontinued in February 2018 due to lack of participation from mobile operators.

Andrew Lih and Andrew Brown both maintain that editing Wikipedia with smartphones is difficult, and this discourages new potential contributors. Lih states that the number of Wikipedia editors has been declining after several years, and Tom Simonite of MIT Technology Review claims the bureaucratic structure and rules are a factor in this. Simonite alleges some Wikipedians use the labyrinthine rules and guidelines to dominate others and those editors have a vested interest in keeping the status quo. Lih alleges there is a serious disagreement among existing contributors on how to resolve this. Lih fears for Wikipedia's long-term future while Brown fears problems with Wikipedia will remain, and rival encyclopedias will not replace it.

=== Chinese access ===
Access to Wikipedia has been blocked in mainland China since May 2015. This was done after Wikipedia started to use HTTPS encryption, which made selective censorship more difficult.

== Cultural influence ==
=== Trusted source to combat fake news ===
In 2017–18, after a barrage of false news reports, both Facebook and YouTube announced they would rely on Wikipedia to help their users evaluate reports and reject false news. Noam Cohen, writing in The Washington Post states, "YouTube's reliance on Wikipedia to set the record straight builds on the thinking of another fact-challenged platform, the Facebook social network, which announced last year that Wikipedia would help its users root out 'fake news'."

=== Readership ===
In February 2014, The New York Times reported that Wikipedia was ranked fifth globally among all websites, stating "With 18 billion page views and nearly 500 million unique visitors a month, ... Wikipedia trails just Yahoo, Facebook, Microsoft, and Google, the largest with 1.2 billion unique visitors." However, its ranking dropped to 13th globally by June 2020 due mostly to a rise in popularity of Chinese websites for online shopping. The website has since recovered its ranking as of April 2022.

In addition to logistic growth in the number of its articles, Wikipedia has steadily gained status as a general reference website since its inception in 2001. The number of readers of Wikipedia worldwide reached 365 million at the end of 2009. The Pew Internet and American Life project found that one third of US Internet users consulted Wikipedia. In 2011, Business Insider gave Wikipedia a valuation of $4 billion if it ran advertisements.

According to "Wikipedia Readership Survey 2011", the average age of Wikipedia readers is 36, with a rough parity between genders. Almost half of Wikipedia readers visit the site more than five times a month, and a similar number of readers specifically look for Wikipedia in search engine results. About 47 percent of Wikipedia readers do not realize that Wikipedia is a non-profit organization. As of February 2023, Wikipedia attracts around 2 billion unique devices monthly, with the English Wikipedia receiving 10 billion pageviews each month.

==== COVID-19 pandemic ====
During the COVID-19 pandemic, Wikipedia's coverage of the pandemic and fight against misinformation received international media attention, and brought an increase in Wikipedia readership overall. Noam Cohen wrote in Wired that Wikipedia's effort to combat misinformation related to the pandemic was different from other major websites, opining, "Unless Twitter, Facebook and the others can learn to address misinformation more effectively, Wikipedia will remain the last best place on the Internet." In October 2020, the World Health Organization announced they were freely licensing its infographics and other materials on Wikimedia projects. There were nearly 7,000 COVID-19 related Wikipedia articles across 188 different Wikipedias, as of November 2021.

=== Cultural significance ===
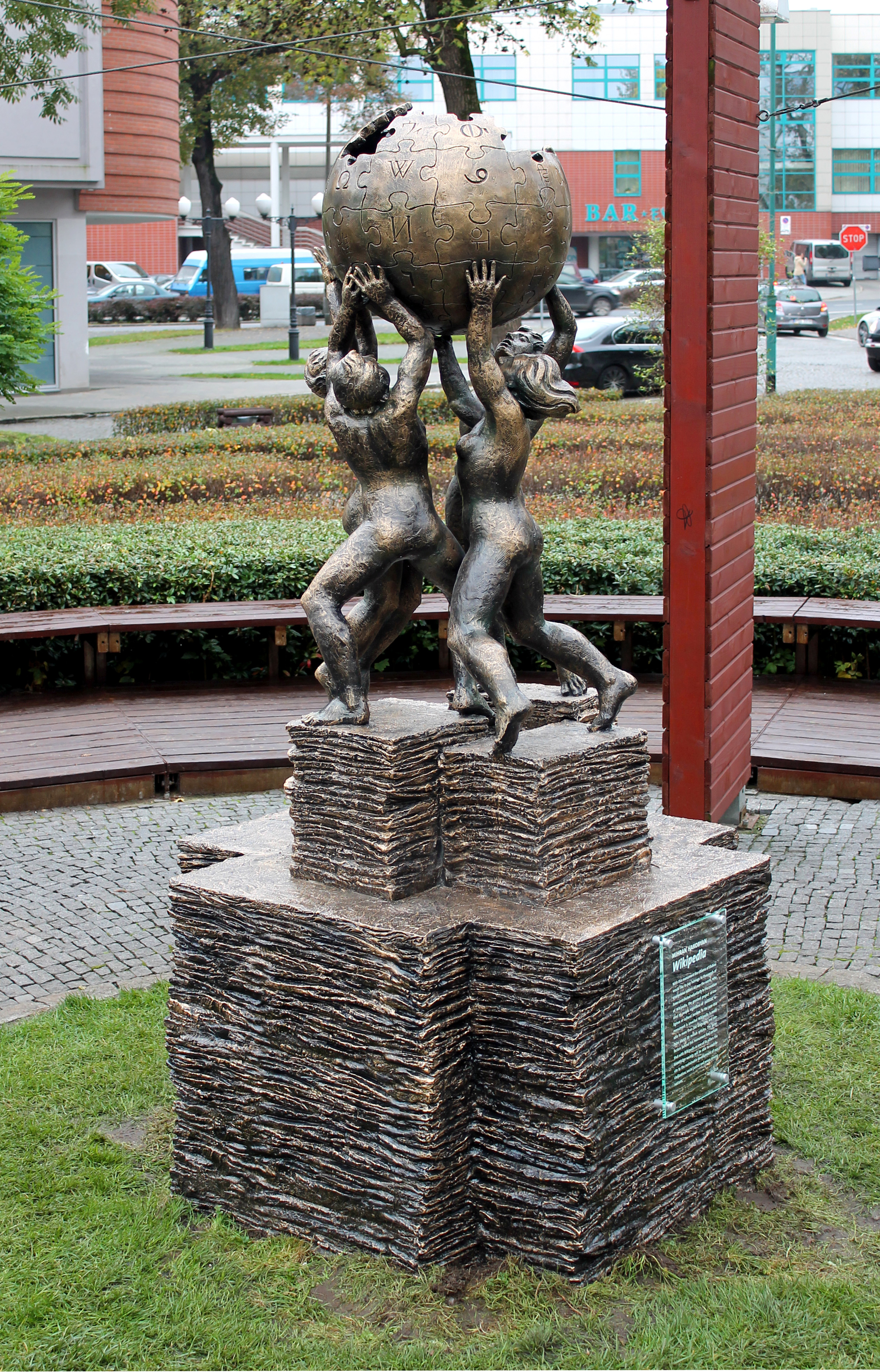
Wikipedia Monument in Słubice, Poland, by Mihran Hakobyan (2014)

Wikipedia's content has also been used in academic studies, books, conferences, and court cases. The Parliament of Canada's website refers to Wikipedia's article on same-sex marriage in the "related links" section of its "further reading" list for the Civil Marriage Act. The encyclopedia's assertions are increasingly used as a source by organizations such as the US federal courts and the World Intellectual Property Organization—though mainly for supporting information rather than information decisive to a case. Content appearing on Wikipedia has also been cited as a source and referenced in some US intelligence agency reports. In December 2008, the scientific journal RNA Biology launched a new section for descriptions of families of RNA molecules and requires authors who contribute to the section to also submit a draft article on the RNA family for publication in Wikipedia. Wikipedia has also been used as a source in journalism, often without attribution, and several reporters have been dismissed for plagiarizing from Wikipedia.

In 2006, Time magazine recognized Wikipedia's participation (along with YouTube, Reddit, MySpace, and Facebook) in the rapid growth of online collaboration and interaction by millions of people worldwide. On September 16, 2007, The Washington Post reported that Wikipedia had become a focal point in the 2008 US election campaign, saying: "Type a candidate's name into Google, and among the first results is a Wikipedia page, making those entries arguably as important as any ad in defining a candidate. Already, the presidential entries are being edited, dissected and debated countless times each day." An October 2007 Reuters article, titled "Wikipedia page the latest status symbol", reported the recent phenomenon of how having a Wikipedia article vindicates one's notability.

One of the first times Wikipedia was involved in a governmental affair was on September 28, 2007, when Italian politician Franco Grillini raised a parliamentary question with the minister of cultural resources and activities about the necessity of freedom of panorama. He said that the lack of such freedom forced Wikipedia, "the seventh most consulted website", to forbid all images of modern Italian buildings and art, and claimed this was hugely damaging to tourist revenues.

Wikipedia, an introduction – Erasmus Prize 2015

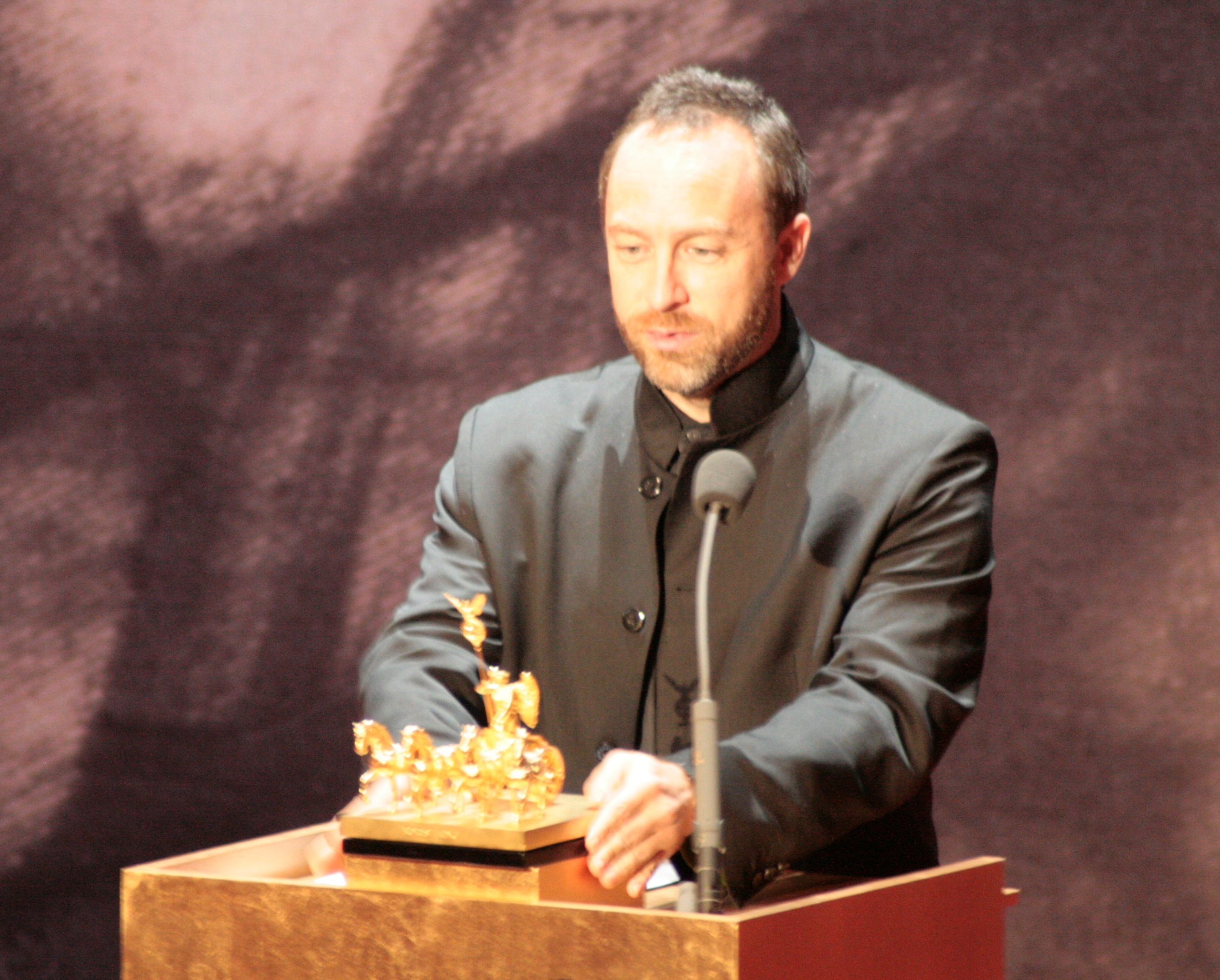
Jimmy Wales accepts the 2008 Quadriga A Mission of Enlightenment award on behalf of Wikipedia.

A working group led by Peter Stone (formed as a part of the Stanford-based project One Hundred Year Study on Artificial Intelligence) in its report called Wikipedia "the best-known example of crowdsourcing ... that far exceeds traditionally-compiled information sources, such as encyclopedias and dictionaries, in scale and depth".

In a 2017 opinion piece for Wired, Hossein Derakhshan describes Wikipedia as "one of the last remaining pillars of the open and decentralized web" and contrasted its existence as a text-based source of knowledge with social media and social networking services, the latter having "since colonized the web for television's values". For Derakhshan, Wikipedia's goal as an encyclopedia represents the Age of Enlightenment tradition of rationality triumphing over emotions, a trend which he considers "endangered" due to the "gradual shift from a typographic culture to a photographic one, which in turn mean[s] a shift from rationality to emotions, exposition to entertainment". Rather than "sapere aude" (lit. 'dare to know'), social networks have led to a culture of "dare not to care to know". This is while Wikipedia faces "a more concerning problem" than funding, namely "a flattening growth rate in the number of contributors to the website". Consequently, the challenge for Wikipedia and those who use it is to "save Wikipedia and its promise of a free and open collection of all human knowledge amid the conquest of new and old television—how to collect and preserve knowledge when nobody cares to know."

==== Awards ====
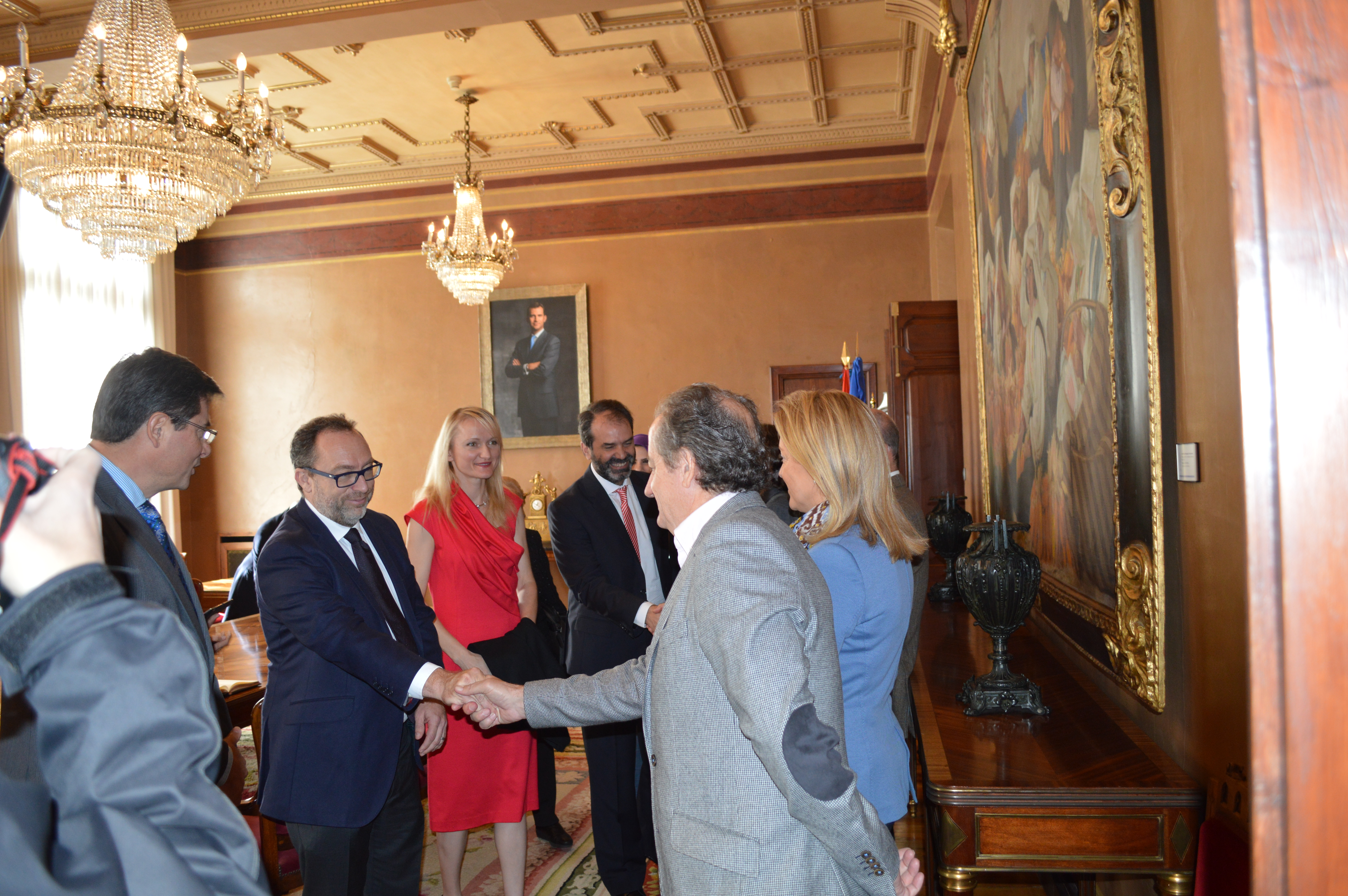
Wikipedia team visiting the Parliament of Asturias

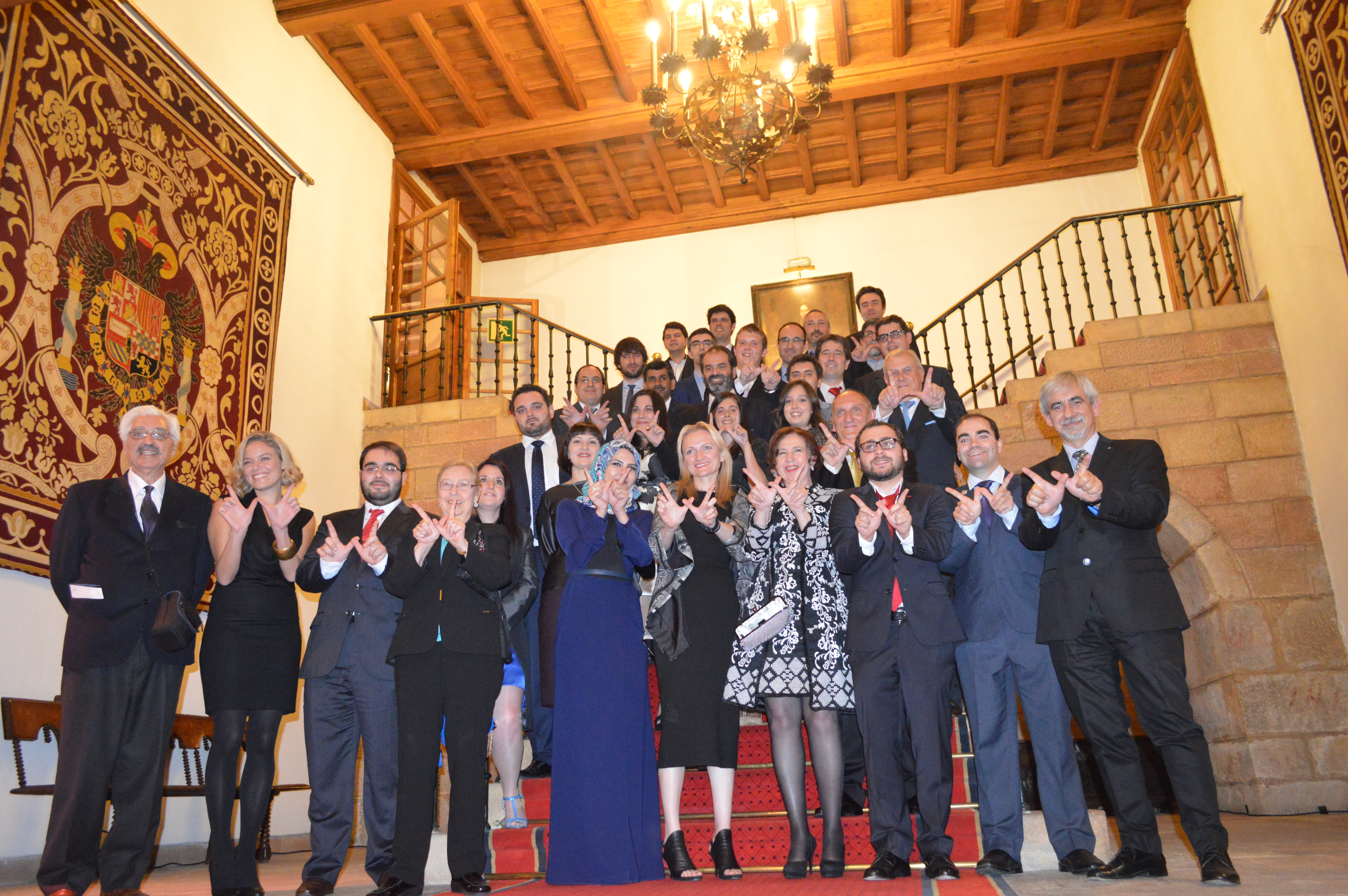
Wikipedians meeting after the 2015 Asturias awards ceremony

Wikipedia has won many awards, receiving its first two major awards in May 2004. The first was a Golden Nica for Digital Communities of the annual Prix Ars Electronica contest; this came with a €10,000 (£6,588; $12,700) grant and an invitation to present at the PAE Cyberarts Festival in Austria later that year. The second was a Judges' Webby Award for the "community" category.

In September 2008, Wikipedia received Quadriga A Mission of Enlightenment award of Werkstatt Deutschland along with Boris Tadić, Eckart Höfling, and Peter Gabriel. The award was presented to Wales by David Weinberger.

In 2015, Wikipedia was awarded both the annual Erasmus Prize, which recognizes exceptional contributions to culture, society or social sciences, and the Spanish Princess of Asturias Award on International Cooperation. Speaking at the Asturian Parliament in Oviedo, the city that hosts the awards ceremony, Jimmy Wales praised the work of the Asturian Wikipedia users.

==== Satire ====
Comedian Stephen Colbert has parodied or referenced Wikipedia on numerous episodes of his show The Colbert Report and coined the related term wikiality, meaning "together we can create a reality that we all agree on—the reality we just agreed on". Another example can be found in "Wikipedia Celebrates 750 Years of American Independence", a July 2006 front-page article in The Onion, as well as the 2010 The Onion article "'L.A. Law' Wikipedia Page Viewed 874 Times Today".

In an April 2007 episode of the American television comedy The Office, office manager (Michael Scott) is shown relying on a hypothetical Wikipedia article for information on negotiation tactics to assist him in negotiating lesser pay for an employee. Viewers of the show tried to add the episode's mention of the page as a section of the actual Wikipedia article on negotiation, but this effort was prevented by other users on the article's talk page.

"My Number One Doctor", a 2007 episode of the television show Scrubs, played on the perception that Wikipedia is an unreliable reference tool with a scene in which Perry Cox reacts to a patient who says that a Wikipedia article indicates that the raw food diet reverses the effects of bone cancer by retorting that the same editor who wrote that article also wrote the Battlestar Galactica episode guide.

In 2008, the comedy website CollegeHumor produced a video sketch named "Professor Wikipedia", in which the fictitious Professor Wikipedia instructs a class with a medley of unverifiable and occasionally absurd statements. The Dilbert comic strip from May 8, 2009, features a character supporting an improbable claim by saying, "Give me ten minutes and then check Wikipedia." In July 2009, BBC Radio 4 broadcast a comedy series called Bigipedia, which was set on a website which was a parody of Wikipedia. Some of the sketches were directly inspired by Wikipedia and its articles.

On August 23, 2013, the New Yorker website published a cartoon with this caption: "Dammit, Manning, have you considered the pronoun war that this is going to start on your Wikipedia page?" The cartoon referred to Chelsea Elizabeth Manning (born Bradley Edward Manning), an American activist, politician, and former United States Army soldier who had recently come out as a trans woman.

In June 2024, Nature published a fictional Wikipedia talk page under the title "Plastic-eating fungus caused doomsday" by Emma Burnett. The talk page concerned a fictional article describing the unintended consequences of the release of a plastic-eating fungus to clean up an oil spill. The article contained talk page topics found on Wikipedia, like discussions of changes in the article's assessment.

=== Publishing ===
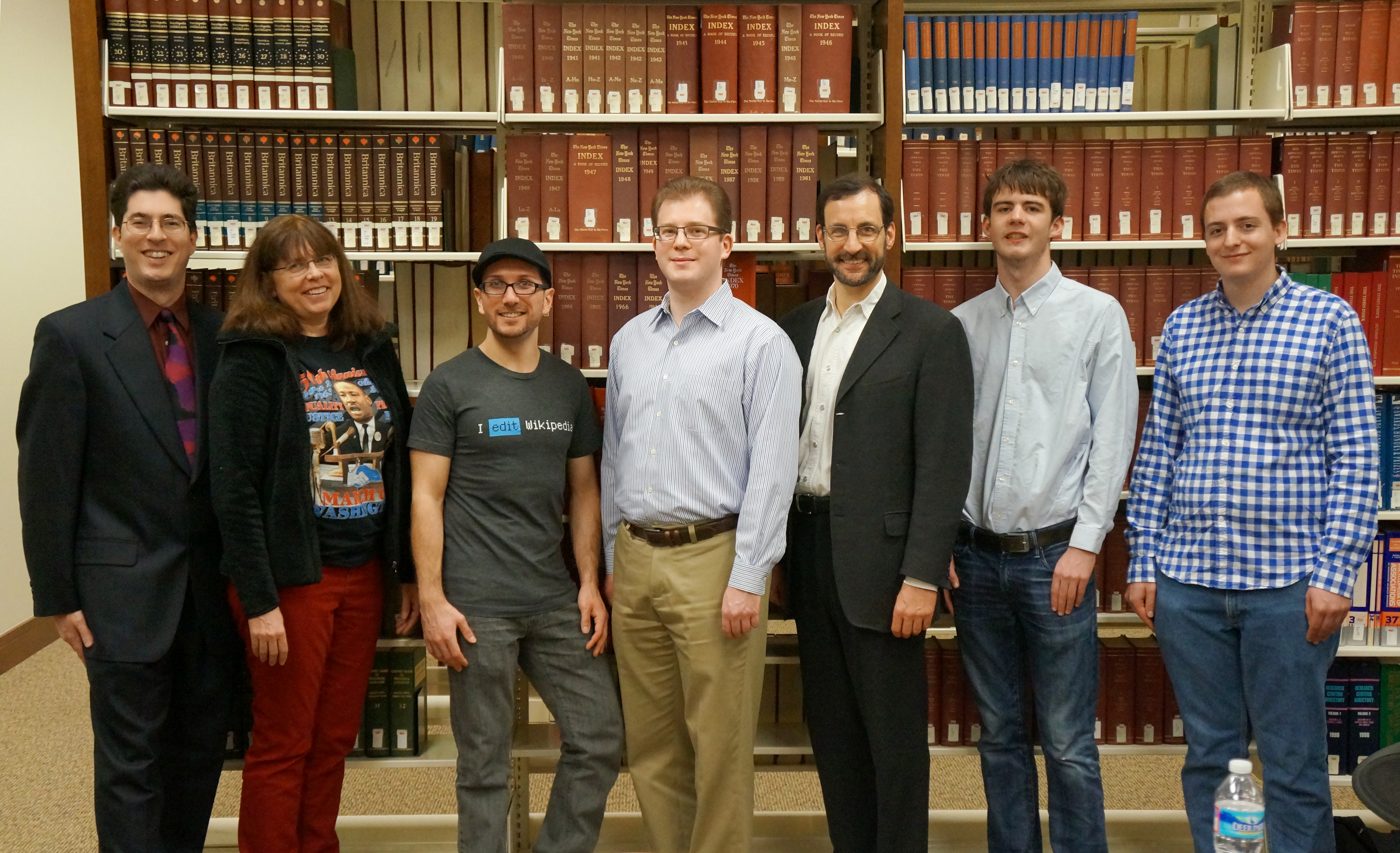
A group of Wikimedians of the Wikimedia DC chapter at the 2013 DC Wikimedia annual meeting standing in front of the Encyclopædia Britannica (back left) at the US National Archives

The most obvious economic effect of Wikipedia has been the death of commercial encyclopedias, especially printed versions like Encyclopædia Britannica, which were unable to compete with a free alternative. Nicholas Carr's 2005 essay "The amorality of Web 2.0" criticizes websites with user-generated content (like Wikipedia) for possibly leading to professional (and, in his view, superior) content producers' going out of business, because "free trumps quality all the time". Carr wrote, "Implicit in the ecstatic visions of Web 2.0 is the hegemony of the amateur. I for one can't imagine anything more frightening." Others dispute the notion that Wikipedia, or similar efforts, will entirely displace traditional publications. Chris Anderson, the former editor-in-chief of Wired, wrote in Nature that the "wisdom of crowds" approach of Wikipedia will not displace top scientific journals with rigorous peer review processes.

Wikipedia's influence on the biography publishing business has been a concern for some. Book publishing data tracker Nielsen BookScan stated in 2013 that biography sales were dropping "far more sharply". Kathryn Hughes, professor of life writing at the University of East Anglia and author of two biographies wrote, "The worry is that, if you can get all that information from Wikipedia, what's left for biography?"

=== Research use ===
Wikipedia has been widely used as a corpus for linguistic research in computational linguistics, information retrieval and natural language processing. In particular, it commonly serves as a target knowledge base for the entity linking problem, which is then called "wikification", and to the related problem of word-sense disambiguation. Methods similar to wikification can in turn be used to find "missing" links in Wikipedia.

In 2015, French researchers José Lages of the University of Franche-Comté in Besançon and Dima Shepelyansky of Paul Sabatier University in Toulouse published a global university ranking based on Wikipedia scholarly citations. They used PageRank, CheiRank and similar algorithms "followed by the number of appearances in the 24 different language editions of Wikipedia (descending order) and the century in which they were founded (ascending order)". The study was updated in 2019.

In December 2015, John Julius Norwich stated, in a letter published in The Times newspaper, that as a historian he resorted to Wikipedia "at least a dozen times a day", and had "never caught it out". He described it as "a work of reference as useful as any in existence", with so wide a range that it is almost impossible to find a person, place, or thing that it has left uncovered and that he could never have written his last two books without it.

A 2017 MIT study suggests that words used in Wikipedia articles end up in scientific publications. Studies related to Wikipedia have been using machine learning and artificial intelligence to support various operations. One of the most important areas is the automatic detection of vandalism and data quality assessment in Wikipedia.

== Related projects ==
Several interactive multimedia encyclopedias incorporating entries written by the public existed long before Wikipedia was founded. The first of these was the 1986 BBC Domesday Project, which included text (entered on BBC Micro computers) and photographs from more than a million contributors in the UK, and covered the geography, art, and culture of the UK. This was the first interactive multimedia encyclopedia (and was also the first major multimedia document connected through internal links), with the majority of articles being accessible through an interactive map of the UK. The user interface and part of the content of the Domesday Project were emulated on a website until 2008.

Several free-content, collaborative encyclopedias were created around the same period as Wikipedia (e.g. Everything2), with many later being merged into the project (e.g. GNE). One of the most successful early online encyclopedias incorporating entries by the public was h2g2, which was created by Douglas Adams in 1999. The h2g2 encyclopedia is relatively lighthearted, focusing on articles which are both witty and informative.

Subsequent collaborative knowledge websites have drawn inspiration from Wikipedia. Others use more traditional peer review, such as Encyclopedia of Life and the online wiki encyclopedias Scholarpedia and Citizendium. The latter was started by Sanger in an attempt to create a reliable alternative to Wikipedia.

== See also ==
- Bibliography of Wikipedia
- Democratization of knowledge
- Interpedia – an early proposal for a collaborative Internet encyclopedia
- List of films about Wikipedia
- List of online encyclopedias
- List of Wikipedia controversies
- List of wikis
- Missing Links and Secret Histories
- Network effect
- Outline of Wikipedia – guide to the subject of Wikipedia presented as a tree structured list of its subtopics; for an outline of the contents of Wikipedia, see Wikipedia:Contents/Outlines
- QRpedia – multilingual, mobile interface to Wikipedia
- Wikipedia Review
