= Persian Wikipedia =

Persian-language version of Wikipedia

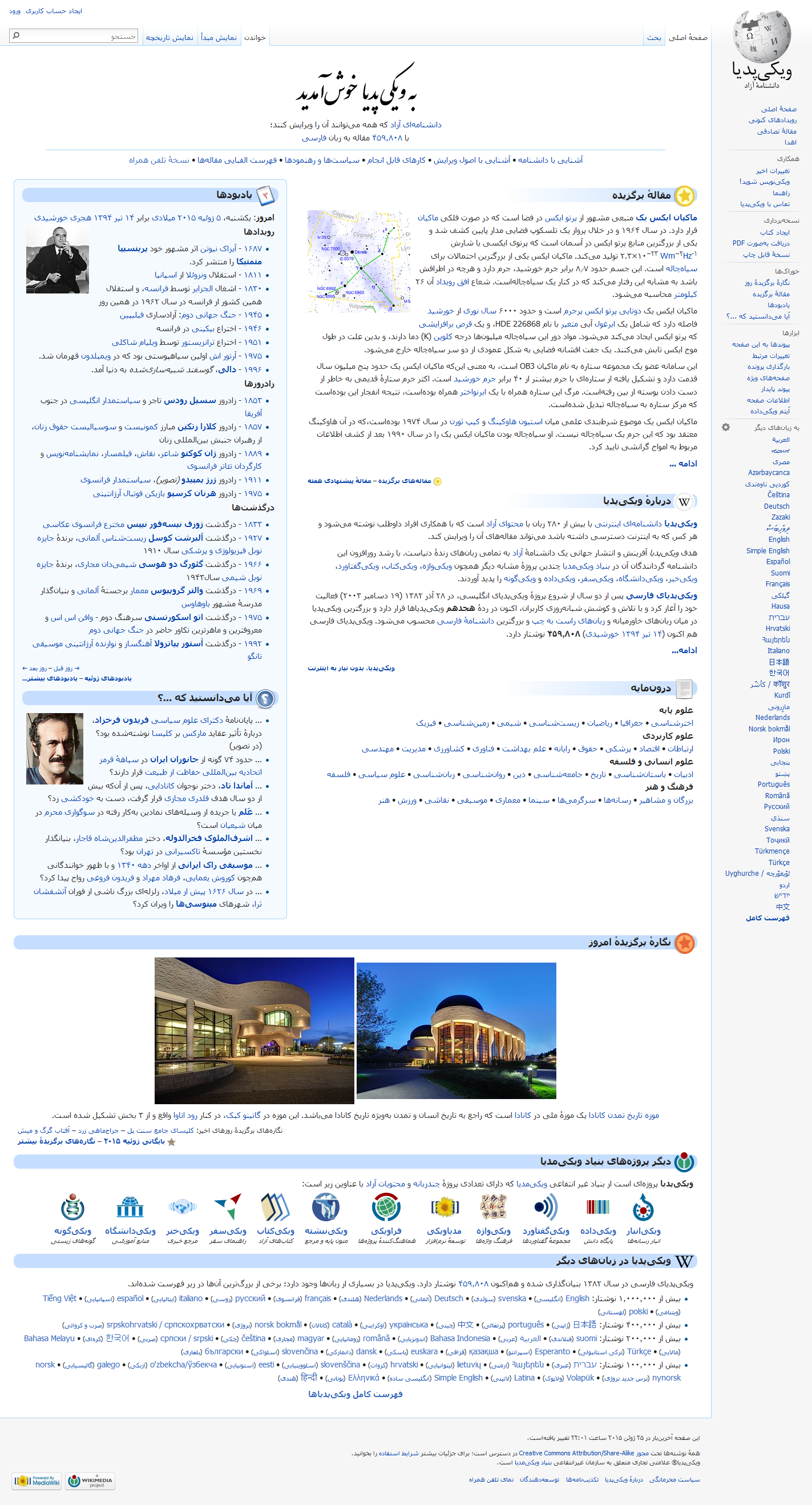
- Screenshot Main Page of the Persian Wikipedia in June 2011
- Native name: ویکی‌پدیا فارسی
- Website type: Internet encyclopedia
- Available in: Persian
- Owner: Wikimedia Foundation (non-profit)
- Website: fa.wikipedia.org
- Commercial: No
- Registration: Optional (required only for certain tasks such as editing protected pages, creating pages or uploading files)
- Users: 1,133,601 (total registered, as of 11 July 2022)
- Launched: 19 December 2003; 22 years ago
- Content license: Creative Commons Attribution/ Share-Alike 4.0 (most text also dual-licensed under GFDL); Media licensing varies

Persian Wikipedia (Persian: ویکی‌پدیای فارسی, romanized: Vîkîpediâ-ye Fârsî) is the Persian language version of Wikipedia. The Persian version of Wikipedia was started in December 2003. As of November 2026, it has 1,100,496 articles, 1,583,915 registered users, and 101,641 files, and it is the 19th largest edition of Wikipedia by article count, and ranks 22nd in terms of depth among Wikipedias. It passed 1,000 articles on 16 December 2004, and 200,000 on 10 July 2012. Roozbeh Pournader is the project's first administrator, developer, and bureaucrat.

It is the most popular language version of Wikipedia in Iran and Afghanistan.

== Number of articles ==
It currently has 1,100,496 articles, making it the 19th largest Wikipedia by article count.

History of starting and the number of articles:

- 19 December 2003: started
- 18 February 2006: reached 10,000 articles
- 30 October 2008: reached 50,000 articles
- 25 August 2010: reached 100,000 articles
- 9 July 2012: reached 200,000 articles
- 19 February 2013: reached 300,000 articles
- 18 July 2014: reached 400,000 articles
- 27 July 2016: reached 500,000 articles
- 3 May 2018: reached 600,000 articles
- 8 November 2019: reached 700,000 articles
- 26 May 2021: reached 800,000 articles
- 13 April 2022: reached 900,000 articles
- 22 April 2024: reached 1,000,000 articles
- 28 October 2026: reached 1,100,000 articles

== Article depth ==
With an article depth of 154, the Persian Wikipedia is currently ranked 23rd among all Wikipedias based on article depth.

== Issues ==
=== Government intervention ===
According to reports by human rights lawyer Shadi Sadr, RFERL, Iranwire, Iran International, Justice for Iran, Open Democracy, Radio Zamaneh and other news outlets, the Ministry of Islamic Culture and Guidance and the Iranian Cyber Army may be interfering with the Persian Wikipedia. In 2019, German news outlet Deutsche Welle reported that WMF had launched an investigation.

=== Censorship ===
In a November 2013 report published by the Center for Global Communication Studies of the University of Pennsylvania, researchers Collin Anderson and Nima Nazeri scanned 800,000 Persian language Wikipedia articles and found that the Iranian government blocks 963 of these pages. According to the authors, "Censors repeatedly targeted Wikipedia pages about government rivals, minority religious beliefs, and criticisms of the state, officials, and the police. Just under half of the blocked Wiki-pages are biographies, including pages about individuals the authorities have allegedly detained or killed." Anderson said that Persian Wikipedia, as a microcosm of the Iranian internet, is a "useful place to uncover the types of online content forbidden and an excellent template to identify keyword blocking themes and filtering rules that apply across the greater internet."

On 2 March 2020, during the COVID-19 pandemic in Iran, the Persian Wikipedia appeared to be disrupted in Iran after the death of Mohammad Mirmohammadi, who was a close confidant to the country's supreme leader, Ali Khamenei.

== Gallery ==
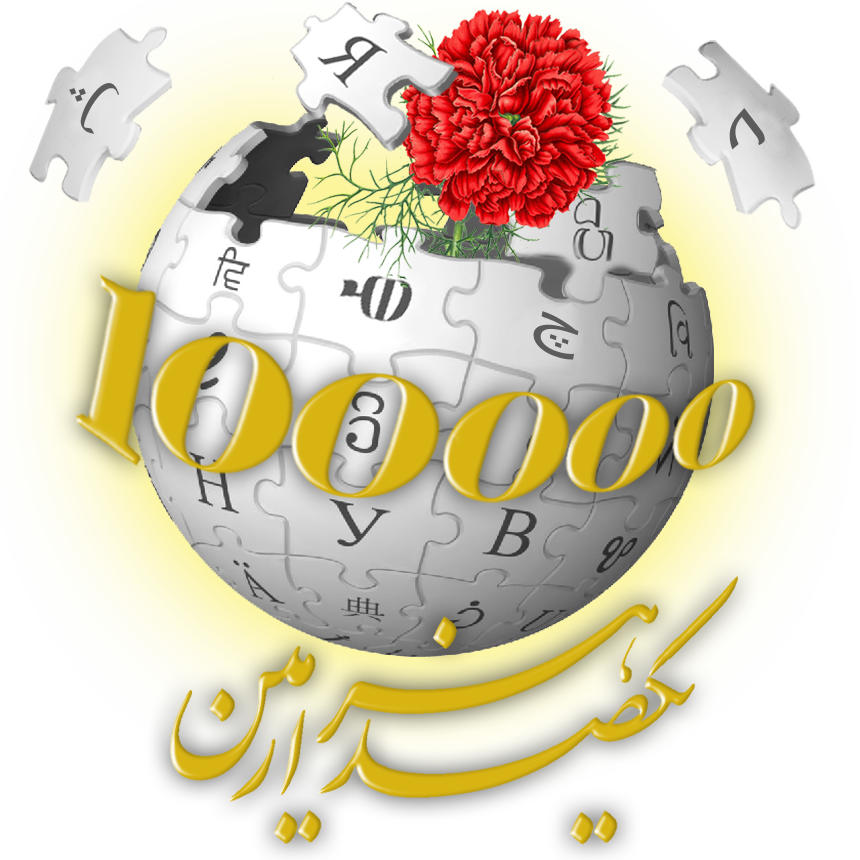
100,000 entries celebration logo (August 2010)

300,000 entries celebration logo (February 2013)

400,000 entries celebration logo (July 2014)

Persian Wikipedia's Nowruz logo (March 2015)

Persian Wikipedia's Nowruz logo (March 2016)

Persian Wikipedia's 500,000 articles logo (July 2016)

Persian Wikipedia's Nowruz logo (March 2017)

600,000 entries celebration logo (March 2018)

Persian Wikipedia's Nowruz logo (March 2019)

800,000 entries celebration logo (May 2021)

900,000 entries celebration logo (April 2022)

1,000,000 entries celebration logo (April 2024)

== See also ==
- List of Wikipedias
