= Geographical bias on Wikipedia =

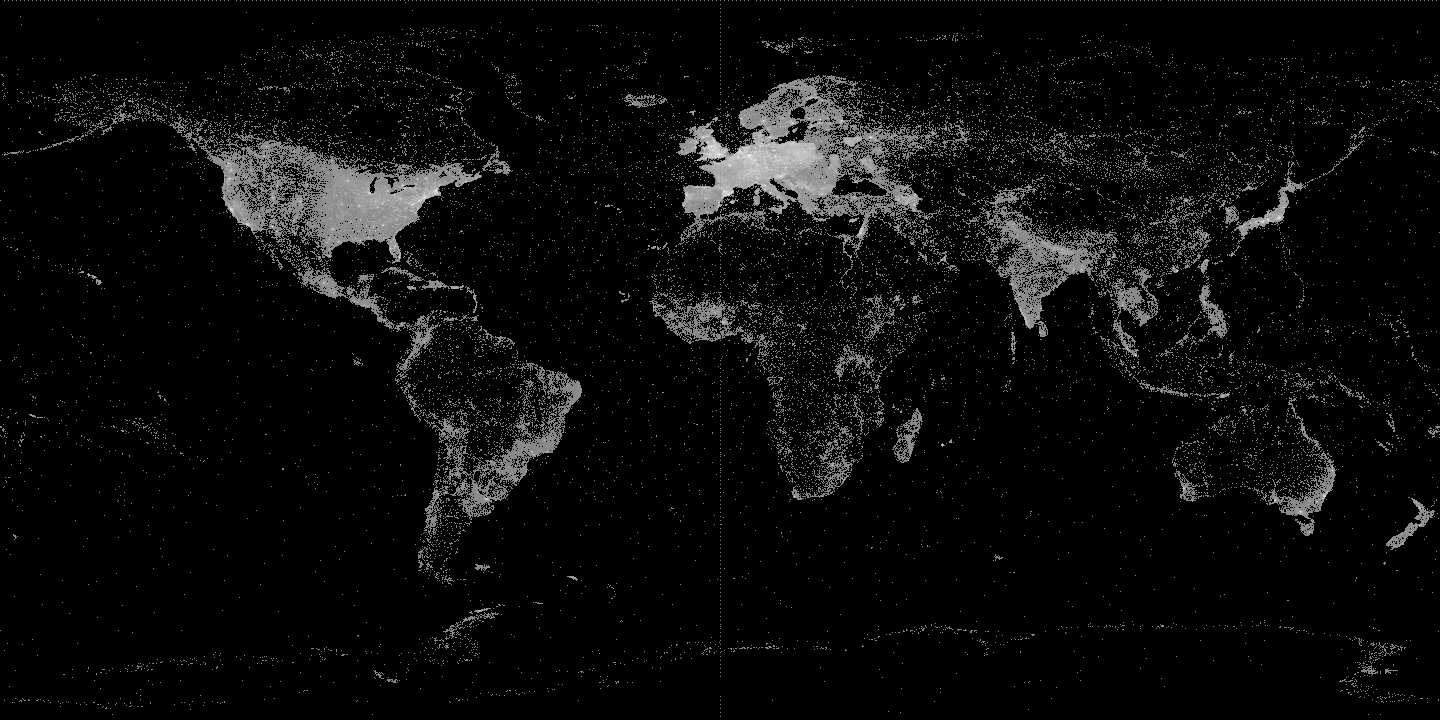
Worldwide density of geotagged Wikipedia entries (2013)

Wikipedia has been criticized for the inequality in the distribution of its volunteer-created content with respect to the geographical association of article subjects. The research shows that despite considerable differences of this distribution depending on the language of Wikipedia, there is a common trend towards more content related to the United States and Western Europe coupled with a lack of information about certain regions in the rest of the world.

== Analysis ==
Several studies on internet geography and Wikipedia were published by the members of the Oxford Internet Institute (OII).

A 2 December 2009 article by Mark Graham of OII in The Guardian presented a color-coded map of the world that illustrated the disparity between the numbers of geotagged Wikipedia articles (in all languages) for countries from the Global North versus the Global South. Graham wrote:

Almost the entire continent of Africa is geographically poorly represented in Wikipedia. Remarkably, there are more Wikipedia articles written about Antarctica than all but one of the 53 countries in Africa (or perhaps more amazingly, there are more Wikipedia articles written about the fictional places of Middle Earth and Discworld than about many countries in Africa, Asia, and the Americas).

A 2010 analysis of Wikipedia people edits revealed that Asia, despite being the most populous continent, was represented in only 16.67% of edits; Africa (6.35%) and South America (2.58%) were equally underrepresented. A 2011 study by OII found that 84 percent of articles tagged with a location were in Europe or North America, and that Antarctica had more entries than any African or South American nation. According to Adama Sanneh, the founder of the WikiAfrica Education initiative, as of 2021 there were more articles on the English Wikipedia about Paris than Africa.

In 2011 a breakdown by languages (Arabic, Egyptian Arabic, English, French, Hebrew, Persian and Swahili) was reported by OII. Graham reported some unexpected patterns in distributions; for example, Swahili Wikipedia has unusually many articles geotagged in Turkey. Graham explains this and similar artifacts by dedicated editors creating numerous stub articles in the areas of their interest.

A 2015 OII paper reported on a highly uneven geography of participation in editing Wikipedia. In particular, it found that contributors from low-income countries contribute to geographical imbalance by writing more about high-income countries than about their own.

A 2016 study by David Laniado and Marc Miquel Ribé empirically confirmed that cultural identity is a significant motivator for Wikipedia editors affecting their works in areas which may be associated with their identity, in particular, in Wikipedia categories "Culture" and "Geography". A similar conclusion was drawn in 2010 by Brent Hecht and Darren Gergle: Wikipedians tend to work on topics related to nearby locations. Laniado and Ribé suggest that in order to overcome the imbalance stemming from cultural identities, Wikipedia has to promote editors from different language Wikipedias to propagate their cultural identities into other Wikipedias. To this end, the translator and article recommendation tools developed by the Wikimedia Foundation may be of use by providing options to select preferential content based on the keywords related to cultural identity.

== See also ==
- List of countries by number of Internet users
