= Missing Links and Secret Histories =

2013 anthology by L. Timmel Duchamp

First edition

Missing Links and Secret Histories: A Selection of Wikipedia Entries from Across the Known Multiverse is a 2013 collection of short stories in the form of fictitious Wikipedia entries. The speculative fiction anthology was edited by L. Timmel Duchamp. The collection was published by Aqueduct Press, who issued a call for materials in 2011 asking writers to create "wikipedia-page-style entries".
