= Information technology in Bangladesh =

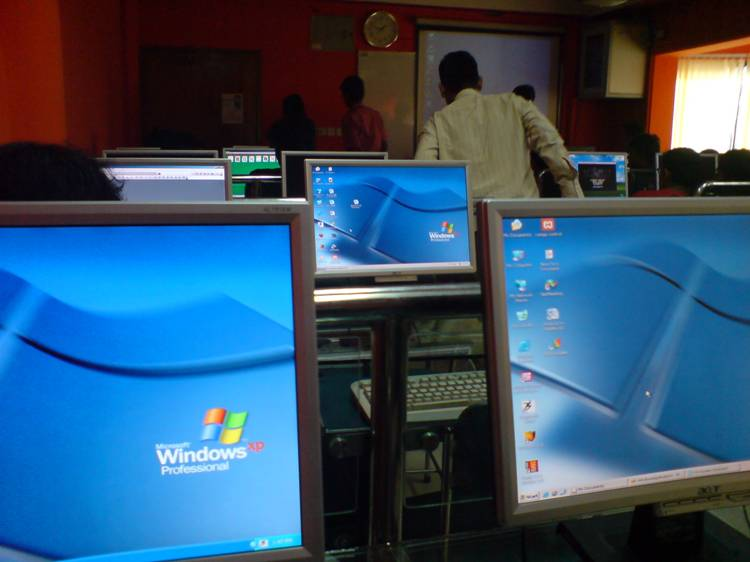
A computer lab in Bangladesh

The information technology sector in Bangladesh had its beginnings in nuclear research during the 1960s. Over the next few decades, computer use increased at large Bangladeshi organizations, mostly with IBM mainframe computers. However, the sector only started to get substantial attention during the 1990s. Today the sector is still in a nascent stage, though it is showing potential for advancement. Nonetheless, Bangladesh IT/ITES industry has fared comparatively well by achieving US$1.3 billion export earnings in FY 2020-21 and holding US$1.4 billion equivalent market share in the local market contributing 0.76 per cent to the GDP creating more than 1 million employment opportunities so far amid COVID-19 havoc that suddenly shattered businesses last year. Consequentially, riding on the successes of IT/ITES sector-supported export-led industries as well as pro-private sector and conducive policies pursued by Bangladesh Government, the country is now poised to become a Developing Country by 2026, as recommended by the United Nations Committee for Development Policy (UNCDP), besides, Bangladesh now seeks to transform itself into a knowledge-based and 4IR-driven cashless economy, aiming to become a developed country by 2041. The Bangladesh government has formulated a draft 'Made in Bangladesh– ICT Industry Strategy' aimed at turning Bangladesh into an ICT manufacturing hub, enhancing export of local products, attracting foreign investment and creating employment proposing to implement in three

Notif-info

terms— short term from 2021 to 2023, mid-term from 2021 to 2028 and long term from 2021 to 2031 for implementation of the 65 action plans.

== History ==
The first computer in East Pakistan was an IBM mainframe 1620 series, installed in 1964 at the Dhaka center of the Pakistan Atomic Energy Commission (later the Bangladesh Atomic Energy Commission). Computer use increased in the following years, especially after the independence of Bangladesh in 1971; more-advanced IT equipment began to be set up in different educational, research and financial institutions. In 1979, a computer centre, later renamed Department of Computer Science & Engineering, was established at Bangladesh University of Engineering and Technology (BUET); the centre has been playing a pivotal role in Bangladeshi IT education since its inception. Through the introduction of personal computers, the use of computers witnessed a rapid increase in the late 1980s. In 1985, succeeding several individual initiatives, the first Bengali script in computers was invented, paving the way for more intense computer activities. In 1995, use of the Internet began and locally made software started to be exported.

In 1983, the Ministry of Science and Technology established a National Computer Committee to create the required policies. The committee was also responsible to carry out programs to expand and promote the efficacious use of the sector. In 1988, the committee was replaced by the National Computer Board. In 1990, the ministry reformed the board and reconstituted it as the Bangladesh Computer Council to monitor computer- and IT-related works in the country.

== ICT industry ==
The ICT industry has emerged as a vital growth sector in the country's economy. The Bangladesh Association of Software and Information Services (BASIS) was established in 1997 as the national trade body for software and IT service industry. Starting with only 17 member companies, by 2009 membership had grown to 326. In a study among Asian countries by Japan International Cooperation Agency in 2007–08, Bangladesh was ranked first in software and IT services competitiveness and third in competencies, after India and China. The World Bank, in a study conducted in 2008, projected triple digit growth for Bangladesh in IT services and software exports. Bangladesh was also listed as one of the top 30 Countries for Offshore Services in 2010–2011 by Gartner. The Internet penetration has also grown to 21.27 percent in 2012, up from 3.2 percent three years prior.

The Information and Communications Technology (ICT) sector of the country has maintained 57.21 percent export growth on an average over the last nine years since 2009. In the fiscal year (FY) 2016–17, Bangladesh ICT sector registered export earnings worth US$0.8 billion from the global market and US$1.54 billion from the domestic market span – thereby making around one percent contribution to the gross domestic product (GDP). The ICT sector has created around three hundred thousand job opportunities so far. ICT exports of the country were projected to reach US$5 billion by 2025.

As the Internet usage increases, the government expected the IT sector to add 7.28 percent to GDP growth by 2021.
