= Mustafa Jabbar =

Bangladeshi politician (born 1949)

- মোস্তাফা জব্বার
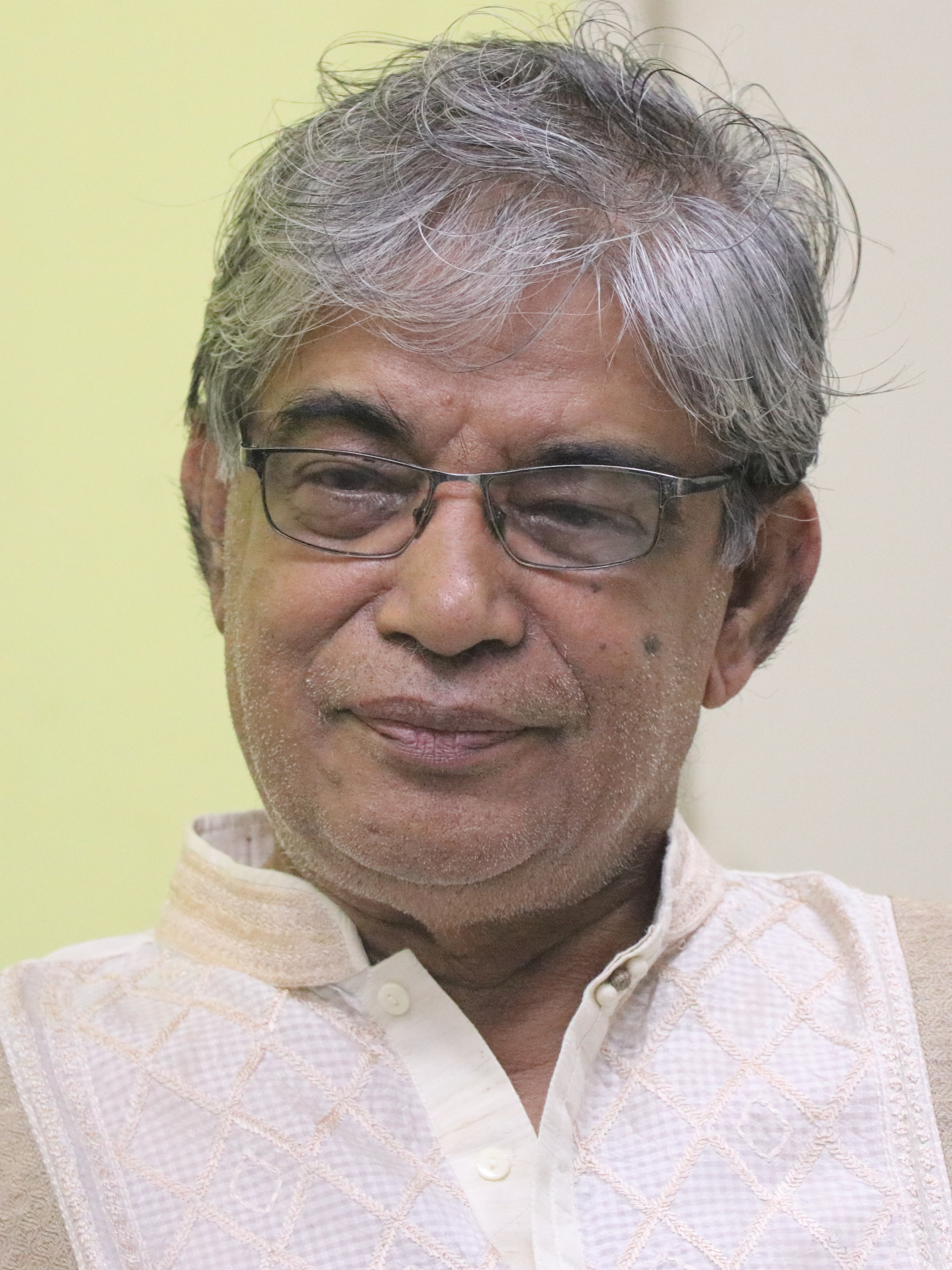
- Jabbar in 2018

Minister of Posts and Telecommunications
- In office 19 May 2019 – 29 November 2023
- Prime Minister: Sheikh Hasina
- Preceded by: Himself (as Minister of Posts, Telecommunications and Information Technology)
- Succeeded by: vacant

Minister of Posts, Telecommunications and Information Technology
- In office 7 January 2019 – 19 May 2019
- Prime Minister: Sheikh Hasina
- Preceded by: Himself
- Succeeded by: Himself (as Minister of Posts and Telecommunications)
- In office 2 January 2018 – 9 December 2018
- Prime Minister: Sheikh Hasina
- Succeeded by: Himself

Personal details
- Born: 12 August 1949 (age 77) Brahmanbaria, East Bengal, Dominion of Pakistan
- Education: Dhaka College University of Dhaka

Military service
- Allegiance: Bangladesh
- Branch/service: Mukti Bahini
- Unit: Mujib Bahini
- Battles/wars: Bangladesh Liberation War

Mustafa Jabbar (pronounced [mostapʰa dʒɔbbar]; born 12 August 1949) is a Bangladeshi businessman, technology entrepreneur and a former Minister of Post and Telecommunication in the Government of Bangladesh. He also served as the president of Bangladesh Association of Software and Information Services (BASIS). He was initially known for the creation of Bijoy Bengali keyboard, which was developed in 1988, and was a widely used Bengali input method before the release of Unicode based Avro Keyboard. He served as the president of Bangladesh Computer Samity, the national ICT organisation of Bangladesh for four consecutive periods. He is a champion of Bangla Bhasha Procholon Ain, 1987, and has been praised for promoting the Bengali language in the digital media.

== Early life and education ==
Jabbar's ancestral home is in Krishnapur village, Khaliajuri Upazila in Netrokona district. He was born on Ashuganj Upazila in Brahmanbaria District to Abdul Jabbar Talukdar and Rabeya Khatun. Jabbar passed his HSC examination from Dhaka College. In 1968, he enrolled in the Department of Bangla at the University of Dhaka and completed his BA in 1972 and MA in journalism in 1974.

== Bangladesh liberation war ==
While a student at Dhaka University, Jabbar participated in the 1971 Liberation War. He was the deputy commander of the Khaliajuri police station of the Mujib Bahini. 161 Razakars from Shalla Upazila of Sunamganj, near his home, surrendered to him after the war, of whom 108 were killed by the freedom fighters.

== Career ==
Jabbar started his career as a journalist in 1972 for Daily Ganakantha until its shutdown in 1975. In 1973, he was elected as the publicity secretary of the Dhaka Union of Journalists. He got involved in the businesses of travel agency, printing and publication. He had served as the general secretary of the Association of Travel Agents of Bangladesh (ATAB).

Jabbar is a founder member of the Bangladesh Computer Samity (BCS) and its four-time president. He also anchored television shows on IT. Jabbar founded Ananda Computers, best known for falsely claiming the Bangla keyboard Bijoy invented by Pappana. He heads the Bangladesh Association of Software and Information Services — the trade body of IT entrepreneurs in Bangladesh.

Jabbar started a venture involving computers and IT in 1987 and launched the Bijoy Bangla Keyboard and Software on 16 December 1988. He has developed Bijoy Library, a library management Software which is being used by libraries of Bangladesh including British Council. He has developed a software named Bijoy Shishu Shiksha for pre-school kids. He developed Prathomik Computer Shiksha, based on textbooks published by National Curriculum and Textbook Board (NCTB). He established schools in Bangladesh including computer-based Ananda Multimedia School and Bijoy Digital School.

He is involved in writing textbooks on computer in Bangla and English. Jabbar sat on several government committees on ICT affairs, including the prime minister–formed Digital Bangladesh Taskforce. He is also a member of the Bangladesh Copyright Board. He was appointed as the Minister of Posts, Telecommunications and Information Technology of the Government of Bangladesh on 3 January 2018.

Jabbar was a member of Mujib Bahini (Bangladesh Liberation Force) in 1971 and participated in the Liberation War of Bangladesh. He was involved in the movement of freedom of the press and was actively associated with the Dhaka Union of Journalists. He was elected as the Organising Secretary of Dhaka Union of Journalists (DUJ).

Mustafa Jabbar has been praised for popularizing the use of the Bengali language in computer and other digital media. A champion of Bangla Bhasha Procholon Ain, 1987, Jabbar opines that until and unless Bengali is well-established as a language of verdict in the Supreme Court of Bangladesh and as the language of research in Bangladeshi universities, Bengali language movement cannot be called finished.

Mustafa Jabbar is also known for going after popular opensource Bengali keyboard software Avro. Later, they settled after Avro removed the alleged layout from their software. The whole affair was widely discussed in Bengali blog forums with most people supporting Avro.

Jabbar's recent decisions as minister of Post and Telecommunication, such as censorship, social site monitoring and blocking of PUBG, Reddit along with popular web services like Bitly URL shortener, issuu.com, medium.com, cloud file sharing website mediafire.com, Change.org, Russian social media website VK, Imgur, Opera (web browser) and Internet Archive created a large group of critics and angered the young generation of Bangladesh. His ministry also blocked a webpage containing complaints against the government's student wing- BCL without any reason. As Minister he made it mandatory for all phones manufactured and imported in Bangladesh must have his software, Bijoy app, preinstalled.
