= BDCricTime =

Bangladeshi cricket news website

- Logo of BDCricTime
- Website type: Cricket news website
- Available in: English, Bengali
- Headquarters: Dhaka, Bangladesh
- Founder: Md. Jabed Ali (Editor-in-chief)
- Website: https://www.bdcrictime.com
- Commercial: Yes
- Launched: 21 September 2011
- Current status: Active

BDCricTime is a Bangladeshi cricket news website founded by Md. Jabed Ali on 21 September 2011. It publishes cricket news, match coverage, live scores and statistical information in Bengali and English, and also operates a mobile application.

In February 2026, BDCricTime received registration from the Ministry of Information and Broadcasting, becoming Bangladesh's first registered cricket news portal.

== History ==
BDCricTime was founded by Md. Jabed Ali in 2011 under the name BDCricTeam. It initially operated as a social media-based cricket platform before expanding its coverage across digital platforms.

In 2014, BDCricTime expanded its presence across several social media platforms. At the end of 2016, it changed its name from BDCricTeam to BDCricTime.

By 2021, BDCricTime was publishing cricket news and other features in Bengali and English, including live scores, tournament information, team and player details, ICC rankings and statistical information. It had more than 30 employees at the time.

In July 2021, BDCricTime launched an Android application featuring ball-by-ball live scores, tournament information, team and player details and ICC rankings.

In December 2025, BDCricTime reached 10 million followers on Facebook. The milestone was marked at an event in Mirpur attended by the then-president of Bangladesh Cricket Board Aminul Islam Bulbul and former Bangladesh national team captains Khaled Mashud and Mohammad Ashraful.

== Content ==
BDCricTime publishes cricket news and other features in Bengali and English, including live scores, tournament information, team and player details, ICC rankings and statistical information.

In July 2021, BDCricTime launched an Android application featuring ball-by-ball live scores, tournament information, team and player details and ICC rankings.

== Recognition ==
In 2019, BDCricTime was named first runner-up in the Media & Entertainment category at the BASIS National ICT Awards.

In September 2025, BDCricTime founder Md. Jabed Ali received the Commonwealth Business Excellence Award for Best Entrepreneur in Malaysia in recognition of his work in digital sports media through BDCricTime.

In September 2025, BDCricTime was honoured in the Journalism category at the National Influence Awards 2025, with Jabed Ali receiving the award on behalf of the organisation.

In March 2026, BDCricTime was honoured by the Australia chapter of the Television Reporters Unity of Bangladesh (TRAB) for its work in sports journalism. An honorary memento was presented to Jabed Ali during an event in Sydney.
