= Santali Wikipedia =

Santali-language edition of Wikipedia

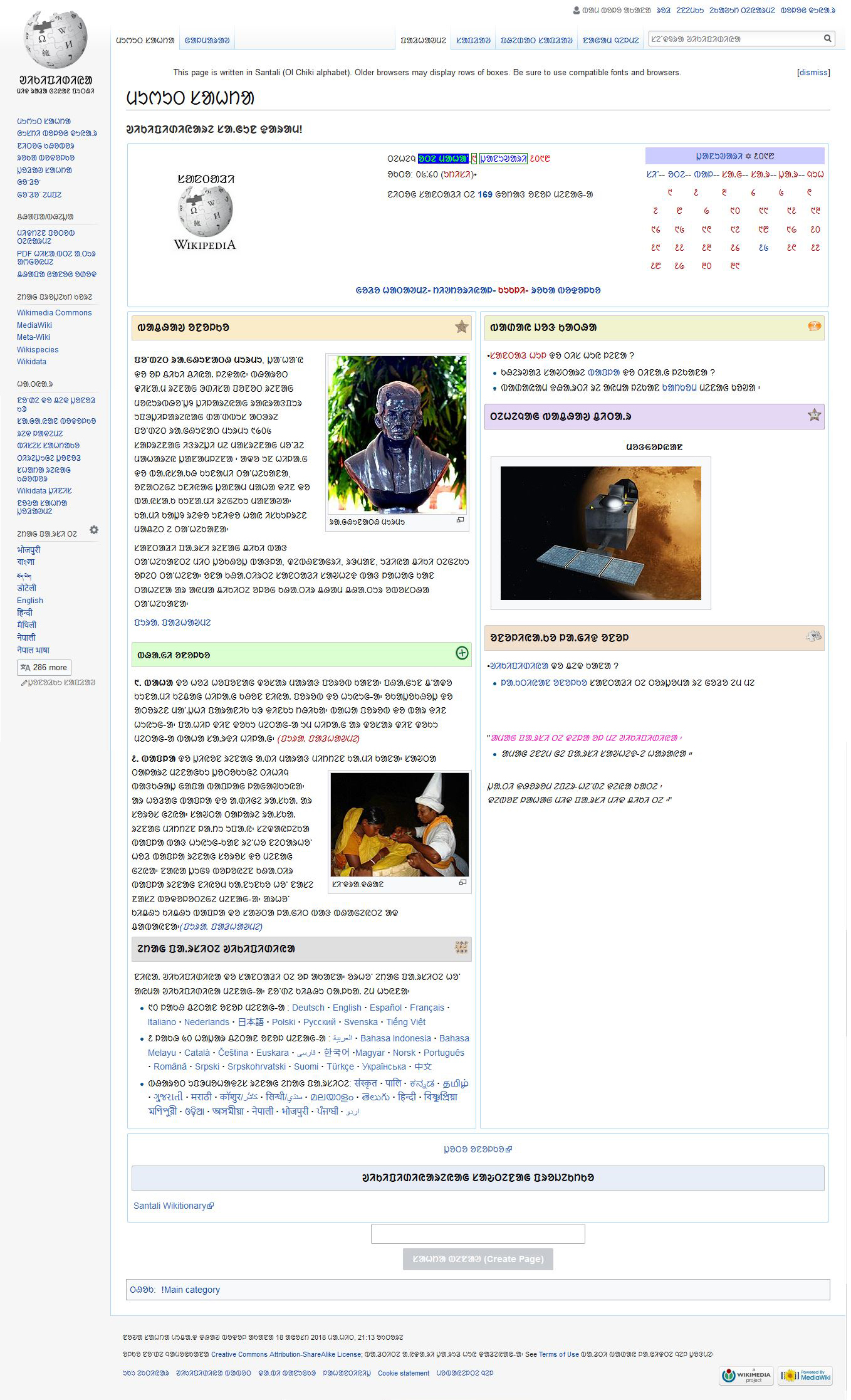
- Screenshot
- Website type: Internet encyclopedia
- Available in: Santali
- Headquarters: Miami, Florida
- Owner: Wikimedia Foundation
- Website: sat.wikipedia.org
- Commercial: No
- Registration: Optional
- Launched: 2 August 2018; 8 years ago
- Content license: Creative Commons Attribution/ Share-Alike 4.0 (most text also dual-licensed under GFDL); Media licensing varies

The Santali Wikipedia (Santali: ᱥᱟᱱᱛᱟᱲᱤ ᱣᱤᱠᱤᱯᱤᱰᱤᱭᱟ) is the Santali language version of Wikipedia, run by the Wikimedia Foundation. The site was launched on 2 August 2018. The Santali language's own alphabet, Ol Chiki, has been used as the alphabet of this Wikipedia. Santali is a language in the Munda subfamily of Austroasiatic languages, spoken by around 7.4 million people in South Asia (Bangladesh, India, Bhutan and Nepal).

== History ==
The process of creating a Santali-language Wikipedia began in 2012 and, later on, picked up momentum in February 2017. Back in 2012, Wikimedia Bangladesh organized a Wikipedia meetup and workshop with the Santali language community in Dinajpur District of Bangladesh with the goal of launching a Santali language Wikipedia.

However, that process slowed after some time.

Then in September 2017, Wikimedia Bangladesh organized another meeting with the Santali language community in a Dhaka Wikipedia meetup where a decision was made to expedite the launch of the Wikipedia. Following that discussion, a workshop was organized in Dhaka by Wikimedia Bangladesh for the Santali-language community on 30 December 2017.

The Santali-language community from India also participated in that program through online discussion. Subsequently, another workshop was organized for the Santali-language community in Odisha, India, on 11 March 2018 in collaboration with the Odia Wikimedians User Group.

After months of work, the Wikimedia Language Committee approved the Santali-language Wikipedia on 28 June 2018 and the Santali Wikipedia site was finally launched on 2 August 2018.

== Users and editors ==
Santali Wikipedia statistics
Number of user accounts	Number of articles	Number of files	Number of administrators
11531	16024	0	3

== Gallery ==
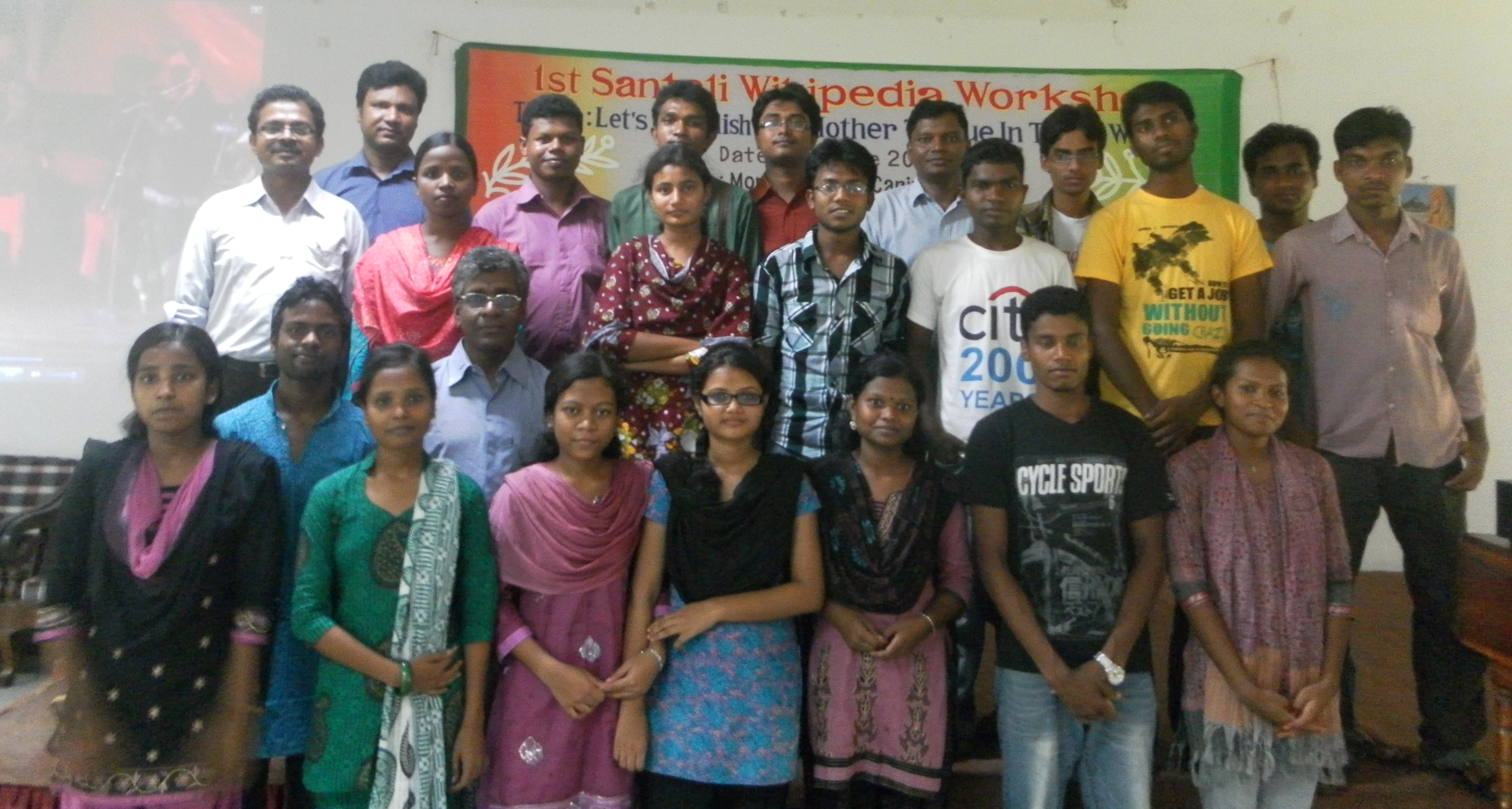
First Santali Wikipedia workshop in Bangladesh (2012).

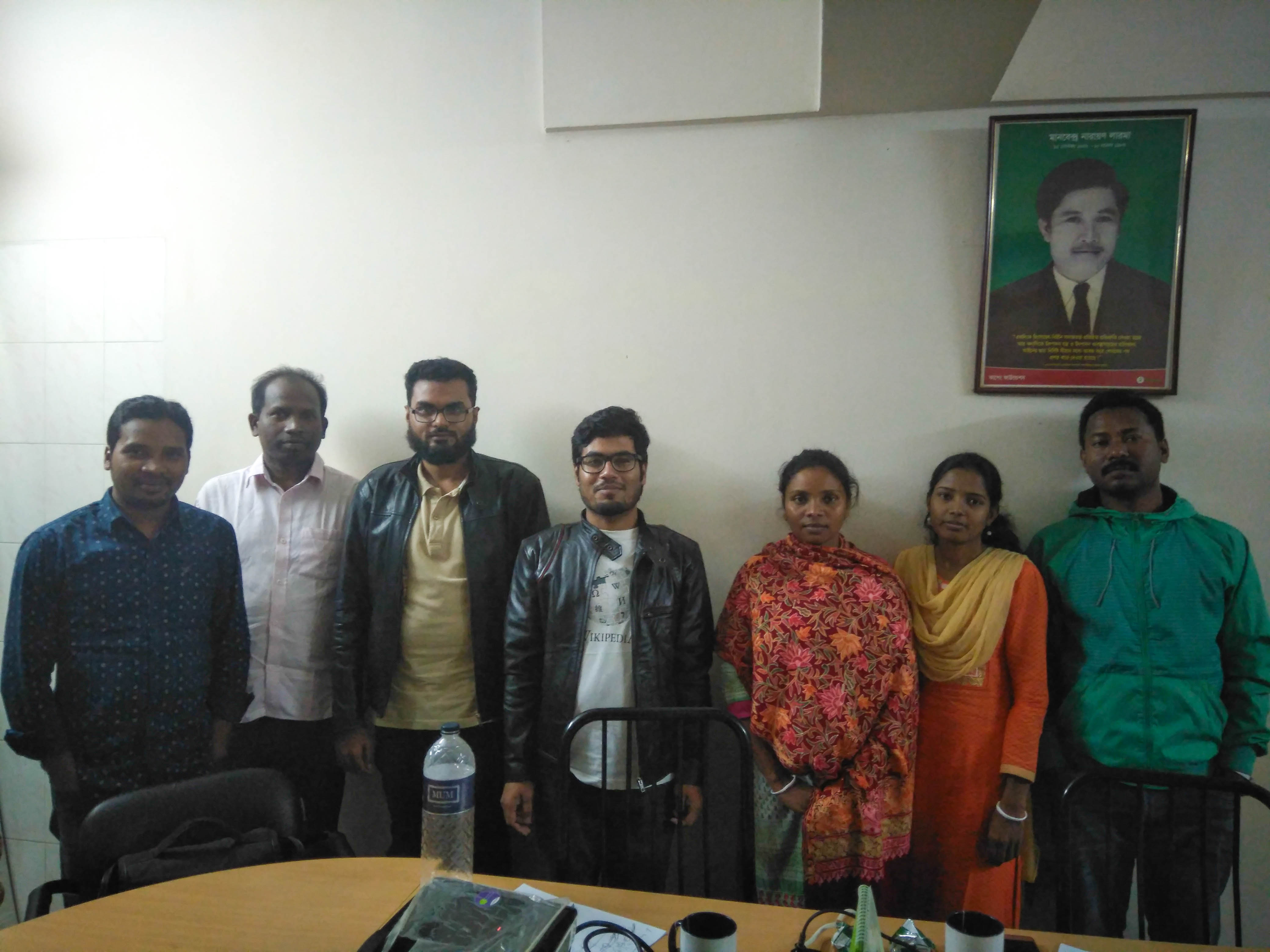
Workshop for Santali Wikipedia Community in Bangladesh (2017)

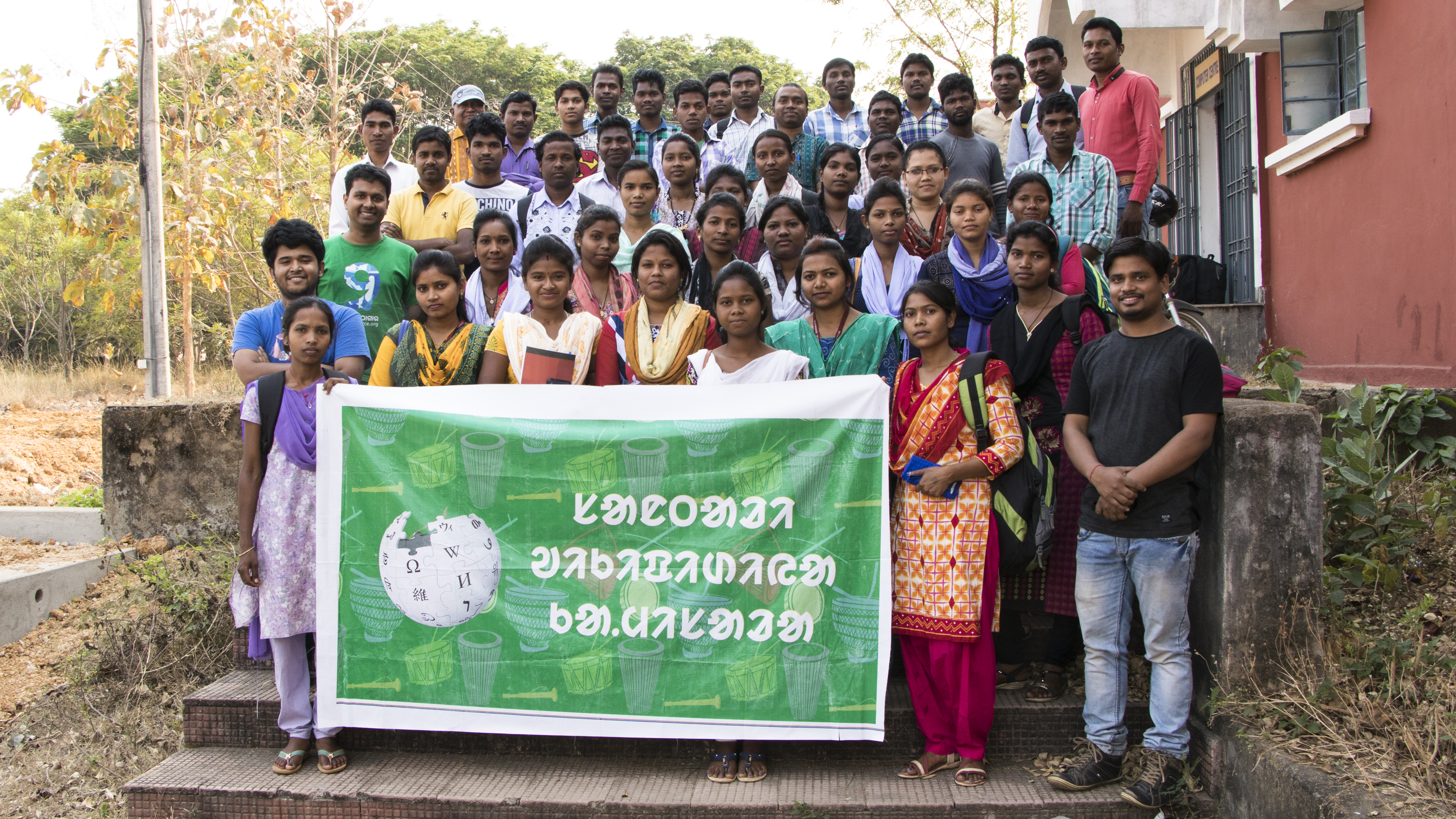
First Santali Wikipedia workshop in India (2018)

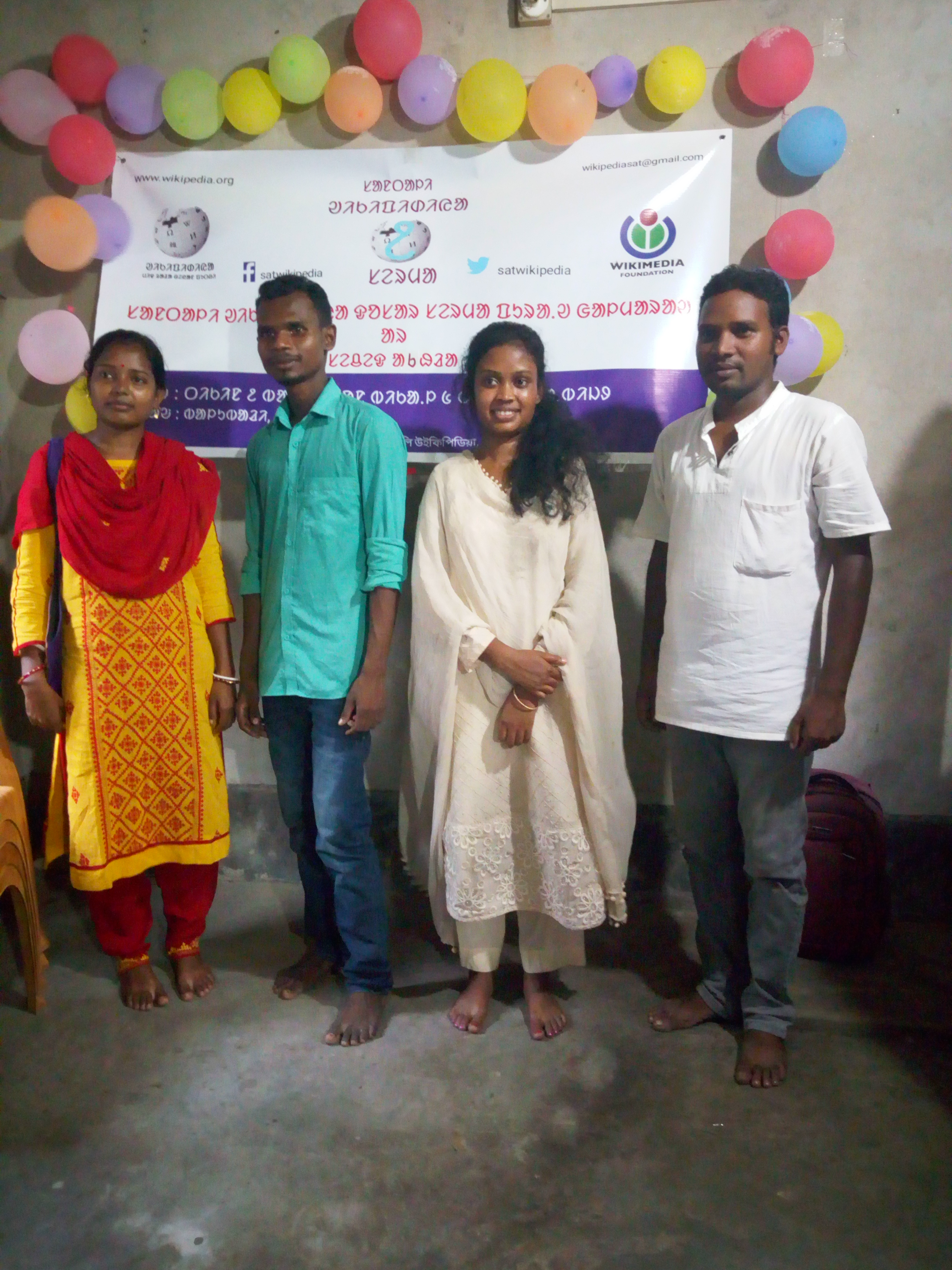
Santali Wikipedia workshop in Bangladesh (2020)

== See also ==
- Bengali Wikipedia
- Hindi Wikipedia
- Odia Wikipedia
- Tamil Wikipedia
- Telugu Wikipedia
