= Bangladesh Computer Samity =

Bangladeshi organization

Bangladesh Computer Samity [BCS]
- বাংলাদেশ কম্পিউটার সমিতি
- Formation: 1987
- Type: National association of the ICT companies
- Location: Dhaka, Bangladesh
- President: Engr. Subrata Sharkar
- Vice-President: Md. Rashed Ali Bhuiyan
- Secretary General: Kamruzzaman Bhuiyan
- Website: bcs.org.bd

Bangladesh Computer Samity, popularly known as BCS, is the national association of information and communication technologies companies in Bangladesh. It was established in 1987 in Dhaka, Bangladesh.

== About BCS ==
According to Joint Stock Companies and Firms in Bangladesh, Bangladesh Computer Samity is the first ICT trade association of Bangladesh. In 1993, BCS registered with Federation of Bangladesh Chambers of Commerce & Industries as an 'A' category member. And in 1998, they were registered as a member in WITSA. They are also an associate member of ASOCIO. Engr. Subrata Sarkar, Chairman of C & C Trade International, is serving as the president and MD. Rashed Ali Bhuiyan, Chairman of Star Tech & Engineering Ltd is serving as the vice President and Kamruzzaman Bhuiyan, proprietor of South Bangla Computers is currently serving as Secretary General of Bangladesh Computer Samity. It is also the platform of all distributors, dealers, resellers of computer and allied products, locally assembled computer vendors, software developers and internet service providers, exporters.

== BCS branches ==
BCS has eight branches and executive committees among the Bangladesh for smooth operation. Branches are Sylhet, Khulna, Rajshahi, Mymensingh, Chittagong, Barisal, Jessore and Comilla.

== Affiliations ==
- Asian-Oceanian Computing Industry Organization
- World Information Technology and Services Alliance
- Federation of Bangladesh Chambers of Commerce & Industries
- Ministry of Commerce (Bangladesh)
- Business Promotion Council (BPC)
- Bangladesh Association of Software and Information Services
- Bangladesh Computer Council
