= Avro Keyboard =

Graphical keyboard software

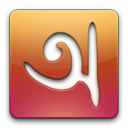

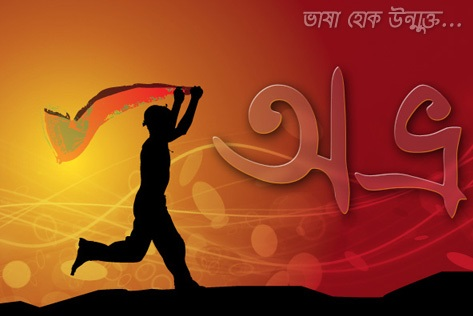
- Avro Keyboard 5.6.0 Splash Screen
- Original author: Mehdi Hasan Khan
- Developer: OmicronLab
- Release: 26 March 2003

Stable release(s)
- Windows: 5.6.0 / 27 August 2019; 7 years ago
- Linux: 1.2 / 26 April 2020; 6 years ago
- MacOS: 1.5 / 14 December 2018; 7 years ago
- Written in: C++, Delphi, JavaScript, Objective-C, Visual Basic (Historical), Go (Experimental) (Keyboard), Java, Python, JavaScript (Phonetic layout implementation)
- Operating system: Windows (Avro); Linux (ibus-avro); MacOS (iAvro); Web (avro-pad)
- Available in: English
- Type: Keyboard Software, Input method
- License: Open Source, Mozilla Public License 1.1
- Website: www.omicronlab.com
- Repository: github.com/omicronlab

Avro Keyboard (Bengali: অভ্র কিবোর্ড) is a free and open source graphical keyboard software developed by OmicronLab for Microsoft Windows, Linux, and macOS. Several other applications have adapted its phonetic layout for Android and iOS operating systems. It is the first free Unicode and ANSI compliant Bengali keyboard interface for Windows. It was published on 26 March 2003, which is notably Bangladesh's Independence Day.

Avro Keyboard has support for fixed keyboard layout and a phonetic layout named "Avro Phonetic", which allows typing Bengali through romanized transliteration. Additional features include auto correction, spell checker, a font fixer tool to set the default Bengali font, a keyboard layout editor, a Unicode to ANSI converter, an ANSI to Unicode converter, and a set of Bengali Unicode and ANSI fonts. This software is provided in a Standard Installer Edition and a Portable Edition for Windows.

== Development ==
Development of Avro Keyboard began in 2003 by Mehdi Hasan Khan, a student from Mymensingh Medical College. It was first published on the web for free download on 26 March 2003 under the Creative Commons Attribution-NoDerivs 3.0 Unported License. Initially, it was developed in Visual Basic, which was later transferred to Delphi. After discussion, OmicronLab published the source code of the Windows version under MPL 1.1 license with the Avro Keyboard 5.0.5 public beta 1.

Initially, the Linux version, v0.0.1, was written in C++ using scim, licensed under the GPLv2 license on 2 September 2009. Later, it moved to iBus and JavaScript for its Linux version, first released on 20 July 2012, under MPL. Avro was further developed primarily by Sarim Khan, along with Rifat Un Nabi, Tanbin Islam Siyam, Ryan Kamal, Shabab Mustafa and Nipon Haque from OmicronLab. As of March 2021, the JavaScript version was frozen, with porting allegedly underway to Golang.

The macOS version, written in Objective-C, was released on 15 December 2013. Several language implementations and bindings are maintained officially. A web-based version was also made available.

== Features ==
=== Portable edition of Avro Keyboard ===
A portable edition of the Avro Keyboard for Windows was released on 2 July 2007. It does not need any installation or access as an administrator and is suitable to carry on portable media (such as USB drives). It was released with a built-in 'automatic virtual font installer'. The size of the portable edition is smaller than the standard edition.

=== Avro Phonetic Layout ===
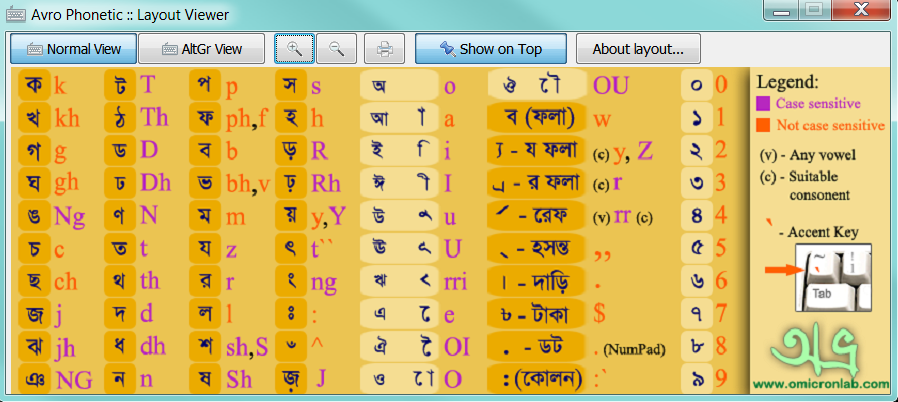
The Avro Phonetic Keyboard Layout.

Apart from providing traditional layouts, Avro developed a new layout which provides phonetic typing, that allows Roman transliteration to Bengali. The layout is adopted by various other keyboard software including the Ridmik Keyboard (Android and iOS), Borno Keyboard (Android and Windows), OpenBangla Keyboard (Linux) and others. It is also used by the Universal Language Selector of Wiki projects for Bengali input. Firefox OS utilizes its JavaScript implementation for Bengali input, along with the Probhat layout.

== Awards and recognition ==
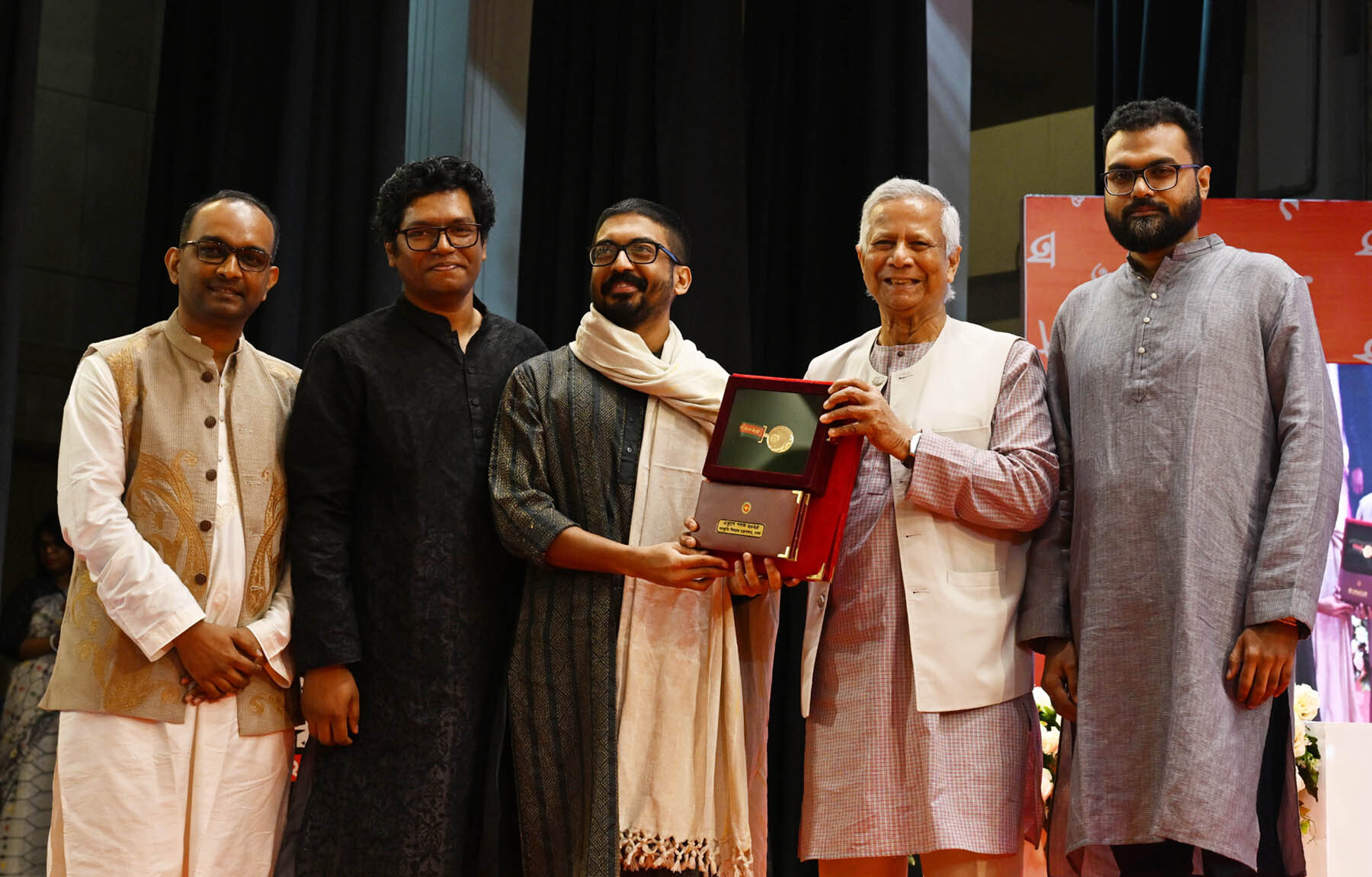
Muhammad Yunus giving Ekushey Padak 2025 to Avro Keyboard Team.

- In 2025, Avro Keyboard's inventor, Mehdi Hasan Khan and three others, received the second-highest civilian award of Bangladesh, the Ekushey Padak, for the invention of the software.
- Avro Keyboard was added to the online solution directory of Microsoft for Indic language input.
- Avro Keyboard was listed as a useful Bengali computing resource by the Unicode Consortium.
- The Bangladesh Election Commission used Avro Keyboard for internal use.
- It has been added as a built-in keyboard in Bengali Wikipedia.
- Bangladesh Association of Software and Information Services gave the 'Special Contribution to IT Award 2011' to the Avro team for Avro Keyboard Software on 4 February 2011.

== Conflict with Bijoy ==
=== Beginning ===
On 4 April 2010, Mustafa Jabbar, the proprietor of the commercial and closed-source Bijoy software and CEO of Ananda Computers, said in an article on the daily Janakantha that hackers were responsible for spreading unlicensed copies of Bijoy on the internet. He accused the UNDP of helping these alleged hackers. He further claimed that the UNDP influenced the selection of Avro for the national ID database project of the Bangladesh Election Commission. Avro developers denied all allegations and accused Jabbar of continuous harassment in different stages and media. They also accused Jabbar of calling them thieves and for that their petition was ignored in the media. They said that the developers behind Bengali computing happened to work under threat of legal persecution from law enforcement agencies. They also claimed that Jabbar only complained against Avro because he lost around 50 million taka in business from the Bangladesh Election Commission that used the free Avro software instead of the commercial Bijoy software in the national ID database project.

=== Reaction ===
In the Bangla blogosphere and Bangladeshi Facebook, people were angered and protested following the claims that Avro was a pirated version of Bijoy and that the Avro team were being called "hackers". The Avro team was praised for saving around 50 million taka for the Bangladesh Election Commission.

=== Legal proceeding ===
UniBijoy was a keyboard layout, which was supplied with Avro Keyboard 4.5.1. On 25 April 2010, Jabbar filed an application for copyright violation to the Bangladesh Copyright Office claiming that UniBijoy is a copy of Bijoy.

=== Settlement ===
A settlement was made between Khan and Jabbar in a formal meeting on 16 June 2010 in a Bangladesh Computer Council office in Agargaon, Dhaka in the presence of many IT experts. According to the settlement, Khan agreed to remove the UniBijoy Keyboard layout from the Avro Keyboard software and Jabbar agreed to withdraw the allegations of copyright violation from the Bangladesh Copyright Office before 20 August 2010. As a result, the UniBijoy Keyboard layout was removed from the Avro Keyboard version 4.5.2 which was released on 20 August 2010. Jabbar informed that the trial in the copyright office was withheld and would be withdrawn. He congratulated Khan and said, "Mehdi Hasan Khan has withdrawn Unibijoy from Avro, so I congratulate him for that. I respect his creativity. It is my wish that the Avro software further improves."
