= Bengali input methods =

Systems for typing the characters of Bengali script

Bengali input methods refer to different systems developed to type the characters of the Bengali script for the Bengali language and others, using a typewriter or a computer keyboard.

== Fixed computer layouts ==
With the advent of graphical user interfaces and word processing in the 1980s, a number of computer typing systems for Bengali were created. Most of these were originally based on Apple Macintosh systems.

=== Shahidlipi ===
Bangla Shahidlipi layout by Saifuddahar Shahid. In this layout figure, only primary characters are shown.

Shahidlipi (Bengali: শহীদলিপি, lit. 'Martyr Script') was the first Bengali keyboard developed for the computer by Saifuddahar Shahid in 1985. It was a phonetic-based layout on QWERTY for Macintosh computers. This keyboard was popular until the release of Bijoy keyboard. There were about 182 characters and partial conjunct characters under the Normal, Shift, AltGr, and Shift AltGr layers.

=== Munier keyboard ===
Bangla Munier layout by Munier Choudhury

Munier keyboard layout comes from a Bengali typewriter layout named Munier-Optima. In 1965, Munier Choudhury redesigned the keyboard of Bengali typewriter in collaboration with Remington typewriters of the then East Germany. Munier-Optima was the most-used typewriter in Bangladesh. So, many software developers implemented this layout on their keyboard. This layout is optimized for Unicode by Ekushey.

=== UniJoy keyboard ===
Bangla Unijoy layout by Ekushey

UniJoy keyboard was standardized by Ekushey for Unicode. It was included in the m17n database by Kenichi Handa under the GNU Lesser General Public License on 7 December 2005 under the copyright of the National Institute of Advanced Industrial Science and Technology (AIST).

=== Bangla Jatiyo ===
Bangla Jatiyo layout by Bangladesh Computer Council

Bangla Jatiyo Keyboard (Bengali: জাতীয়, lit. 'National') layout developed by the Bangladesh Computer Council. It is considered to be the standard layout and used as the official layout in Bangladesh.

In 2004, an initiative was taken to develop a national Bangla computer keyboard. The initiative was taken to solve the problem caused by the existence of multiple keyboards (such as Bijoy, Bashundhara, Munier, Borno, Lekhoni etc.) in Bangladesh during that period, to set a standard layout of Bengali keyboard. In view of this, the Bangladesh Computer Council completed the task of formulating the National Bangla Computer Keyboard by reviewing the various Bangla keyboards existing in the country.

Following the review of Bangladesh Computer Council, BSTI declared the keyboard as the national standard for Bengali computer keyboard known as Bangladesh Standard BDS 1738:2004. Letters and symbols are arranged in a total of four levels in Jatiyo Bangla keyboard. The most frequently used letters, symbols and ligatures are arranged in the first and second levels, while the less frequently used letters and symbols are placed in the third and fourth levels.

Meanwhile, the National Committee on Standardization of Bengali Language in Information Technology felt the need to modernize the existing National Bengali Computer Keyboard. In view of this, BCC carried out the modernization work and sent it to BSTI, which approved the work as BDS 1738:2018. Bangladesh Computer Council develops Windows and Linux software for national keyboard use.

In 2017, Bangladesh Computer Council revised the national keyboard layout and announced the most popular Bijoy keyboard layout as the national keyboard layout.

=== Bengali Inscript ===
Bengali Inscript layout by Microsoft

This keyboard layout is designed in order to type all the Indic scripts with a uniform layout on computer. This layout is officially accepted by Microsoft and is provided by default in their Windows operating system. It is also available on macOS, alongside Bengali-Qwerty. This layout is popular mainly in India.

=== Probhat ===
Bengali Probhat layout by Ekushey

Probhat (Bengali: প্রভাত, lit. 'Dawn') is a free Unicode-based Bengali fixed layout. Probhat is included in almost all Linux distributions. Its key mapping is similar to Phonetic pattern but typing method is fully fixed.

=== Bijoy ===
Bijoy layout by Ananda Computer

Bijoy keyboard layout is a proprietary layout of Mustafa Jabbar. It is licensed under the Bangladesh Copyright Act 2005. Bijoy keyboard, with related software and fonts, was first published in December 1998 for Macintosh computers. the Windows version of Bijoy Keyboard was first published in March 1993. The first version of Bijoy software was developed in India (possibly by an Indian programmer). Subsequent versions were developed in Bangladesh by Ananda Computers' team of developers including Munirul Abedin Pappana, who worked for Bijoy 5.0, popularly known as Bijoy 2000. Version 3.0 is the latest version of Bijoy layout. Bijoy keyboard was most widely used in Bangladesh until the release of Unicode-based Avro Keyboard. It has an AltGr character and vowel sign input system with its software different from the Unicode Standard. This is an ASCII-Unicode-based Bengali input software and requires the purchase of a license to use on every computer.

=== Baishakhi ===
Baishakhi layout by SNLTR

Baishakhi (Bengali: বৈশাখী, refers to the month of Boishakh) keyboard is developed by Society for Natural Language Technology Research (SNLTR). It is mainly used in Indian governmental work. This layout is available in most common Linux Distributions.

=== Uni Gitanjali ===
Uni Gitanjali layout by SNLTR

Gitanjali (Bengali: গীতাঞ্জলি, lit. ''Song offering'') Keyboard is customized for Unicode compliant to Uni Gitanjali Keyboard by Society for Natural Language Technology Research (SNLTR). It is mainly used in Indian governmental work. This layout is available in most common Linux Distributions.

=== Disha ===
Disha layout by Sayak Sarkar

Disha keyboard is based on Probhat layout and created by Sayak Sarkar. This layout is available in the m17n database as proposed by Ankur Group. This keyboard aims to create a visual typing method for Bengali.

== Phonetic computer layouts ==
=== Akkhor ===
Akkhor (Bengali: অক্ষর, lit. 'Character'), developed by Khan Md. Anwarus Salam, was first released on 1 January 2003 for free. The Unicode/ANSI-based Akkhor Keyboard is compatible with fixed keyboard layouts, including the Bijoy keyboard. Akkhor also provides a customization feature for designing fixed keyboard layouts. It provides a Keyboard Manager, which works system-wide and also provides an independent Akkhor Word processor.

=== Avro ===
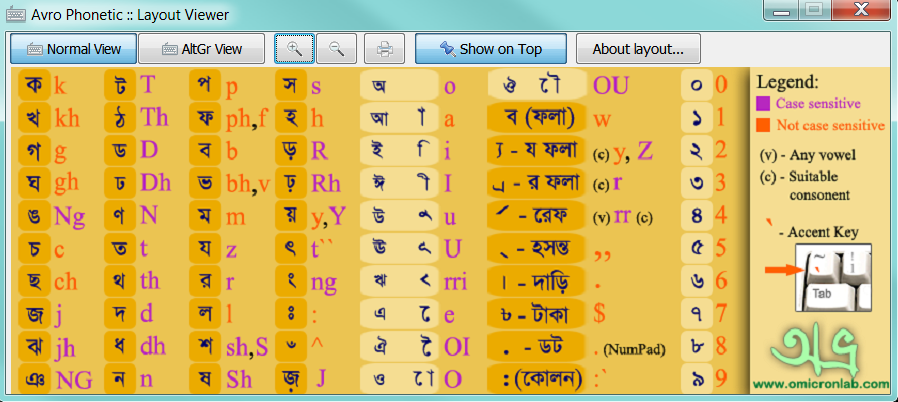
Avro Phonetic Keyboard Layout

Avro Keyboard (Bengali: অভ্র কী-বোর্ড), developed by Mehdi Hasan Khan and available online, was first released on 26 March 2003 for free. It facilitates both fixed and phonetic layouts. Avro phonetic allows a user to write Bengali by typing the phonetic formation of the words in English-language keyboards. Avro is available as a native IME on Microsoft Windows, macOS and Linux distributions. It was built-in Bengali IM in Firefox OS.

=== Bakkhor ===
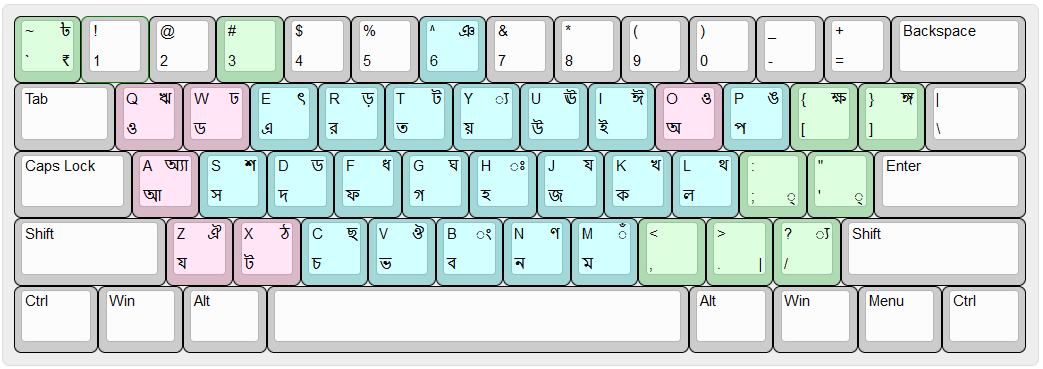
Bakkhor Bengali Keyboard Layout

Bakkhor (portmanteau of বাংলায় সাক্ষর, meaning Bengali literacy) Developed by Ensel Software and available online. It is open-source and JavaScript based. It allows some letters to be typed in multiple ways in order to type using lower case letters only in mobile devices.

=== Google Bengali transliteration ===
There is a free transliteration web site and software package for Bengali scripts from Google.

=== Microsoft Bengali transliteration ===
Along with other Indic languages, Microsoft has web based and desktop transliteration support for Bengali.

=== Bangla Onkur ===
Bangla Onkur (Bengali: অঙ্কুর, lit. 'Sprout') pronounced onkur, developed by S. M. Raiyan Kabir, was first released on 30 March 2011 as an open-source software. It facilitates only phonetic typing in Macintosh platform. Bangla Onkur phonetic allows a user to write Bengali by typing the phonetic formation of the words in English language keyboards. This is the first phonetic input method developed for Mac OS X.

=== Saon Bengali ===
This is an m17n library, which provides the Saon (Bengali: শাওন, refers to the month of Srabon) Bengali input method for touch typing in Bengali on Linux systems and the project was registered by its creator, Saoni at SourceForge on 8 July 2012. This free and open source IM is Unicode 6.1 compliant in terms of both normalization and number of keystrokes used to input a single character. Saon Bengali enables touch typing so if a user can type in English, they will not have to look at the keyboard to type in Saon Bengali. It is also phonetic and has something in common with all Bengali phonetic layouts making the transition smooth for new users. As of July 2012, it is not yet a part of the m17n-contrib, which allows installation of all m17n contributed libraries through Linux's software channels and it may be too early to say whether it will be incorporated. This depends firstly on its author and then if it is offered to m17n then probably on m17n. The m17n IM engine currently works with IBus among others on Linux. The copyright notice on Saon says, "You can redistribute this and/or modify it under the GNU LGPL 2.1 or later."

=== Open Bangla Keyboard ===
Open Bangla Keyboard is an open source, Unicode compliant, Bangla input method for Linux systems. It is a full-fledged Bangla input method with many famous typing methods and typing automation tools.

OpenBangla Keyboard comes with the popular Avro Phonetic, which is the de facto phonetic transliteration method for writing Bangla. It also includes multiple fixed keyboard layouts such as Probhat, Munir Optima, National (Jatiya) etc., which are very popular among professional writers.

Most features of Avro Keyboard are present in OpenBangla Keyboard.

=== Borno ===
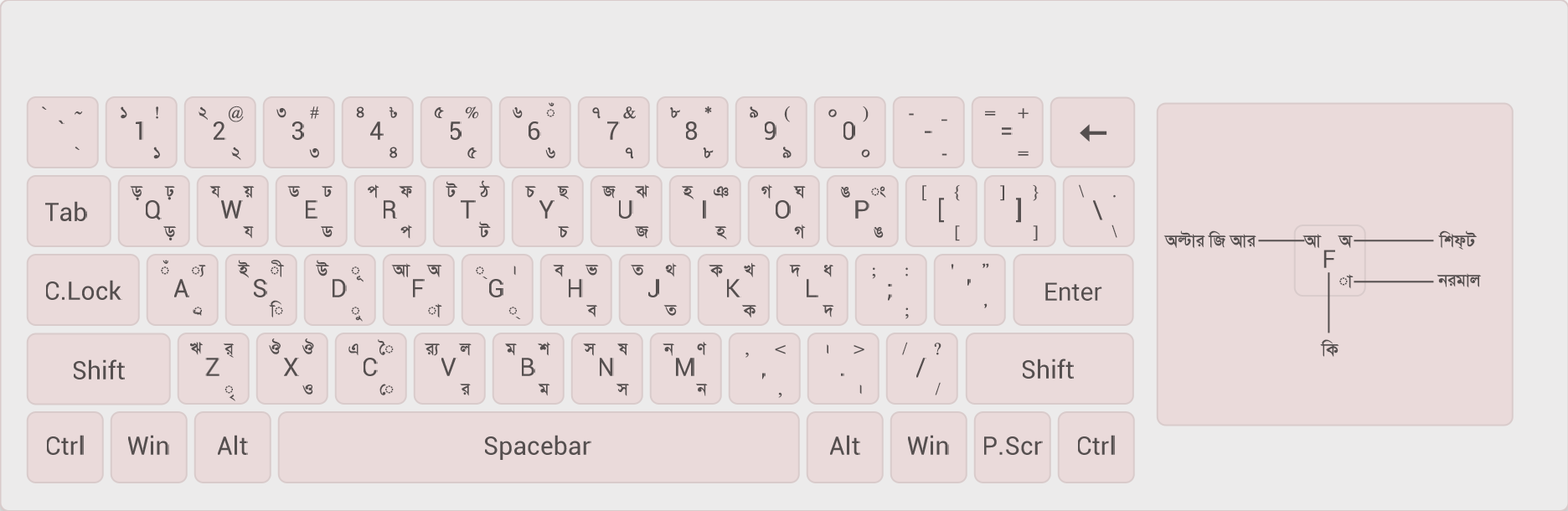
"Borno", The default fixed keyboard layout of Borno. Created by Codepotro.

Borno (Bengali: বর্ণ, lit. 'Letter') is a free Bengali input method editor developed by Jayed Ahsan. Borno is compatible with the latest version of Unicode and all versions of Windows operating systems. It was first released on 9 November 2018.

Borno supports both fixed and phonetic keyboard layouts. It supports both ANSI and Unicode.

=== Khipro ===
Khipro Layout by KhiproTeam

In 2024, KhiproTeam introduced the Khipro (Bengali: ক্ষিপ্র) concept—a compositional keyboard layout designed to free users from the hassle of repeatedly pressing Shift in conventional phonetic layouts and the difficulty of typing unconventional or non-standard spellings. It is neither purely phonetic nor fixed. This open-source layout is currently available for Android, Linux, and Windows.

== Mobile phone layouts ==
The Bengali keyboard layout used in mobile devices is typically a modified version of the PC's keyboard, tailored to fit the relatively smaller screen. For instance, the Unijoy keyboard designed for desktop PCs is adapted as Unijoy (Virtual) Keyboard for mobile devices. There is also software for users to type Bengali on mobile phones and smartphones.

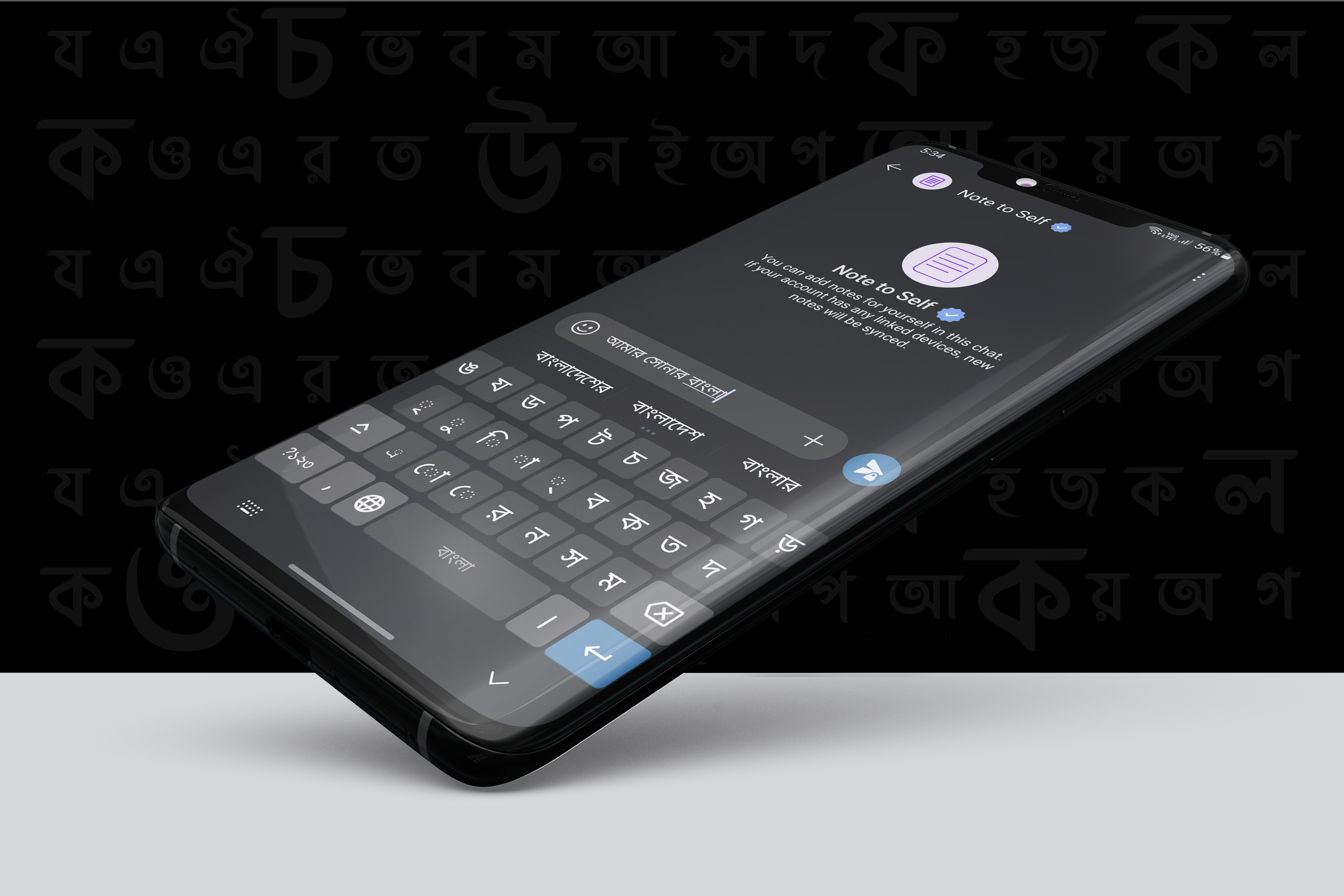
Modified Unijoy keyboard to fit the phone screen on an Android device

Unijoy layout optimized for smartphone virtual keyboard

Unijoy layout optimized for smartphone virtual keyboard (Shifted)

=== Ridmik Keyboard ===
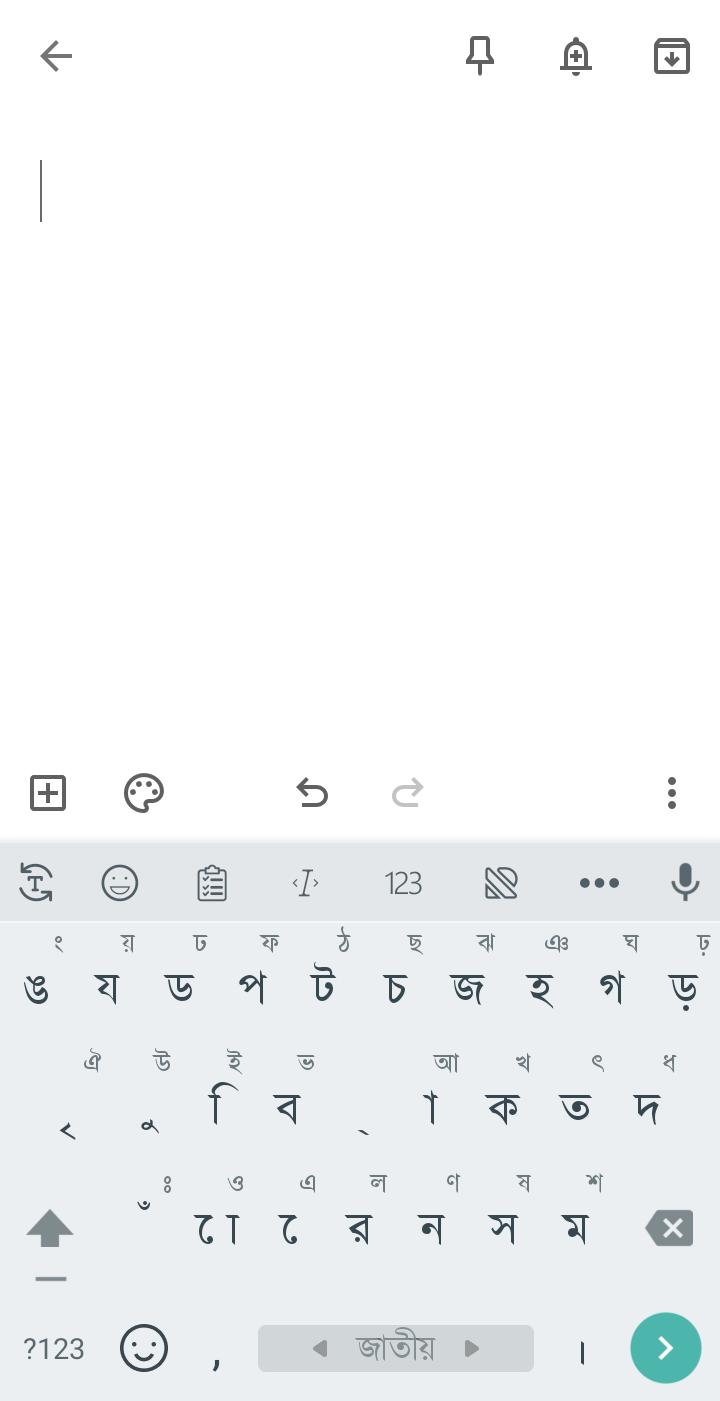
Ridmik keyboard layout

Ridmik Keyboard (Bengali: রিদ্মিক কীবোর্ড) is the input system available for Android and iOS. Users can type in Bengali with Avro Phonetic, Probhat, National and as well as English layouts. It also comes with many Emojis and background themes and includes shortcuts and speech-to-text support using Google STT backend.

=== Gboard ===
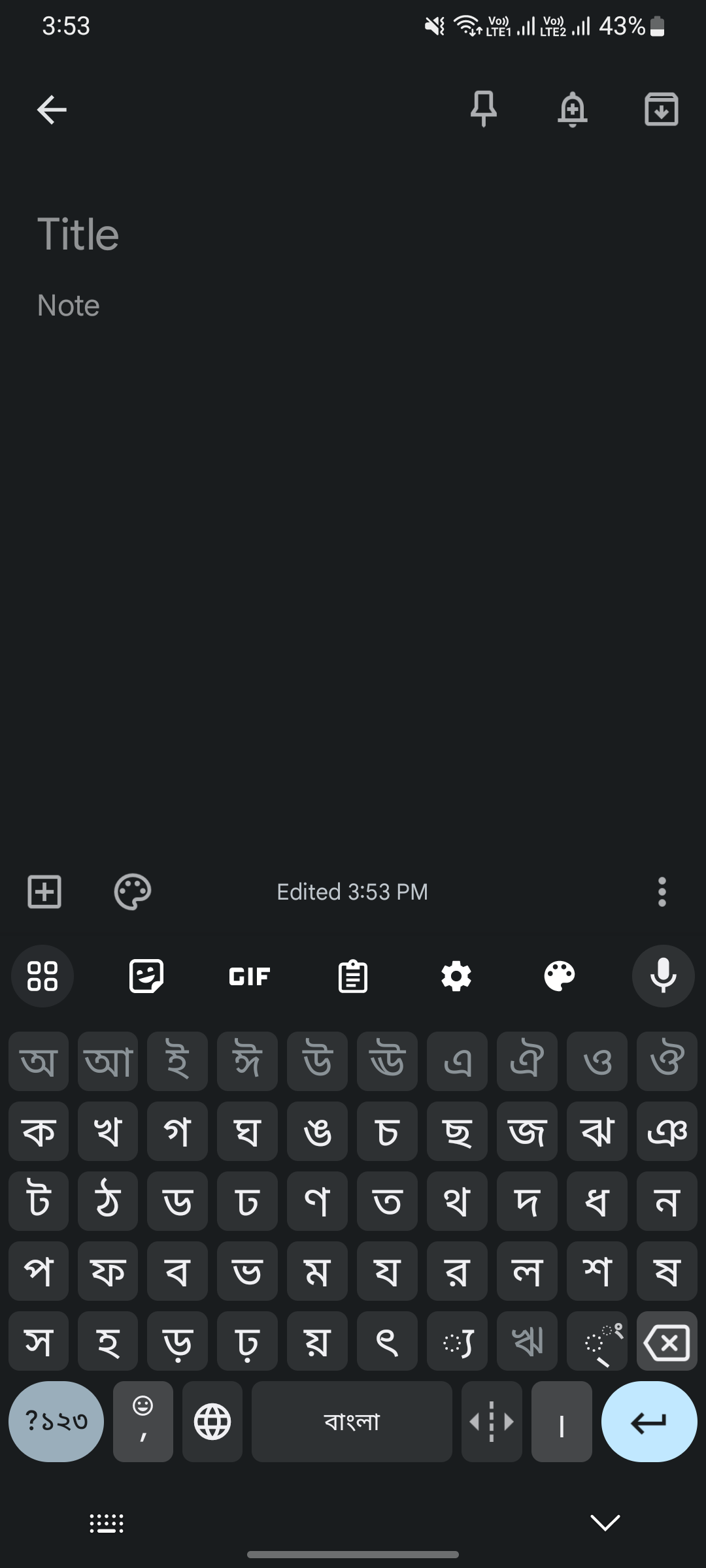
Gboard Bangla (Bangladesh) Layout on a Samsung device

Gboard is a virtual keyboard app developed by Google for Android and iOS devices. It supports several South Asian languages, including Bengali. It offers a handwriting input method, voice typing and a Latin letter transliteration layout, as well as a traditional Bengali keyboard. It also supports GIF suggestions, options for a dark color theme or adding a personal image as the keyboard background, support for voice dictation, next-phrase prediction, and hand-drawn emoji recognition.

=== WM Keyboard ===
WM Keyboard

WM Keyboard is a multilingual input method editor for Android, developed by Arian Mollik Wasi, an independent developer based in Bangladesh. It is free and open-source software released under the MIT License, with its source code available on GitHub. The application supports Bangla phonetic typing compatible with Avro Keyboard, as well as several other Bangla keyboard layouts, including Probhat, Jatiya and Khipro. It also supports multilingual typing, word prediction, autocorrection, glide typing and emoji search. Most typing features, including prediction, transliteration and learning, operate locally on the device, without requiring an internet connection. The application is available for Android devices and is designed with an emphasis on privacy and offline functionality.

=== Borno Keyboard ===
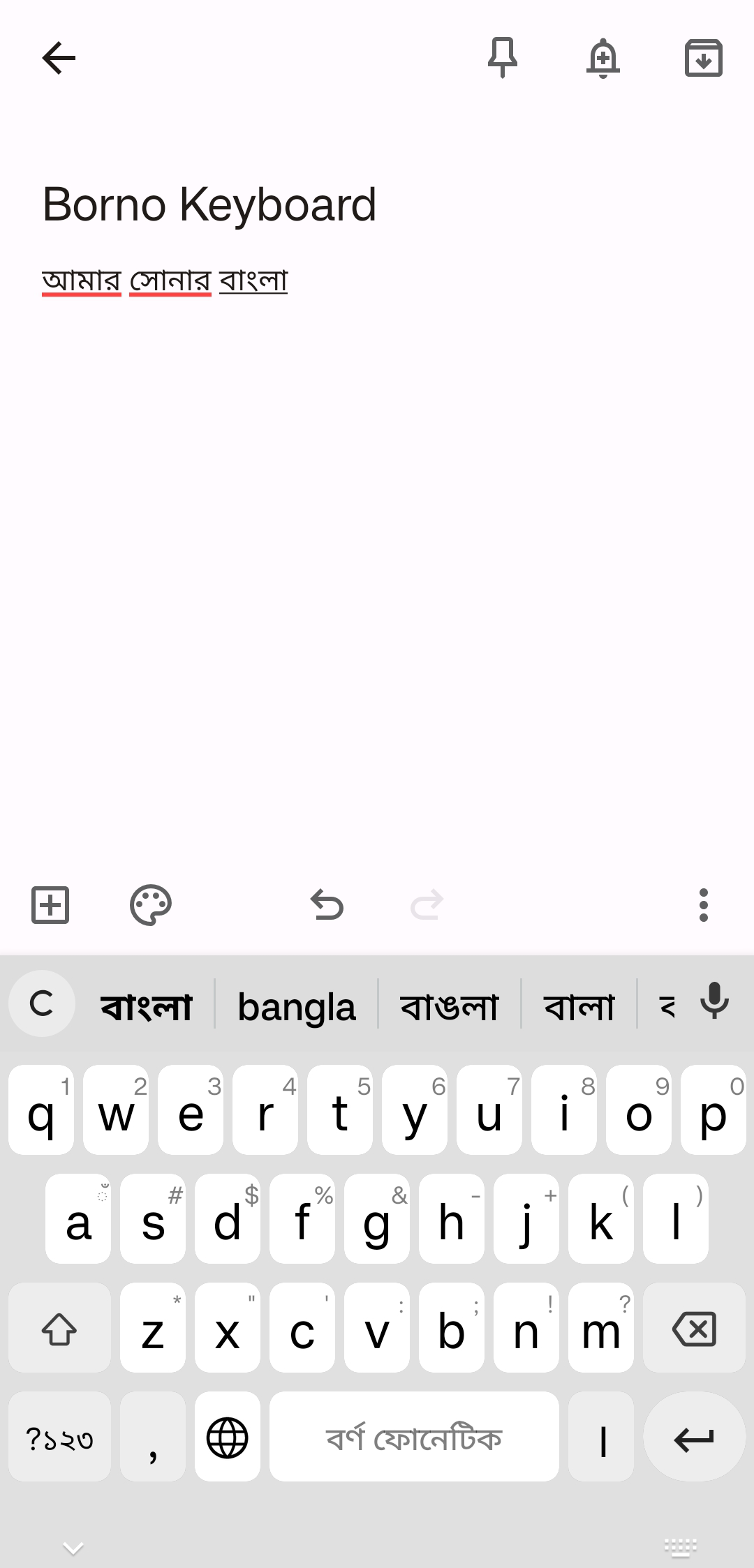
Borno Keyboard

Borno (Bengali: বর্ণ, lit. 'Letter') is a Bangla input method editor for Android, maintained and developed by Codepotro. Even though its Android version is proprietary software, a free software version exists, known as Borno Lite, but available only for Windows. It has nine different Bangla keyboard layouts including Borno Phonetic, which is a phonetic keyboard layout like Avro. It is still under development.

=== OpenBoard ===
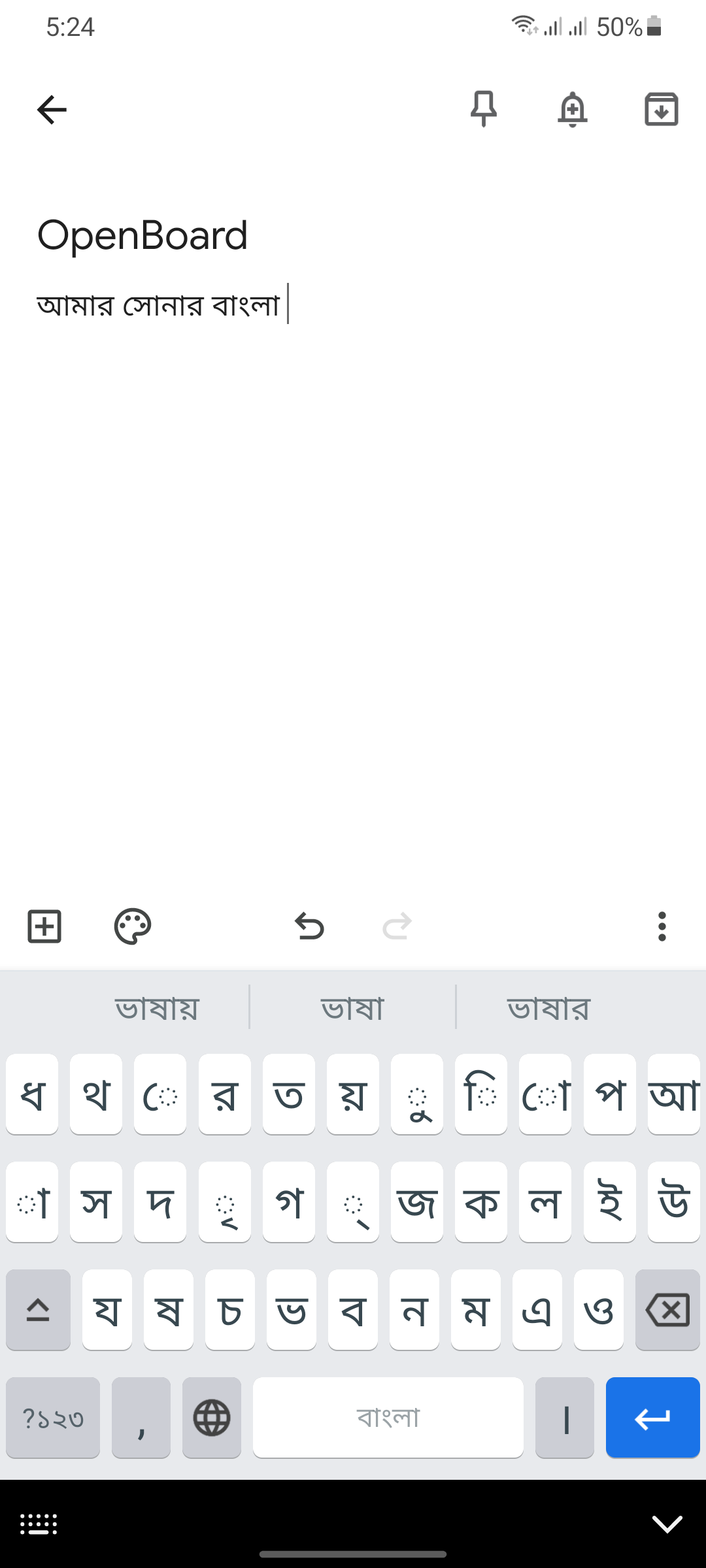
OpenBoard Bengali Akkhor Layout on a Samsung Device

OpenBoard is a free and open-source keyboard based on AOSP, which includes Bengali layouts. It comes with three Bengali Fixed Layouts including Akkhor Layout. OpenBoard is a privacy-focused keyboard that does not contain shortcuts to any Google apps, has no communication with Google servers. It supports auto correction, word suggestion for the Bengali language.

=== Indic Keyboard ===
Indic Keyboard is a free and open-source keyboard software for Android developed by Indic Project, available under Apache License. It supports common Bengali layouts, namely Probhat, Avro and Inscript.

=== Bijoy ===
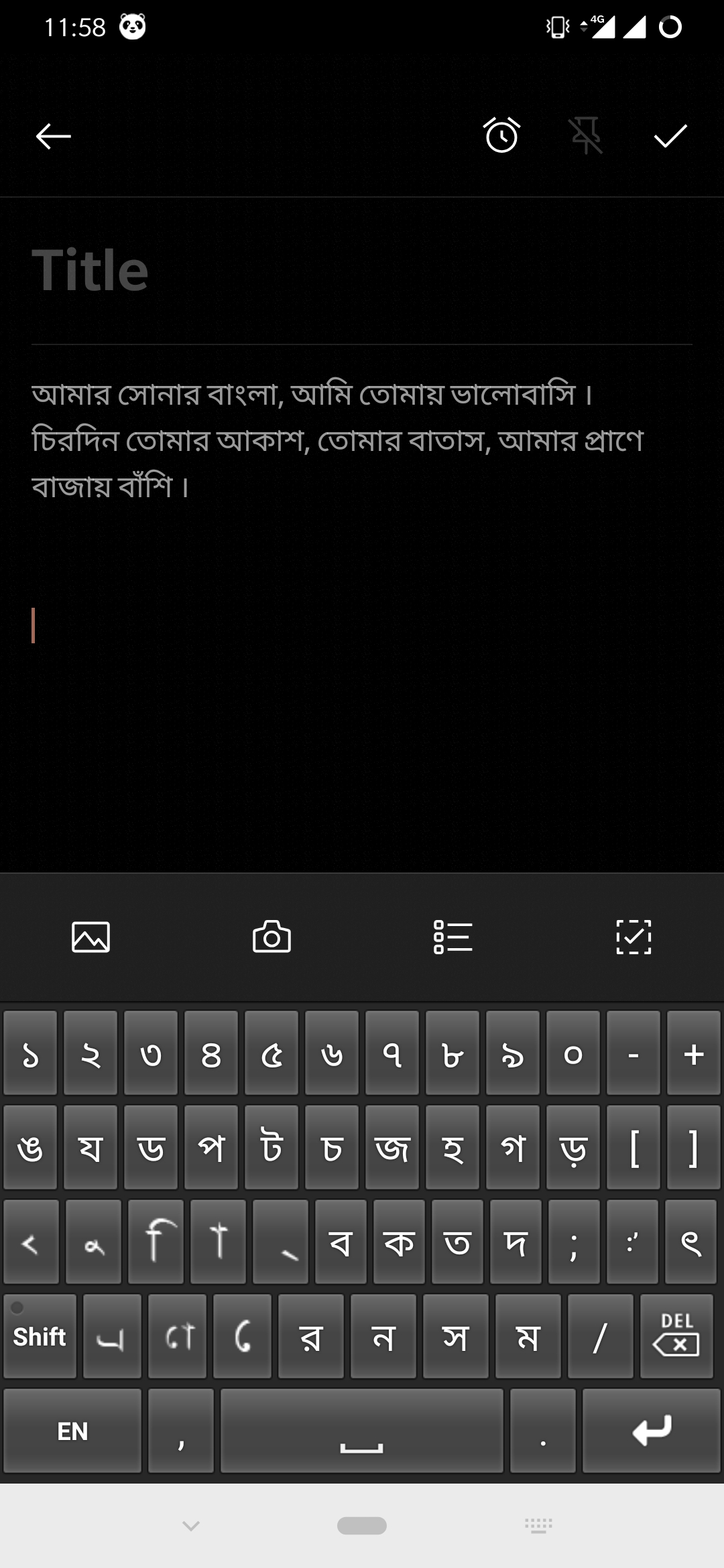
Bijoy Keyboard (old) on OnePlus 6T

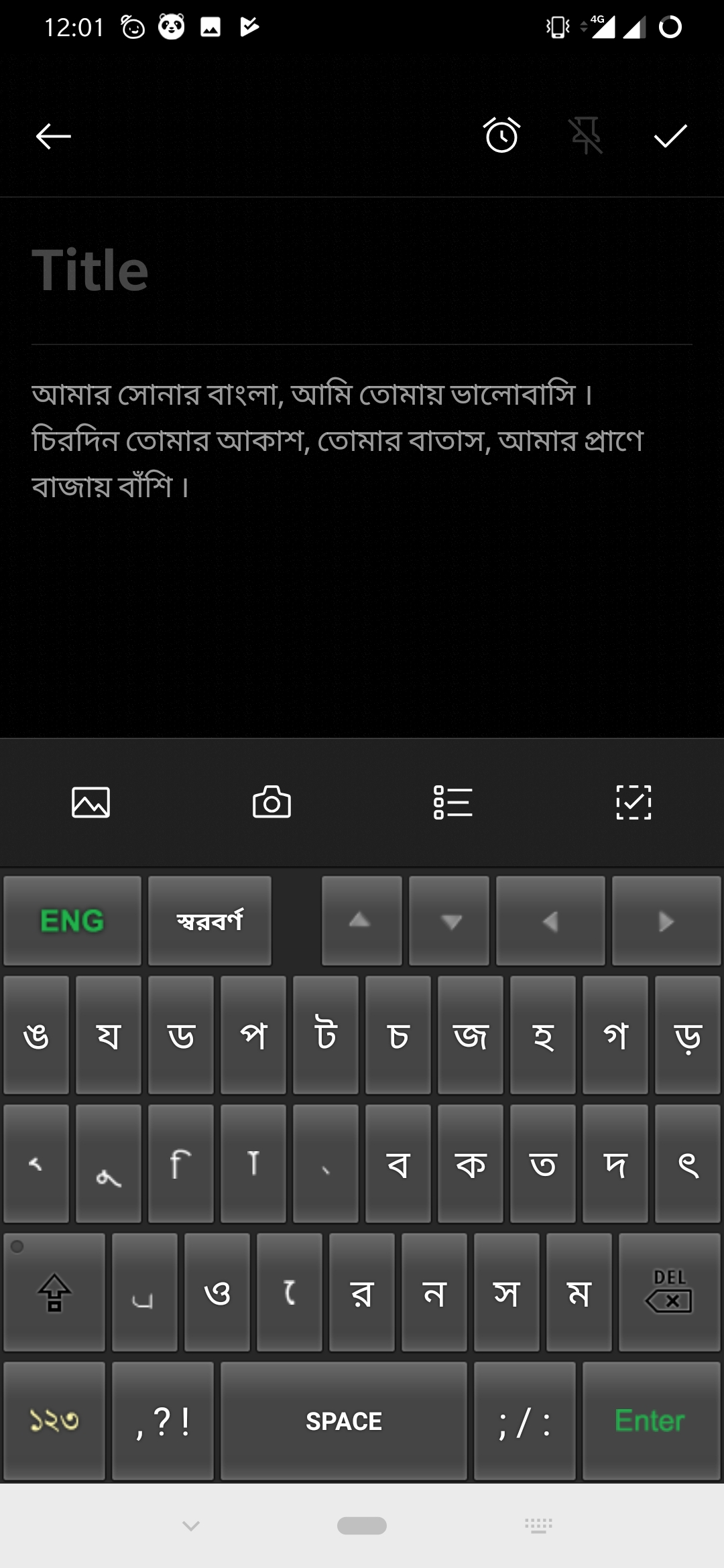
Bijoy Bangla (new) on OnePlus 6T

Bijoy Keyboard or Bijoy Bangla (Bengali: বিজয় বাংলা, lit. 'Victory Bangla') is a mobile keyboard for Android and iOS. In 2015, it was re-released as Bijoy Bangla only for Android. Bijoy Bangla is for writing Bangla in Unicode System with a Bijoy Keyboard. It uses the Bijoy layout, which is almost the same as the Jatiyo layout.

=== Parboti ===
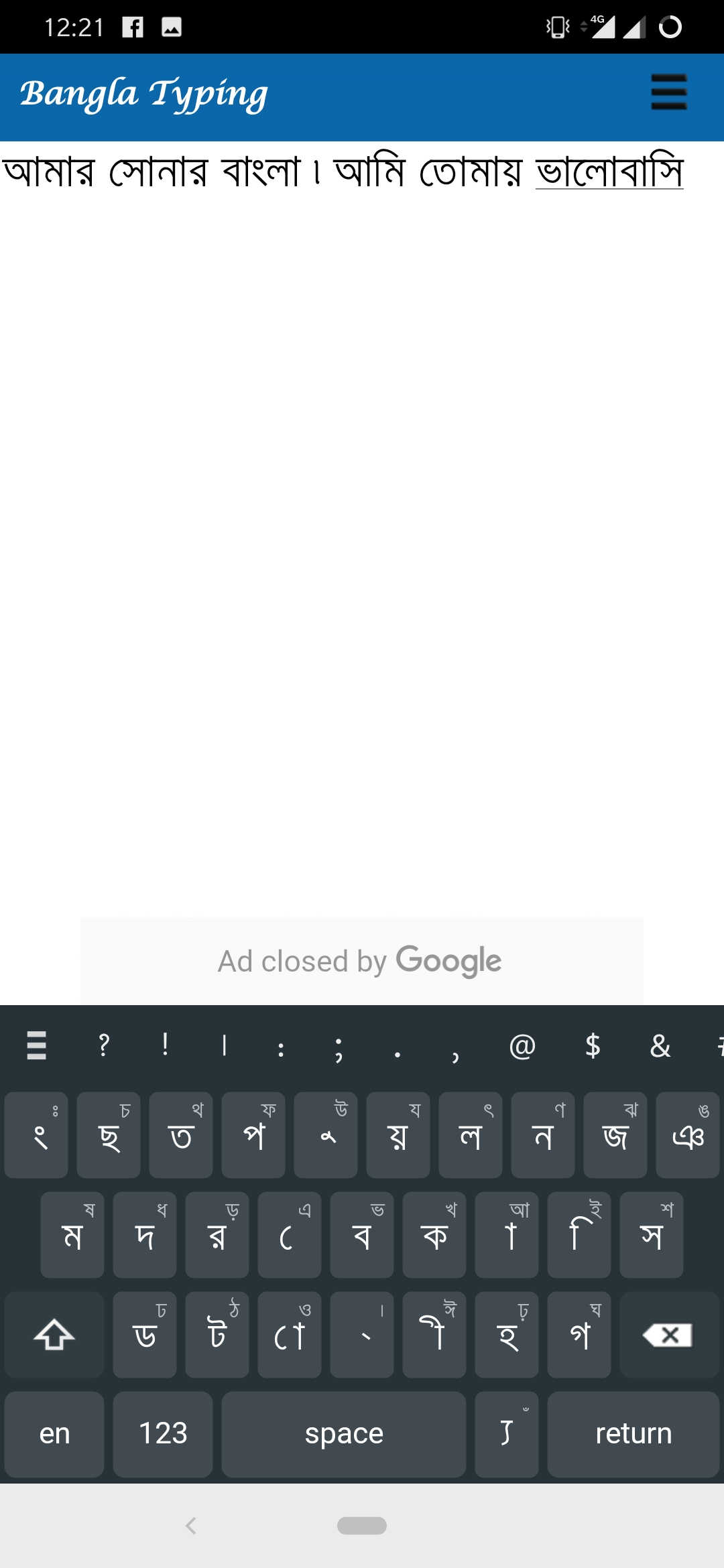
Parboti Bangla Keyboard on OnePlus 6T

In Parboti Keyboard (Bengali: পার্বতী কীবোর্ড) users can type in Bengali and English using this keyboard. Users can also edit fixed layout by their own choice.

=== Mayabi ===
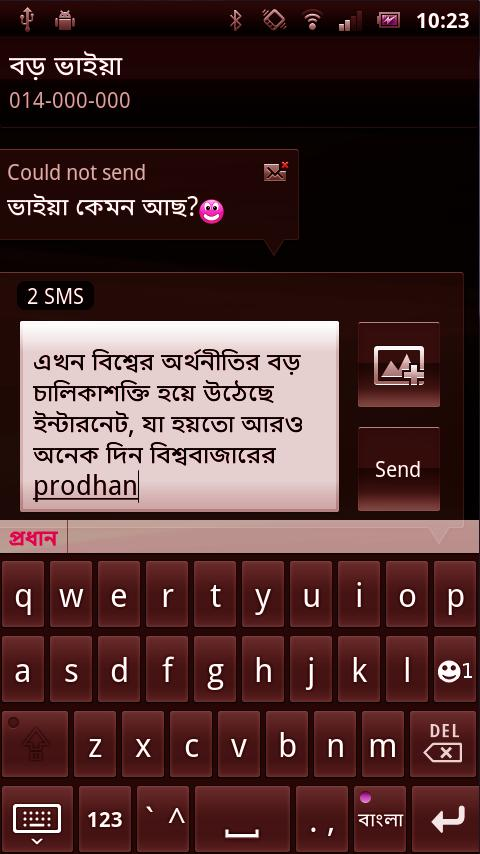
Mayabi Bengali keyboard, beta

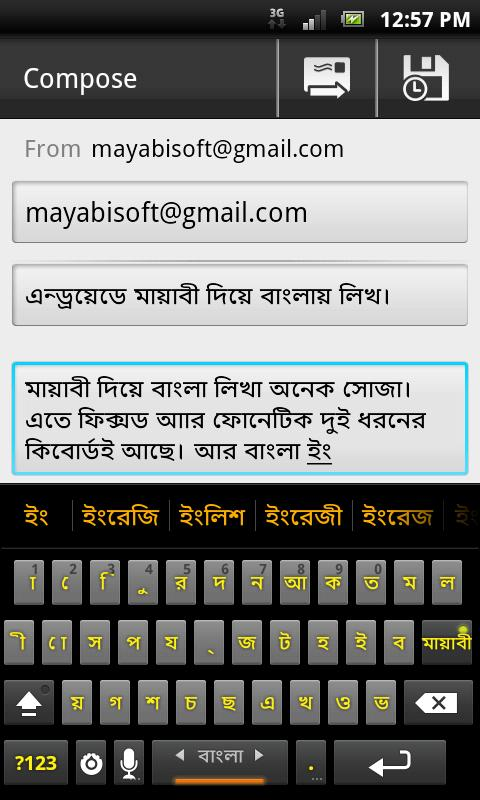
Mayabi keyboard v1.1

Mayabi Bangla Keyboard (Bengali: মায়াবী কীবোর্ড, lit. 'Mystical keyboard') is an on-screen Bengali soft keyboard for Android platform. Bengali word dictionary included with the keyboard as well for word prediction.

== See also ==
- Japanese input methods
