= Wikimedia Bangladesh =

Bangladeshi non-profit charitable organization

Wikimedia Bangladesh Foundation
- উইকিমিডিয়া বাংলাদেশ ফাউন্ডেশন
- Abbreviation: WikimediaBD
- Formation: 3 October 2011; 14 years ago
- Founder: Wikimedia community
- Founded at: Dhaka, Bangladesh
- Type: Non-profit organization
- Registration no.: S-11906
- Legal status: Active
- Location: Dhaka, Bangladesh
- Coordinates: 23.740117°N 90.3875823°E
- Region served: Bangladesh
- Methods: Bengali Wikipedia, Bishnupriya Manipuri Wikipedia, Santali Wikipedia, Bengali Wiktionary, Bengali Wikiquote, Bengali Wikibooks, Bengali Wikisource, Bengali Wikivoyage
- President: Tanvir Rahman
- Key people: Md. Delwar Hossain (General Secretary); Shakil Hosen (Treasurer)
- Subsidiaries: regional communities
- Affiliations: Wikimedia Foundation
- Volunteers: 71 (as of August 2019) (2019)
- Website: wikimedia.org.bd bd.wikimedia.org

Wikimedia Bangladesh Foundation (mostly known as Wikimedia Bangladesh or WikimediaBD) is a registered charity established to support volunteers in Bangladesh who work on Wikimedia projects such as Wikipedia. It is a Wikimedia chapter approved by the Wikimedia Foundation which owns and hosts those projects. As of 19 November 2019, it is the only official Wikimedia chapter in South Asia and the only chapter that operates in a Bengali-speaking environment.

The chapter has several collaborations with other institutions and has organised events for volunteers aimed at adding content to Foundation projects.

== History ==
Wikimedia Bangladesh was approved by Wikimedia Board of trustees on 3 October 2011, and was the 39th local chapter to be approved by the Wikimedia Foundation board. In May 2012, the organization applied to Registrar of Joint Stock Companies And Firms for local registration. It was registered locally on 9 June 2014 under the Societies Registration Act of Bangladesh and its official name is Wikimedia Bangladesh Foundation.

== Board of trustees ==
As of 2026, the Board members comprises:

- Tanvir Rahman (President)
- Md. Delwar Hossain (General Secretary)
- Shakil Hosen (Treasurer)
- Moheen Reeyad (member)
- Shabab Mustafa (member)
- Subrata Roy (member)
- Dolon Prova (member)
- Mayeenul Islam (member)
- Tanbin Islam Siyam (member)

== Activities ==
Wikimedia Bangladesh runs various voluntary education programs such as workshops, photo contests, article contests and conferences in Bangladesh to promote and enrich the Wikimedia Foundation projects. While Bengali language projects (such as Bengali Wikipedia) are the priority, it also helped with the launching of other regional language version of Wikipedia such as Santali Wikipedia and Bishnupriya Manipuri Wikipedia.

The organization also collaborates with other organizations and institutions such as Bangladesh National Museum, the Embassy of Sweden in Dhaka, Grameenphone for the enrichment of the Wikipedia project. When video piracy started in Bangladesh by using Wikipedia Zero in 2016, it worked jointly with the Wikimedia Foundation to raise awareness among the users. In 2017, Bangladesh Air Force release their photos to Wikimedia Commons, and in 2019, Jago FM provides photographs of media personalities for the same purpose.

== See also ==
- List of Wikimedia chapters
