= Shabab Mustafa =

Bangladeshi Wikimedian and President of Wikimedia Bangladesh

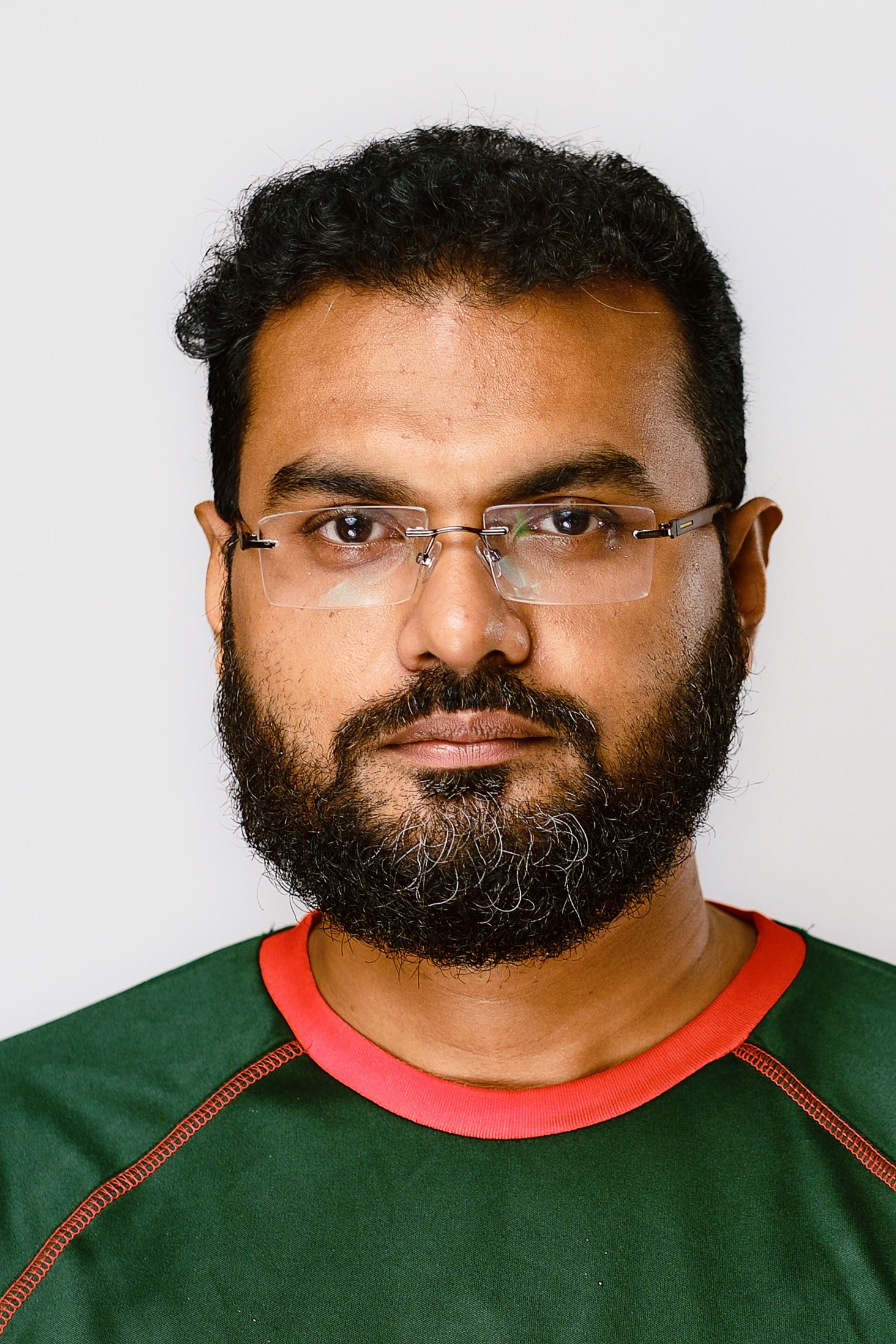
- Shabab Mustafa in 2022
- Born: 21 July 1986 (age 40)
- Education: Bachelor's degree, Business Studies
- Alma mater: Dhanmondi Government Boys' High School; Dhaka City College; Bangladesh Open University
- Occupation: Web Developer
- Known for: Contributions to Avro Keyboard
- Spouse: Jennifer Alam
- Parents: Mohammad Mustafa (father); Kazi Rokeya Begum (mother)
- Awards: Ekushey Padak (2025)
- Website: shabab.me

Shabab Mustafa (Bengali: শাবাব মুস্তাফা) (born 21 July 1986) is a Bangladeshi web developer and an executive member of Wikimedia Bangladesh. In 2025, he, along with Mehdi Hasan Khan's Avro team, received the Ekushey Padak in the field of science and technology for their Collective Contribution.

== Early life ==
Shabab Mustafa was born on July 21, 1986. He studied at Dhanmondi Government Boys' High School and Dhaka City College. Later, he completed his graduation in business studies.

== Career ==
Shabab Mustafa began his career as an accounting teacher. Later, he transitioned into the technology sector and is currently working professionally as a web developer.

== Volunteer Work ==
=== Avro ===
Shabab Mustafa served as a moderator of the support forum for the Avro Keyboard, where he listened to users' issues and worked on resolving them. Additionally, he played an important role in integrating the Probhat and Munir Optima keyboard layouts.

=== Wikimedia ===
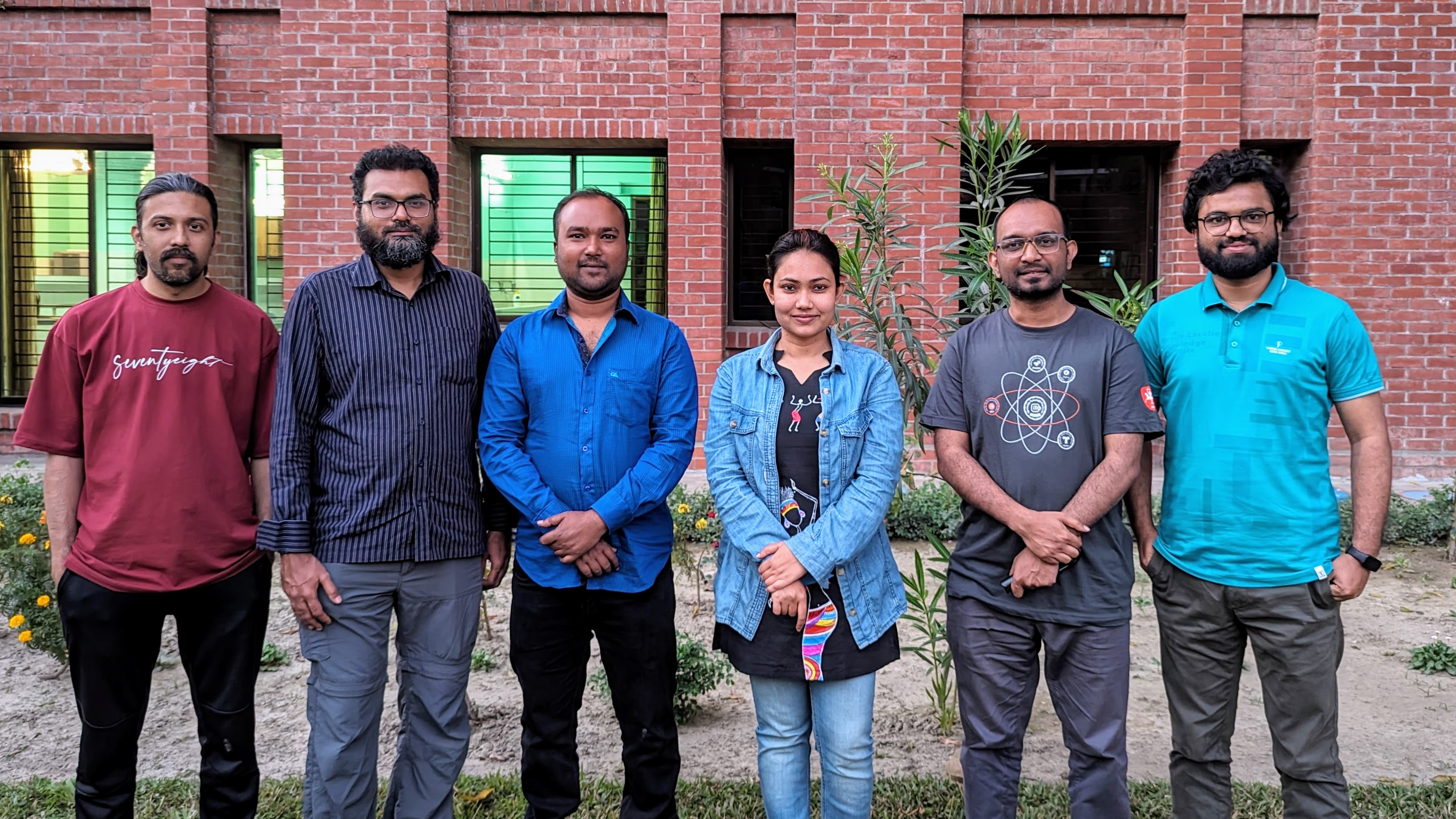
Shabab Mustafa (second from left) at the Executive Committee meeting of Wikimedia Bangladesh on March 9, 2024

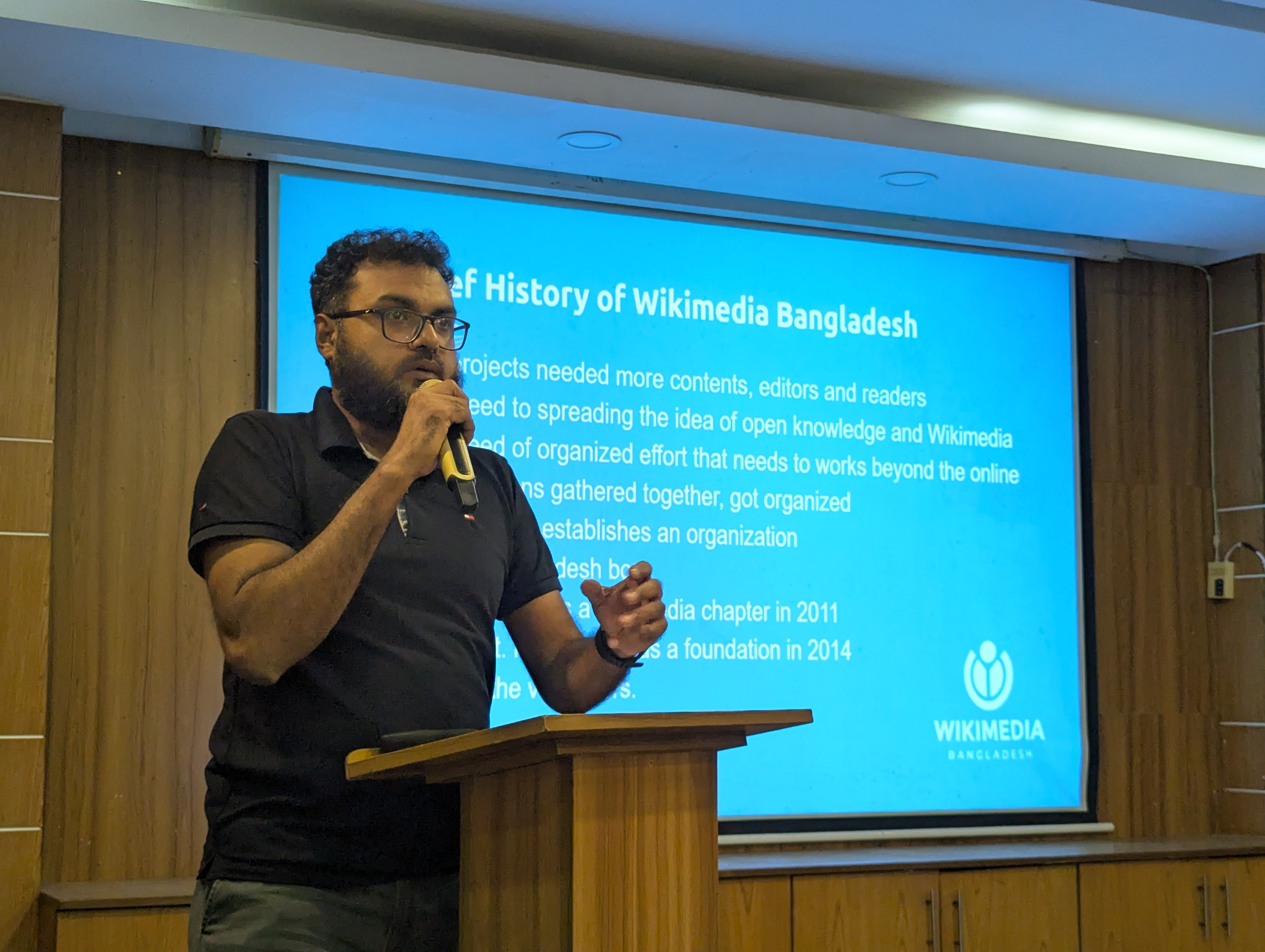
Shabab delivering a speech about Wikimedia Bangladesh at the Wiki Leaders Training 2025, held in Cox’s Bazar, Bangladesh.

He is a founding member of Wikimedia Bangladesh and has served on several committees and subcommittees of the global Wikimedia movement. Alongside promoting Bengali computing, he has also been a leader in the Linux community in Bangladesh. Additionally, he served six terms as an executive committee member of Wikimedia Bangladesh from 2012 to 2023 and held the position of president during the terms 2018–19, 2022–23, and 2024–25.

=== Other Activities ===
Shabab Mustafa is the founding moderator of the Bengali-language technology forum "Amader Projukti Forum." He also served as the former country contact for Ubuntu Bangladesh. Furthermore, he has been a member of the Bangladesh Linux Users Alliance and a former ardentier of the Quantum Foundation.

== Awards and recognition ==
In 2025, Shabab Mustafa was awarded the Ekushey Padakin the science and technology category along with Mehdi Hasan Khan, Rifat Nabi, and Tanbin Islam Siam for their contribution to the Avro Keyboard.
