= Odia Wikipedia =

Odia-language edition of Wikipedia

- Odia Wikipedia logo
- Screenshot
- Website type: Internet encyclopedia project
- Available in: Odia
- Owner: Wikimedia Foundation
- Creator: Odia wiki community
- Website: or.wikipedia.org
- Commercial: Charitable
- Registration: Optional
- Launched: June 2002; 24 years ago
- Current status: Online
- Content license: Creative Commons Attribution/ Share-Alike 4.0 (most text also dual-licensed under GFDL); Media licensing varies

The Odia Wikipedia (Odia: ଓଡ଼ିଆ ଉଇକିପିଡ଼ିଆ, romanized: Odia Uikipidia) (also known as Oriya Wikipedia and orwiki) is the Odia edition of Wikipedia. It is a free, web-based, collaborative encyclopedia project supported by the non-profit Wikimedia Foundation. The project was started by Suneet Samaetha in June 2002 and reached 1,000 articles in May 2011. This is one of the first four Indic Wikipedias started in 2002, among over 20 Indic language Wikipedias. The first edit on Odia Wikipedia occurred on 3 June 2002.

== Growth, coverage and popularity ==
Started in June 2002, it reached one thousand articles in May 2011. As of 19 September 2026, it has 21,055 articles, the 139th on the list of Wikipedias according to article count. Odia Wikipedians have organized meetups and workshops in seven different cities like Bhubaneswar, Cuttack, Anugul, Balasore, Bangalore and New Delhi across India. The readership has increased over 300% in the last six months. The page views per month is at 4.38 million. This Wikipedia ranks 134 among the 289 world language Wikipedias, as of 23 August 2015.

== Statistics ==
The table below contains details of the official Wikipedia statistics under the auspices of the Wikimedia Foundation for Odia language; the given information is the current numbers. Test Wikipedias are listed at the Wikimedia Incubator Wiki project.

Sl No.	Language	Language (local)	Wiki	Articles	Total	Edits	Admins	Users	Active users	Images	Depth
175	Odia	ଓଡ଼ିଆ	or	2,449	15,252	81,640	4	3,346	63	27	146

The table below contains a details sorted by the number of edits per article.

Sl No.	Language	Language (local)	Wiki	Edits / article	Total / article	Users / article	Articles	Edits	Total	Users
48	Odia	ଓଡ଼ିଆ	or	12.78	1.40	0.20	528	6 749	739	108

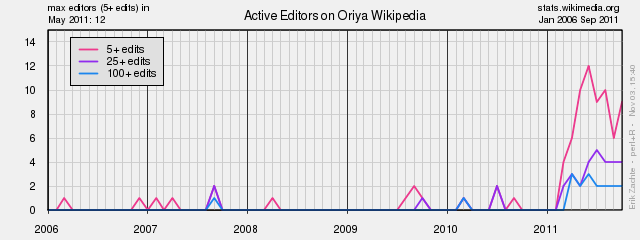
Statistics of Odia Wikipedia's active users

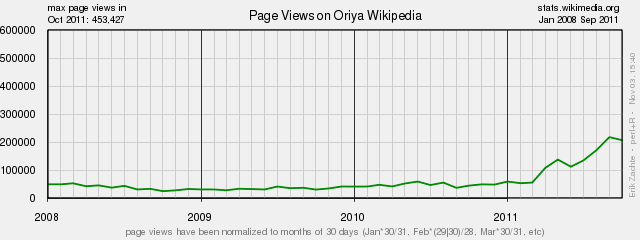
Page views of Odia Wikipedia

Wikipedia Report Card: summaries for Odia

Details	Data	Yearly change	Monthly change
Page views per month	484,698	--	--
Article count	1,642	+154%	+7%
New articles per day	4	--	--
Edits per month	1,780	+64%	+9%
Active editors	9	--	+50%
Very active editors	2	--	+0%
New editors	1	--	--
Speakers	31,000,000	--	--
Editors per million speakers	0.3	--	--

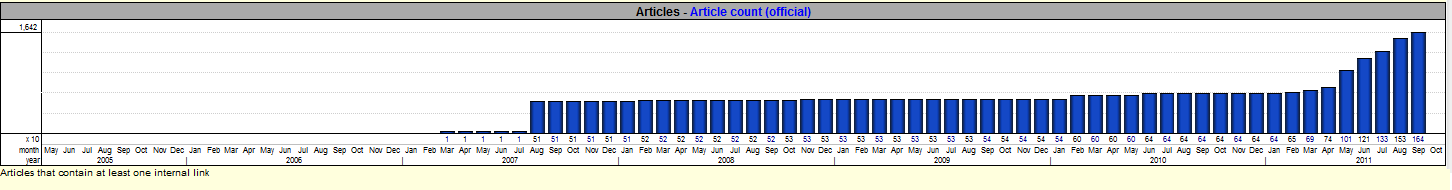
Article count stats of Wikipedia, contains articles that contain at least one internal link
