= Bangladesh Computer Council =

Computer council in Bangladesh

Coordinates: 23°46′44″N 90°22′28″E

- বাংলাদেশ কম্পিউটার কাউন্সিল
- Seal of Bangladesh Computer Council
- Formation: 1983
- Type: Autonomous government body
- Headquarters: Dhaka, Bangladesh
- Location: Agargaon, Dhaka-1207
- Region served: Bangladesh
- Official language: Bengali
- Website: bcc.gov.bd

The Bangladesh Computer Council (BCC) is a statutory government organization operating under the Information and Communication Technology Division of the Ministry of Posts, Telecommunications and Information Technology of the government of Bangladesh. It was established by the parliament under Act No IX of 1990. The BCC's headquarters are situated in Agargaon, Dhaka, Bangladesh.

The primary mission of the Bangladesh Computer Council is to promote and support activities related to information and communication technology (ICT). This includes formulating national ICT strategies and policies, creating standards and specifications for ICT tools used by government organizations, and working towards the development of human resources in the ICT sector.

The Bangladesh Computer Council operates a tier III certified national data center in Bangladesh. This data center provides secure and reliable storage and management of digital data for various government agencies and other organizations in the country.

The ICT Division of Bangladesh Computer Council is building a tier IV (most reliable) National Data Center (4TDC) at Bangabandhu Hi-Tech City, Kaliakoir, Gazipur District, with the help of the Chinese government. This data center will be equipped with cloud computing and G-cloud (e-Governance through cloud computing) technology.

== History ==
The Bangladeshi government established the National Computer Committee (NCC) in 1983. However, in 1988, the NCC was dissolved and replaced by the National Computer Board (NCB). Later on, the Bangladesh Computer Council Ordinance was passed by Act No IX of 1990, which was approved by parliament in 1990. This ordinance transformed the National Computer Board into a statutory body called the Bangladesh Computer Council (BCC). BCC continued to function under the President's Secretariat until 1991. In 1991, the BCC was placed under the Ministry of Science and Technology, which later became the Ministry of Science and Information and Communication Technology. In 2011, the BCC was placed under the newly created Information and Communication Technology Division of the Ministry of Posts, Telecommunications and Information Technology of the government of Bangladesh.

The 5th National Girls Programming Competition 2021 was jointly organized by the Bangladesh Computer Council, the Information and Communication Technology Division, and the Department of Computer Science and Engineering at Daffodil International University. One hundred and twenty-five teams of female students from 49 Bangladeshi universities participated.

The fourth Bangladesh Robot Olympiad 2021 was organized in collaboration with the Bangladesh Computer Council, the Information and Communication Technology Division, Dhaka University's Department of Robotics and Mechanical Engineering, and the Bangladesh Open Source Network.

== Activities and services ==
=== Testing and quality assurance ===
In July 2018, a Software Quality Testing and Certification Centre was inaugurated in the Information and Communication Technology Division. Initially, it tested software and hardware purchased by the government. According to the Bangladesh Computer Council's website, software quality assurance and testing is a service it provides through the center.

=== Standards development ===
BCC is entrusted with developing standards that helps accessibility of the Bengali language in the field of information technology. The responsibility of promulgating these standards lies with the Bangladesh Standards and Testing Institution (BSTI), while the task of technical drafting and declaration is carried out by the BCC. The organization has already developed several standards and simultaneously modernized the existing ones. Bangladesh Standards are:

- Bangladesh Standard Specification for Bangla Coded Character Set for Information Interchange (Third Revision) (BDS 1520:2018): It defines the character encoding scheme for the Bangla script, facilitating information exchange and compatibility across various computer systems and applications in Bangladesh. This specification ensures seamless communication and data sharing, promotes the development of localized software and content in the Bengali language, and ultimately enhances accessibility and inclusivity for the Bengali-speaking population in the digital realm.
- Bangladesh Standard Specification for Computer Bangla Keyboard (First Revision) (BDS 1738:2018): This standard outlines the standardized requirements for keyboards specifically designed to input the Bengali script into computer systems. Introduced in 2018, this standard ensures uniformity and compatibility among computer Bengali keyboards, facilitating efficient and accurate typing of Bengali characters. BDS 1738 defines the layout, key arrangement, and functional characteristics of the keyboard, ensuring it meets the needs and preferences of Bangla language users in Bangladesh.
- Bangladesh Standard Codes for Information Interchange (BDS 1934:2018): To ensure compatibility and consistency in data exchange across various computer systems and applications within the country, there is a need for a national standard for ASCII-based Bengali character and symbol coding. The Bangladesh Computer Council has addressed this need by drafting the Bangladesh Standard Code for Information Interchange (BSCII). This code was created by reviewing popular Bengali language software based on ASCII in Bangladesh, and it includes a total of 210 Bengali letters, symbols, and compound letters. Its purpose is to define the character encoding system used for the interchange of information.

Due to lack of coherence and synergy between vendors and technologists, these standards were largely never widely accepted nor recognized by international bodies. Later, versions of standards such as BSCII in essence rubber stamped Unicode encoding scheme.

An official order to mandatorily install a keyboard layout package kit in 2018 spawned furor over multiple fronts.
