= Bangladesh Association of Software and Information Services =

Bangladesh Association of Software and Information Services (BASIS)
- Abbreviation: BASIS
- Established: 1998
- Type: National association of the software and information services companies
- Headquarters: BDBL Bhaban (17th Floor), 12 Kawran Bazar, Dhaka 1215, Bangladesh
- Location: Dhaka, Bangladesh
- Coordinates: 23.7508383°N 90.3908398°E
- Administrator: Abul Khair Mohammad Hafizullah Khan (Joint Secretary)
- Website: basis.org.bd

Bangladesh Association of Software and Information Services (BASIS) is the national association of Software and information and communication technologies companies in Bangladesh.

== History ==
Bangladesh Association of Software and Information Services (BASIS) was established in 1998.

In June 2016, Mustafa Jabar was elected president of BASIS after his Digital Brigade Panel won seven of the nine directorships. The elections at this point were held triennially.

On 27 March 2018, it was reported that the Bangladesh government had repealed the election of BASIS, which had been scheduled for 31 March. The move extended the tenure for six months of BASIS's executive committee. Syed Almas Kabir was later elected president on 31 March 2018, when the elections were held anyway upon request of the commerce ministry.

In April 2018, BASIS started the Commonwealth-SheTrades initiative, with funding from the UK Department for International Development. In May 2018, the BASIS website was hacked by a Myanmar hacking group. According to Al Jazeera in 2018, BASIS is "the biggest umbrella organization representing the country's IT sector." BASIS has offices in Dhaka.

In August 2018, BASIS publicly implored RAJUK to allow BASIS members operating software companies out of commercial zones to continue operating, noting that the commercial zones then open did not allow such companies to remain open all day. BASIS at the time said that 800 of its 1,100 members had offices in non-commercial areas.

== BASIS Outsourcing Award ==
The BASIS Outsourcing Award recognizes the outstanding performance of organizations and individuals in the field of outsourcing software and ITES services. In 2011, BASIS created the award. The program identifies the best performers in the outsourcing industry/community.

== ICT Award ==
In July 2017, BASIS created the National ICT Awards. In July 2018, BASIS launched the second national ICT award.
