= List of encyclopedias in Hungarian =

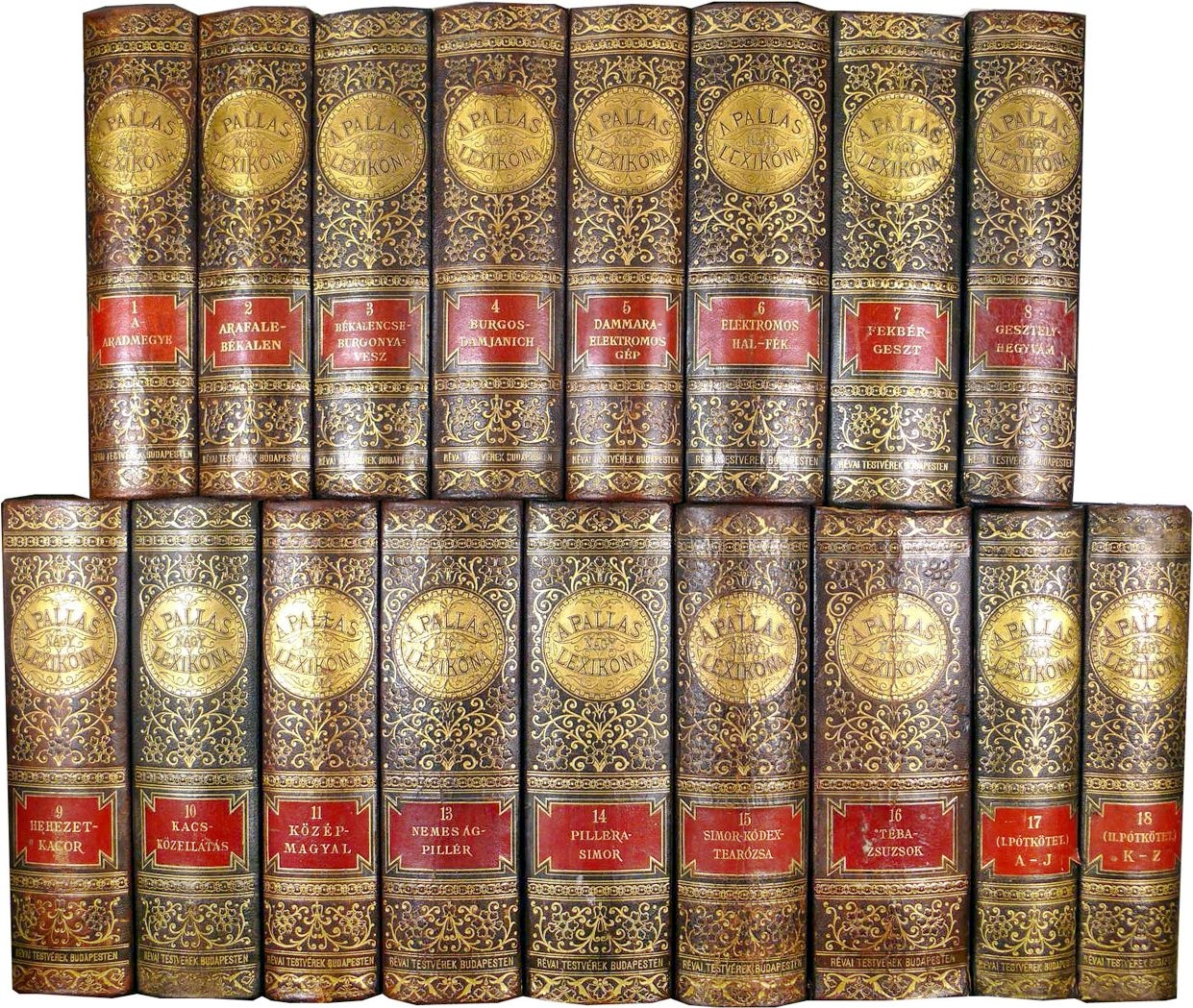
Ornate volumes of the Pallas lexicon (1893–1900)

The following list attempts to collect the major encyclopedias written in Hungarian, either independently or in reverse chronological order. (A number of alphabetical collections have been published as encyclopedias, and these are also included in this article.) Although most encyclopedias are published alphabetically, some biographical collections use chronological order, and church hagiographic biographies (Lives of Saints) now often present biographies in the order of individual days of the calendar year. The following tables do not include non-alphabetical (thematic) Hungarian encyclopedias. (→ List of thematic encyclopedias in Hungarian)

== Latin old lexicons in Hungary (17th–19th century) / Magyarországi régi latin lexikonok (17–19. század) ==
- List of old Latin lexicons in Hungary

== Hungarian general lexicons, hand lexicons / Magyar általános nagylexikonok, kézi lexikonok ==
Author, editor	Title	Place of publication, publisher	Release year	Electronic contact
[editor not listed]	Treasury of Public Knowledge (Közhasznú Esmeretek Tára)	Pest, Wigand Ottó	1831–1834	REAL-EOD
[editor not listed]	Youth Knowledge (Ifjúsági ismeretek)	Vienna	1840	
Antal Vállas	National Encyclopaedia (Nemzeti encyclopaedia)	Pest, Hartleben K. A.	1845–1848	
[editor not listed]	Treasury of Modern Knowledge (Ujabb kori ismeretek tára)	Pest, Gusztáv Heckenast	1850–1855	
[editor not listed]	A Repository of Modern Knowledge (Ismerettár)	Pest, Gusztáv Heckenast	1858–1864	Google Books
János Török – János Pollák – Ferenc Laubhaimer (eds.)	Universal Hungarian encyclopaedia (Egyetemes magyar encyclopaedia)	Pest, Szent István Társulat	1859–1876	MDZ
Ede Somogyi (ed.)	Hungarian Lexicon (Magyar lexikon)	Budapest, various	1879–1885	ADT
Ignác Acsády (ed.)	Athenaeum Hand Lexicon (Az Athenaeum kézi lexikona)	Budapest, Athenaeum Rt.	1892–1893	MEK
Lajos Gerő (ed.)	Pallas Great Lexicon (A Pallas nagy lexikona)	Budapest, Pallas Irodalmi és Nyomdai Rt.	1893–1900	MEK
Mór János Révai – Elemér Varjú (eds.)	Révai Great Lexicon (Révai Nagy Lexikona)	Budapest, Révai Testvérek	1911–1935	MEK
[editor not listed]	Franklin Hand Lexicon (A Franklin kézi lexikona)	Budapest, Franklin Irodalmi és Nyomdai Rt.	1912	ADT
Ödön Gerő (ed.)	World lexicon of Tolnai (Tolnai világlexikona)	Budapest, Tolnai Nyomdai Műintézet	1912–1919	ADT, just Vol 1-5
[editor not listed]	New world lexicon of Tolnai (Tolnai Új Világlexikona)	Budapest, Tolnai Nyomdai Műintézet	1926–1933	ADT
Gyula Kornis – Farkas Heller – Sándor Galamb – Antal Hekler – Viktor Papp – Imre Lukinich – Pál Teleki – Endre Gombocz – Géza Tóth – Zsigmond Ritoók – Jenő Pilch – Kornél Zelovich – Alajos Kovács (eds.)	Lexicon of the East (A Napkelet lexikona)	Budapest, Magyar Irodalmi Társaság	1927	
Géza Ágoston – József Balassa – Artur Bárdos – József Breit (eds.)	Gutenberg Great Lexicon (Gutenberg nagy lexikon)	Budapest, Stephaneum Nyomda Rt.	1931–1932	
[editor not listed]	Lexicon of New Times (The lexicon of Uj Idők)	Budapest, Singer és Wolfner Irodalmi Intézet Rt.	1935–1942	ADT
[editor not listed]	New Lexicon (Új lexikon)	Budapest, Dante Könyvkiadó – Pantheon Irodalmi Intézet	1936	ADT
[editor not listed]	Pesti Hírlap Lexicon (A Pesti Hírlap lexikona)	Budapest, Pesti Hírlap	1937	
Andor Berei (ed.)	New Hungarian Lexicon (Új magyar lexikon)	Budapest, Akadémiai Kiadó	1960–1981	
Károly Ákos (ed.)	Small Lexicon (Kislexikon)	Budapest, Akadémiai Kiadó	1968	
Mária Déva – Éva Papp – Gyöngyvér Márton – Judit Bodóné Nebella (eds.)	Hungarian Larousse: Encyclopedic Dictionary (Magyar Larousse: Enciklopédikus szótár)	Budapest, Akadémiai Kiadó	1991–1994	
David Drystal (ed.)	Cambridge Encyclopaedia (Cambridge enciklopédia)	Budapest, Maecenas Kiadó	1992	
László Bagossy (ed.)	Encyclopedia Hungarica (Encyclopedia Hungarica)	Calgary, Hungarian Ethnic Lexicon Foundation	1992–1998	
Éva Barabás – Csilla Siklódi – Éva Gyuris – László Faller (eds.)	Hungarian Great Lexicon (Magyar nagylexikon)	Budapest, Akadémiai Kiadó	1993–2004	
László Markó (ed.)	Officina Universal Lexicon (Officina egyetemes lexikon)	Budapest, Officina Nova	1994	
Zoltán Halász – Éva Árokszállási – János H. Székely – Gábor Hegedűs (eds.)	Britannica Hungarica World Encyclopaedia (Britannica Hungarica Világenciklopédia)	Budapest, Magyar Világ Kiadó Kft.	1994–2001	
István Kollega Tarsoly (chief ed.)	Révai New Lexicon (Révai új lexikona)	Szekszárd, Babits Kiadó	1996–2008	
Tibor Gellér – László Gyenge – Mária Kovács (eds.)	Novum General Illustrated Encyclopaedia (Novum általános képes enciklopédia)	Budapest, Novum Kiadó	2003	
Lászlóné Bárány – Sándor Rostás – Tamás Szlávik – Eszter Szegedi (eds.)	General Small Lexicon (Általános kislexikon)	Budapest, Magyar Nagylexikon Kiadó	2005	
Tamás Szlávik – Lászlóné Bárány – Sándor Rostás – Dóra Kruppa – Zsuzsanna Mód – Ferenc Ratkai – Violetta Réfiné Borczván – István Simon (eds.)	Everyone’s Lexicon (A–Z) (Mindenki lexikona (A–Z))	Budapest, Magyar Nagylexikon Kiadó	2007	

== Hungarian general small lexicons / Magyar általános kislexikonok ==
Author, editor	Title	Place of publication, for rent	Release time	Electronic contact
Wekerle László (ed.)	Small Lexicon (Kis lexikon) (2 volumes)	Budapest, Pallas Rt.	1886	
Ferenczi Zoltán (ed.)	Omniscient Small Lexicon (Mindentudó kis lexikon)	Budapest, Az „Universitas” kiadása	1913	
multiple authors	World Lexicon – University of Knowledge (Világlexikon – A tudás egyeteme)	Budapest, Enciklopédia Rt.	1925	
multiple authors	Small Lexicon – Explanation of 1000 Words (Kis lexikon – 1000 szó magyarázata)	Budapest, Vasárnapi Könyv	ca. 1927	
multiple authors	Modern Encyclopedia (Mai enciklopédia)	Liber kiadás	1930s	
Csánk Endre (ed.)	It is Good to Know – Modern Small Lexicon (Illik tudni – Modern kislexikon)	Budapest, Rózsavölgyi és Társa	1930s	MEK
multiple authors	Genius Small Lexicon (Genius kis lexikona)	Budapest, Genius Rt.	1930	
multiple authors	Révai Small Lexicon (Révai kis lexikona) (2 volumes)	Budapest, Révai Testvérek	1936	
Boldizsár Iván (ed.)	Small Lexicon of Great Times (Nagy idők kis lexikona)	Budapest, Franklin-Társulat	1942	
Kőhalmi Béla (ed.)	Family Small Lexicon of Radio Newspaper (A Rádió Ujság családi kis lexikona) (3 volumes)	Budapest, Rádió Ujság Lapvállalat Kft	1944	
Ákos Károly (ed.)	Small Lexicon A–Z (Kislexikon A–Z)	Budapest	1968	
multiple authors	Everyone's Lexicon (Mindenki lexikona) (2 volumes)	Budapest, Akadémiai Kiadó	1974	
multiple authors	Basic Knowledge Lexicon (Alapismereti lexikon)	Budapest, Tankönyvkiadó	1988	
multiple authors	Basic Knowledge Small Lexicon (Alapismereti kislexikon)	Budapest, Novotrade Rt.	1988	
multiple authors	Academic Small Lexicon (Akadémiai kislexikon) (2 volumes)	Budapest, Akadémiai Kiadó	1989–1990	
Csiffáry Tamás	General Small Lexicon A–Z (Általános kislexikon A-Z-ig)	Budapest, Könyvmíves Könyvkiadó	2004	
Csiffáry Tamás	Omniscient Lexicon (Mindentudó lexikon)	Budapest, Fix-term Kft.	2004	

== Hungarian general biographical lexicons / Magyar általános életrajzi lexikonok ==
Author, editor	Title	Place of publication, publisher	Release year	Electronic contact
Ézsaiás Budai	Old Scholars of the World (Régi tudós világ históriája)	Debrecen	1802	REAL-R
Vince Károly Kölesy – Jakab Melczer	National Plutarch (Nemzeti Plutarkus) (4 volumes)	Pest	1815–1816	Google Books I., III.
József Básthy	Memory of Hungarians and Their Allied Nations under One Government (Magyarok emléke, a velek rokon s azon egy kormány alatti nemzetekével)	Buda	1836	
Árpád Kerékgyártó	Biographies of Hungarians (Magyarok életrajzai) (7 issues)	Pest	1856–1859	Google Books
Ferenc Toldy	Hungarian Statesmen and Writers (Magyar államférfiak és irók) (2 volumes)	Pest	1866	
Mihály Zsilinszky	Hungarian Women – Historical Lives and Character Sketches (Magyar hölgyek. Történeti élet- és jellemrajzok)	Pest	1871	
Sándor Márki	Hungarian Pantheon (1884) (Magyar Pantheon)	Pozsony	1884	
Lajos Zólyomi – Ferenc Toldy	Hungarian Helicon (Magyar Helikon)	Pozsony	1884–1886	
Károly Szathmáry	Hungarian Pantheon (1893) (Magyar Pantheon)	Budapest	1893	
Vilmos Hankó	Old Hungarian Scholars and Inventors (Régi magyar tudósok és feltalálók)	Budapest	1905	
M. Emil Vitéz Kerkápoly	Hungarian Latest Era Lexicon – Book of Hungarian Revival 1919-1930 (A magyar legujabb kor lexikona. A magyar feltámadás könyve 1919-1930)	Budapest, Magyar Legujabb Kor Lexikona Kiadása	1930	
Géza Szentmiklóssy	Hungarian Revival Lexicon 1919–1930 – History of the Latest Hungarian Era (A Magyar Feltámadás Lexikona 1919-1930. A magyar legujabb kor története)	Budapest, A Magyar Feltámadás Lexikona Kiadása	1930	
multiple authors	Lexicon of Hungarian Society (A magyar társadalom lexikonja)	Magyar Társadalom Lexikonja Kiadóvállalat	1930	MTDA
Margit Bozzay	Lexicon of Hungarian Women (Magyar asszonyok lexikona)	Budapest	1931	MEK
Imre Gellért – Elemér Madarász (eds.)	Three Decades in Biographies – Monograph of Hungary 1900–1932 (Három évtized története életrajzokban. Magyarország monografiája 1900–1932)	Budapest, Magyarország Monográfiája Kiadóvállalat	1932	
	Hungarian National Lexicon (Magyar nemzeti lexikon)	Budapest	1933	
multiple authors	One Thousand Contemporaries – Lexicon of 1936 (Ezer kortárs. Az 1936-os év lexikona)	Budapest, Magyar Hírlap Rt.	1936	
multiple authors	Who is Who? Lexicon of Contemporaries (Ki-kicsoda? Kortársak lexikona)	Budapest, Béta Irodalmi Rt.	1937	
Pál Vajda	Advanced Tradition of Hungarian Natural Science – Biographical Lexicon with Bibliography (A magyar természettudomány haladó hagyománya. Életrajzi lexikon bibliográfiával, szak- és évfordulómutatóval)	manuscript		
Pál Vajda	Great Hungarian Inventors (Nagy magyar feltalálók)	Budapest	1958	
András Tasnádi Kubacska	Great Hungarian Scientists (Nagy magyar természettudósok)	Budapest	1958	
Ágnes Kenyeres (chief ed.)	Hungarian Biographical Lexicon (Magyar életrajzi lexikon) (4 volumes)	Budapest	1967–1994	MEK
Györgyné Fonó – Tamás Kis (eds.)	Who is Who? Biographical Lexicon of Hungarian and Foreign Persons, Our Contemporaries (Ki kicsoda? Életrajzi lexikon magyar és külföldi személyiségekről, kortársainkról)	Budapest, Kossuth Könyvkiadó	1969	
Ferencné Vészits (ed.)	Small Lexicon of Nobel Laureates (A Nobel-díjasok kislexikona)	Budapest, Gondolat Könyvkiadó	1985	
Péter Domokos	Finno-Ugric Biographical Lexicon (Finnugor életrajzi lexikon)	Budapest, Tankönyvkiadó	1990	
Ferenc Nagy (chief ed.)	Hungarian Scientists Lexicon A–Z (Magyar tudóslexikon A-tól Zs-ig)	Budapest	1997	
Ottó Szabolcs – Géza Závodszky (eds.)	Who's Who, Who is Who in World History? (Who's who, ki kicsoda a világtörténelemben?)	Budapest, Anno Kiadó	1999	
Ottó Szabolcs – Géza Závodszky (eds.)	Who's Who – Millennium Hungary – Who is Who in History? (Who's who – Ezeréves Magyarország – Ki kicsoda a történelemben?)	Budapest, Anno Kiadó	1999	
Jolán Veresegyháziné Kovács	Famous Women Small Lexicon (Híres Asszonyok Kislexikona)	Budapest, Anno Kiadó	1990s	
multiple authors	Who is Who 2000 (Ki kicsoda 2000) (2 volumes)	Budapest, Greger-Biográf Kiadó	2000	
László Markó (chief ed.)	New Hungarian Biographical Lexicon (Új magyar életrajzi lexikon) (6 volumes)	Budapest	2001–2007	
	Who is Who in Hungary (Who is who Magyarországon)	?, Who Is Who Verlag	2003	
Ferenc Glatz (chief ed.)	Members of the Hungarian Academy of Sciences 1825–2002 (A Magyar Tudományos Akadémia tagjai 1825–2002) (3 volumes)	Budapest, MTA Társadalomkutató Központ	2003	
Zoltán Kalapis	Biographical Guide – One Thousand Hungarian Biographies from the Former Yugoslav Countries (Életrajzi kalauz – Ezer magyar biográfia a délszláv országokból) (3 volumes)	Novi Sad, Forum Könyvkiadó	2003	

== Lists of major Hungarian professional lexicons / Nagyobb magyar szaklexikonok listái ==
The following lists try to collect the most important lexicons and lexicon-like encyclopedias in the Hungarian language, either independently or in reverse order, according to fields and within chronological order.

=== Biology / Biológia ===
Author, editor	Title	Place of publication, publisher	Release year	Electronic contact
Sándor Wolsky (ed.)	Biological Lexicon (Biológiai lexikon)	Budapest, Franklin-Társulat	1943	
Hans Frey	The Aquarist’s Small Lexicon (Az akvarista kislexikona)	Budapest, Gondolat Könyvkiadó	1970	
Tamás Muraközy – Géza Zánkai – Kálmán Szende (eds.)	Modern Biology in Keywords (A modern biológia címszavakban)	Budapest, Natura	1974	
F. Brunó Straub (chief ed.)	Biological Lexicon (Biológiai lexikon) (4 volumes)	Budapest, Akadémiai Kiadó	1975–1982	
Jolán Mohay	Genetics Small Lexicon (Genetika kislexikon)	Budapest, Natura Könyvkiadó Vállalat	1986	
multiple authors	Environmental Lexicon (Környezetvédelmi lexikon) (2 volumes)	Budapest, Akadémiai Kiadó	1993	
Rod Preston-Mafham – Ken Preston-Mafham	Illustrated Cactus Lexicon (Kaktuszok képes lexikona)	Budapest, Corvina Kiadó Kft.	1993	
Pál Sárkány – János Szinák	Great Dog Lexicon (Nagy kutyalexikon)	Budapest, Dunakanyar 2000 Könyvkiadó Kft.	1995	
?	Illustrated Cat Lexicon (Képes cicalexikon)	Budapest, Anno Kiadó	1999	
multiple authors	Lexicon of Famous Animals (Híres állatok lexikona)	Budapest, Athenaeum 2000 Kiadó	2003	
Hans Kothe	Mushroom Lexicon (Gombalexikon)	Pécs, Alexandra Kiadó	2006	
Marcell Kiss	Great Pine and Evergreen Lexicon (Nagy fenyő és örökzöld lexikon)	Kisújszállás, Pannon-Literatúra Kft.	2006	
multiple authors	Academic Lexicons – Environmental Protection (Akadémiai lexikonok – Környezetvédelem) (2 volumes)	Budapest, Akadémiai Kiadó	2007	
László Szabó	Biological Concepts (Biológiai fogalmak)	Debrecen, Fonó 33 Bt.	2000s	
Karolina Ficzere	Youth Lexicon – Biological Small Lexicon (Ifjúsági lexikon – Biológiai kislexikon)	Budapest, Pro-Team Kiadó	2010	

=== Astronomy, astronautics / Csillagászat, űrhajózás ===
Author, editor	Title	Place of publication, publisher	Release year	Electronic contact
Károly Lassovszky – Antal Réthly (eds.)	Astronomical and Meteorological Lexicon (Csillagászati és meteorológiai lexikon)	Budapest, Franklin Irodalmi és Nyomdai Rt.	1943	
Iván Almár (chief ed.)	Astronautics Lexicon (Űrhajózási lexikon)	Budapest, Akadémiai Kiadó – Zrínyi Katonai Kiadó	1981, 1984	
Lajos Bartha – Miklós Marik – Béla Balázs	History of Astronomy: Biographical Lexicon A–Z (Csillagászattörténet. Életrajzi lexikon A–Z)	Budapest, Tudományos Ismeretterjesztő Társulat Budapesti Szervezete	1982	
István Gazda Jr. – Miklós Marik	Astronomical History ABC (Csillagászattörténeti ABC)	Budapest, Tankönyvkiadó	1982, 1986	
Gyula Kisbán (ed.)	Astronomy Small Lexicon (Csillagászati kislexikon)	Budapest, Fiesta Kft. – Saxum Kft.	1998	
Lajos Bartha – József Könnyű – Edina Pischné Könnyű	Biographical Lexicon of Hungarian Astronomers (Magyarországi Csillagászok Életrajzi Lexikonja)	Magyar Amatőrcsillagászok Baráti Köre	2000	Csillagaszat.hu

=== Electronics, telecommunications / Elektronika, híradástechnika ===
Author, editor	Title	Place of publication, publisher	Release year	Electronic contact
György Szabó – Béla Magyari (eds.)	Radio Engineering Small Lexicon (Rádiótechnikai kislexikon)	Budapest, Műszaki Könyvkiadó	1959	
Béla Magyari	Electronics Mini Lexicon (Elektronikai minilexikon)	Budapest, Műszaki Könyvkiadó	1971	
Róbert Tuschák (chief ed.)	Electrotechnical Small Lexicon (Elektrotechnikai kislexikon)	Budapest, Műszaki Könyvkiadó	1973	
Béla Magyari (ed.)	Radio Mini Lexicon (Rádió minilexikon)	Budapest, Műszaki Könyvkiadó	1973	
László Nozdroviczky	TV Mini Lexicon (Tv minilexikon)	Budapest, Műszaki Könyvkiadó	1974	
Dániel Csabai (ed.)	Sound Engineering Mini Lexicon (Hangtechnikai minilexikon)	Budapest, Műszaki Könyvkiadó	1975	
Miklós Izsák (chief ed.)	Telecommunication Small Lexicon (Híradástechnikai kislexikon)	Budapest, Műszaki Könyvkiadó	1976	
Sándor Ádám	Popular Electronics Mini Lexicon (Népszerű elektronikai minilexikon)	Budapest, LSI Alkalmazástechnikai Szolgálat	1985	
Karl-Heinz Rumpf	Electronics Components Small Lexicon (Elektronikai alkatrészek kislexikonja)	Budapest, Műszaki Könyvkiadó	1992	
multiple authors	Electrotechnical Small Lexicon (2 volumes) (Elektrotechnikai kislexikon)	Bucharest, Kriterion Könyvkiadó	1994	

=== Photography / Fényképészet ===
Author, editor	Title	Place of publication, publisher	Release year	Electronic contact
Rezső Fehér	Amateur Photographers’ Textbook and Lexicon (Amatőr fényképezők tankönyve és lexikona)	Budapest, Fehér és Tsa	é. n. [1930s]	
Zoltán Kleeberg – Viktor Vigh (eds.)	Practical Photo Lexicon (Gyakorlati fotolexikon)	Budapest, Budapest Székesfőváros Irodalmi és Művészeti Intézet	é. n. [1930s]	
multiple authors	Photo Lexicon (Fotolexikon)	Budapest, Akadémiai Kiadó	1963	
György Morvay (chief ed.)	New Photo Lexicon (Új fotolexikon)	Budapest, Műszaki Könyvkiadó	1984	

=== Cinematography / Filmművészet ===
Author, editor	Title	Place of publication, publisher	Release year	Electronic contact
Henrik Castiglione – Sándor Székely (eds.)	Film Lexicon (Filmlexikon)	Budapest, private edition	1941	
Péter Ábel (ed.)	Film Mini Lexicon (Film kislexikon)	Budapest, Akadémiai Kiadó	1964	
Edit Lajta – Istvánné Putnoky – Péter Ábel (eds.)	New Film Lexicon (Új filmlexikon) (2 volumes)	Budapest, Akadémiai Kiadó	1973	
István Karcsai Kulcsár (ed.)	Who’s Who in Contemporary Hungarian Cinematography (Ki kicsoda a mai magyar filmművészetben?)	Budapest, Hungarian Film Science Institute and Film Archive	1983	
Károly Csala – József Veress (eds.)	Film Lexicon from 1945 to Present (Filmlexikon 1945-től napjainkig) (2 volumes)	Budapest, Totem Publishing	1994	
József Veress (ed.)	Hungarian Film Lexicon (Magyar Filmlexikon) (2 volumes)	Budapest, Hungarian National Film Archive	2005	
József Mudrák – Tamás Deák	Hungarian Sound Film Lexicon 1931–1944 (Magyar hangosfilm lexikon 1931–1944)	Máriabesnyő–Gödöllő, Attraktor Kft.	2006	

=== Philosophy, aesthetics / Filozófia, esztétika ===
Author, editor	Title	Place of publication, publisher	Release year	Electronic contact
Pál Sándor	Philosophical Lexicon (Filozófiai lexikon) (6 volumes)	Budapest, Faust Publishing	é. n. [1930s]	
multiple authors	Philosophical Lexicon (Filozófiai lexikon)	Budapest, Szikra Könyvkiadó	1955	
Dénes Zoltai – István Szerdahelyi (eds.)	Aesthetic Mini Lexicon (Esztétikai kislexikon)	Budapest, Kossuth Kiadó	1972, expanded 1979	
István Csibra – István Szerdahelyi	Aesthetic ABC (Esztétikai ABC)	Budapest, Kossuth Kiadó	1977, 1978	
Igor Szemjonovics Kon (ed.)	Ethical Mini Lexicon (Etikai kislexikon)	Budapest, Kossuth Kiadó	1984	
multiple authors	Philosophical Lexicon (Filozófiai lexikon)	Budapest, Szent István Társulat	2005	
Attila Nádori (ed.)	Philosophy – Britannica Hungarica Mini Encyclopedia (Filozófia – Britannica Hungarica kisenciklopédia)	Budapest, Kossuth Kiadó	2016	
Ferenc Gerencsér	Three Thousand Years of Philosophy (A filozófia háromezer éve)	Budapest, Tárogató Bt.	é. n.	

=== Physics / Fizika ===
Author, editor	Title	Place of publication, publisher	Release year	Electronic contact
Lajos Bálint – Gyula Dávid – László Heinrich (eds.)	Physics Mini Lexicon (Fizikai kislexikon)	Bucharest, Kriterion Publishing	1976	
Miklós Szilágyi (ed.)	Physics Mini Lexicon (Fizikai kislexikon)	Budapest, Műszaki Könyvkiadó	1977	
István Gazda Jr. – Márton Sain	ABC of the History of Physics (Fizikatörténeti ABC)	Budapest, Tankönyvkiadó	1980	

=== Geography / Földrajz ===
Author, editor	Title	Place of publication, publisher	Release year	Electronic contact
Jenő Cholnoky	Lexicon of Explorers (Felfedezők lexikona)	Budapest, Franklin-Társulat Magyar Irodalmi Intézet és Könyvnyomda	c. 1930	
Ferenc Koch – László Petres (eds.)	Pocket Lexicon of Geography (Földrajzi zseblexikon)	Budapest, Művelt Nép Tudományos és Ismeretterjesztő Könyvkiadó	1955	
Gerő Csinády	Notable Hungarian Geographers in the Age of Great Geographical Discoveries, 15th–17th c. (Érdemes magyar geográfusok a nagy földrajzi felfedezések (XV–XVII. sz.) korában)	Budapest	1958	
István Kende (chief ed.)	Lexicon of Developing Countries (Fejlődő országok lexikona)	Budapest, Akadémiai Kiadó	1973	
Gyula Dávid (eds.)	Mini Lexicon of Geography (Földrajzi kislexikon)	Bukarest, Kriterion Könyvkiadó	1976	
Miklós Mészáros (eds.)	Mini Lexicon of Geology (Geológiai kislexikon)	Bukarest, Kriterion Könyvkiadó	1983	
Dénes Balázs	Lexicon of Hungarian Travelers (Magyar utazók lexikona)	Budapest, Panoráma	1993	
Endre Tari	Geographical Explorers (Földrajzi felfedezők)	Budapest, Junior Kiadó	1993	
Béla Veresegyházi	Lexicon of Geographical Discoveries (Földrajzi felfedezések lexikona)	Budapest, Saxum Kiadó	2001	
György Bánosi – Attila Törőcsik	Lexicon of Peoples (Népek lexikona)	Budapest, Saxum Kiadó	2002	
multiple authors	Lexicon of World Travelers (Világjárók lexikona)	Budapest, Reader's Digest Kiadó Kft.	2005	
multiple authors	Lexicon of Countries A–Z (Országok lexikona A–Z)	Budapest, Magyar Nagylexikon Kiadó	2007	
József Tóth – András Trócsányi	Who’s Who in Hungarian Geography (Ki kicsoda a magyar geográfiában?)	Pécs, PTE	2009	
Béla Herczeg	Youth Lexicon – Mini Lexicon of Geography (Ifjúsági lexikon – Földrajzi kislexikon)	Budapest, Pro-Team Kiadó	2010	
Jerzy Kwiatek	Europe A to Z (Európa A-tól Z-ig)	Budapest, Reader's Digest Kiadó Kft.	2012	

=== Genealogy / Genealógia ===
Author, editor	Title	Place of publication, publisher	Release year	Electronic contact
Iván Nagy	Hungary’s Families with Coats of Arms and Genealogical Tables (Magyarország családai czimerekkel és nemzékrendi táblákkal, 12+1 kötet)	Pest, Ráth Mór kiadása	1857–1868	MEK
Mór Wertner	Genealogical History of the Medieval South Slavic Rulers (A középkori délszláv uralkodók genealogiai története)	Temesvár, Csanád-Egyházmegyei Könyvsajtó	1891	REAL-EOD
Mór Wertner	Family History of the Árpáds (Az Árpádok családi története)	Nagybecskerek, Pleitz Ferencz Pál Könyvnyomdája	1892	REAL-EOD
Béla Kempelen	Hungarian Noble Families (Magyar nemes családok, 11 kötet)	Budapest, Grill Károly Könyvkiadóvállalata	1911–1932	Arcanum
Béla Kempelen	Hungarian High-Ranking Families (Magyar főrangú családok)	Budapest, Szerzői kiadás	1931	REAL-EOD
Béla Kempelen	Hungarian Jewish and Jewish-Origin Families (Magyar zsidó és zsidóeredetű családok, 3 kötet)	Budapest, Szerzői kiadás	1937–1939	
János József Gudenus	Genealogy of the Hungarian Nobility in the 20th Century (A magyarországi főnemesség XX. századi genealógiája, 5 kötet)	Budapest, Natura–Tellér Kft.–Heraldika	1990–1999	

=== Military science, police knowledge / Hadtudomány, rendőrségi ismeretek ===
Author, editor	Title	Place of publication, publisher	Release year	Electronic contact
J. Mihályfalvy	Gendarmerie Lexicon (Csendőr-lexikon)	Budapest, Légrády-Testvérek	1899	
Miklós Rédey – Imre Laky	Police Lexicon (Rendőrségi lexicon)	Budapest, Stephaneum	1903	MEK
Ferenc Ruzsin	Air Defense Lexicon (Légvédelmi lexikon)	Eger, Egri Nyomda Rt.	1937	
Sándor Zachár (eds.)	Military Pocket Lexicon (Katonai zseb-lexikon)	Budapest, Attila-nyomda Rt.	1939	
multiple authors	Mini Lexicon of Military Technology (Haditechnikai kislexikon)	Budapest, Zrínyi Katonai Könyv- és Lapkiadó	1971, 1976	
Antal Babos – Antal Bojtás – János Csipes	Military Lexicon (Katonai lexikon)	Budapest, Zrínyi Katonai Könyv- és Lapkiadó	1985	
multiple authors	Lexicon of Military Science (Hadtudományi lexikon, 2 kötet)	Budapest, Magyar Hadtudományi Társaság	1995	
multiple authors	Hungary in World War II – Lexicon A–Z (Magyarország a második világháborúban – Lexikon A–Zs)	Budapest, Petit Real Könyvkiadó	1996	Arcanum
multiple authors	Hungary in World War I – Lexicon A–Z (Magyarország az első világháborúban – Lexikon A–Zs)	Budapest, Petit Real Könyvkiadó	2000	
Attila Weiszhár – Balázs Weiszhár	Lexicon of Wars (Háborúk lexikona)	Budapest, Athenaeum 2000 Kiadó	2007	

=== Local history / Helytörténet ===
Author, editor	Title	Place of publication, publisher	Release year	Electronic contact
László Peretsényi Nagy	Writers and Scholars of Arad County up to 1818 / Arad vármegyének írói és tudóssai 1818-edik esztendeig	manuscript (19th century)		
Ferenc Kazinczy	Writers of Arad County 1586–1822 / Arad vármegyei írók 1586–1822	manuscript (19th century)		
János Soltész	Biographies of Professors of the Sárospatak College / A sárospataki főiskola tanárainak életrajza	Sárospatak	1864	
Alajos Zelliger	Writers of Esztergom County / Esztergom vármegyei írók, vagyis Esztergom városában és vármegyében született, vagy működött írók koszorúja	Budapest	1888	
Viktor Récsey	Writers of Vas County / Vasmegyei írók	Sopron	1888	
Samu Borovszky	Writers and Teachers of Debrecen / Debreczeni írók és tanárok	?	1898	
Gerzson Ádám	Nagykőrös Athenaeum / Nagykőrösi Athenás	Nagykőrös	1904	
Zsigmond Kovács	Writers of Kassa from the Battle of Mohács to the Present / Kassai írók a mohácsi vésztől máig	Kassa	1907	
Imre Guthi	Capital Almanac Lexicon and Guide 1910–1912 / Fővárosi almanach lexikon és útmutató 1910–1912	Budapest	1912	
Kálmán Osvát (ed.)	Transylvanian Lexicon / Erdélyi lexikon	Nagyvárad, Szabadsajtó Könyv- és Lapkiadó Rt.	1928	
Ágoston Hortobágyi	Somogy Helicon / Somogyi Helikon	Kaposvár	1928	
Jenő Damó	Who is Who? Lexicon of Transylvanian and Banat Public Life / Ki Kicsoda? Az erdélyi és bánsági közélet lexikonja	Temesvár–Arad, Lexika Publishing Company	1931	
Ottó Lederer (ed.)	100 Years of Újpest: Újpest–Rákospalota Lexicon / A 100 éves Újpest története. Újpest–rákospalotai lexikon	Budapest, Negyedi Szabó Béláné Kiadása	1936	
Lajos Hell	Illustrated Lexicon of Budapest / Budapest képes lexicona	Budapest, Akadémiai Kiadó	1939	MEK
Ernő Sági	Little Lexicon of Lake Balaton / Balatoni kis lexikon. A balatoni könyv és balatoni címtár melléklete	Budapest	1940	
József Pataki	Short List of Historical Figures of Tolna County / Megyénk (Tolna m.) történelmi kiválóságainak rövid jegyzéke	Szekszárd	1958	
Sándor Frisnyák	Geographers of Borsod in the 16th–19th Centuries / Borsodi földrajzírók a XVI–XIX. században	Miskolc	1959	
József Kovacsics	Historical Lexicon of Veszprém County (2 vols.) / Veszprém megye helytörténeti lexikona	Sátoraljaújhely, Kazinczy Ferenc Társaság	1964–1988	
multiple authors	Józsefváros Lexicon / Józsefvárosi lexikon	Budapest, MSZMP VIII. Kerületi Bizottsága – Fővárosi Tanács VIII. Kerületi Tanácsa	1970	
multiple authors	Budapest Lexicon (2nd ed., 2 vols.) / Budapest lexikon	Budapest, Akadémiai Kiadó	1973, rev. 1993	

=== Literature / Irodalom ===
Author, editor	Title	Place of publication, publisher	Release year	Electronic contact
Péter Bod	Magyar Athenas / Magyar Athenas	Nagyszeben	1766	REAL-EOD
Jakab Ferenczy, János Danielik	Hungarian Writers: Biographical Collection / Magyar írók. Életrajzgyűjtemény (2 vols.)	Pest	1856–1858	REAL-EOD
Unknown	Portraits and Biographies of Hungarian Writers / Magyar írók arczképei és életrajzai (unfinished, 1 vol.)	Pest	1858	Google Books
Károly Moenich, Sándor Vutkovich	Directory of Hungarian Writers / Magyar irók névtára	Pozsony	1876	Google Books
József Szinnyei	Life and Works of Hungarian Writers / Magyar írók élete és munkái (14 vols.)	Budapest	1891–1914	MEK
Gyula Mokos	About Our Writers / Iróink életéhez	Budapest	1907	
Béla Tóth	Lexicon of Quotations / Szálló igék lexikona	Budapest, Franklin-Társulat	1906	
Heinrich Schlandt	Hungarian-German Proverbs Lexicon / Magyar-német Közmondások Lexikona	Brassó, E. Kerschner kiadása	1913	
Pál Gulyás	Hungarian Biographical Lexicon / Magyar életrajzi lexikon	Budapest, Lantos Rt.	1925–1929	
Ferenc Ványi (ed.)	Hungarian Literary Lexicon / Magyar irodalmi lexikon	Budapest, "Studium" kiadása	1926	
Marcell Benedek (ed.)	Literary Lexicon / Irodalmi lexikon	Budapest, Győző Andor Kiadása	1927	
Lajos Dézsi (ed.)	World Literary Lexicon / Világirodalmi lexikon (3 vols.)	Budapest, Studium	1931–1933	
Pál Gulyás	Life and Works of Hungarian Writers – New Series / Magyar írók élete és munkái – új sorozat (31 vols.)	Budapest	1939–1944 (A–Dz), 1990–2002 (E–Ö), 2024–2025 (P–Zy)	
József Révay (ed.)	Hungária Literary Lexicon / Hungária irodalmi lexikon	Budapest, Hungária Kiadó	1947	
Pál Gulyás	Lexicon of Hungarian Writer Pseudonyms / Magyar írói álnév lexikon	Budapest, Akadémiai Kiadó	1956	
Marcell Benedek (chief ed.)	Hungarian Literary Lexicon / Magyar irodalmi lexikon (3 vols.)	Budapest, Akadémiai Kiadó	1963–1965	
István Király, István Szerdahelyi (chief eds.)	World Literary Lexicon / Világirodalmi lexikon (19 vols.)	Budapest, Akadémiai Kiadó	1970–1996	ADT
Edgár Balogh, Gyula Dávid (chief eds.)	Hungarian Literary Lexicon in Romania / Romániai magyar irodalmi lexikon (6 vols.)	Bukarest, Kriterion; Kolozsvár, Erdélyi Múzeum-Egyesület	1981–2010	Lexikon.kriterion.ro
István Fazekas (ed.)	Lexicon of Contemporary Hungarian Writers 1959–1988 / Kortárs magyar írók kislexikona 1959–1988	Budapest, Magvető Kiadó	1989	
Klára Székelyné Sipos, Ilona Botosné Koscsó	Who’s Who in Today’s Hungarian Children’s Literature / Ki kicsoda a mai magyar gyermekirodalomban	Debrecen, Csokonai Kiadóvállalat	1991	
Gyula Borbándi	Western Hungarian Literary Lexicon and Bibliography / Nyugati magyar irodalmi lexikon és bibliográfia	Budapest, Hitel Lap-, Könyvkiadó és Kereskedelmi Kft.	1992	MEK
Kornélia Sz. Debreczeni	Lexicon of Hungarian Writer Pseudonyms – Supplement to Gulyás Pál / Magyar írói álnév lexikon. A magyarországi írók álnevei és egyéb jegyei. Gulyás Pál lexikonának kiegészítése	Budapest	1992	

=== Jurisprudence / Jogtudomány ===
Author, editor	Title	Place of publication, publisher	Release year	Electronic contact
Pál Madarassy (eds.)	Lexicon of Stamp and Duty Laws and Regulations (A bélyeg- és illetékek iránti törvények és szabályok lexikona, 3 kötet)	Budapest, Athenaeum kiadása	1893	
János Hegedüs (eds.)	Civil Registry Lexicon (Anyakönyvi lexikon)	Nagy-Becskerek, Pleitz Ferenc Pál kiadása	1897	
Dezső Márkus (eds.)	Hungarian Legal Lexicon (Magyar jogi lexikon, 6 kötet)	Budapest, Pallas Irodalmi és Nyomdai Rt.	1898–1906	
Endre Barazsu (eds.)	Land Registry Lexicon (Telekkönyvi lexikon, 3 kötet)	Nagybánya, Nánásy István kiadása	1909–1910	
György Gryneusz – Pál Huszár (eds.)	Direct Taxes Lexicon (Egyenesadók lexikona, 3 kötet)	Budapest–Szentgotthárd, Grill–Wellisch kiadás	1912	
Mihály Szepesi (eds.)	Manual Lexicon of Legal Fees (A törvénykezési illetékekről szóló törvény kézi lexikona)	Budapest, Politzer Zsigmond kiadása	1918	
multiple authors	Mini Lexicon of Public Administration (Közigazgatási kis lexikon)	Budapest, Pallas Irodalmi és Nyomdai Részvénytársaság	1929	
multiple authors	Encyclopedia of State and Legal Science (Állam- és jogtudományi enciklopédia, 2 kötet)	Budapest, Akadémiai Kiadó	1980	
Vanda Lamm – Vilmos Preschka (eds.)	Legal Lexicon (Jogi lexikon)	Budapest, KJK-KERSZÖV Jogi és Üzleti Kiadó Kft.	1999	

=== Chemistry, chemical industry / Kémia, vegyipar ===
Author, editor	Title	Place of publication, publisher	Release year	Electronic contact
Gábor Koós	Mini Lexicon of Commodity Knowledge (Az áruisme kis lexikona)	Pozsony – Budapest, Staffel Károly kiadása	1899	
Lajos Rácz	Hand Lexicon of Practical Commodity Knowledge and Chemical Goods (Gyakorlati áruismeret és vegyészeti árúk kézi lexikonja)	Budapest, szerző kiadása	1927	
Nándor Lentz	Photochemical Lexicon (Fotovegyszer lexikon)	Budapest, Műszaki Könyvkiadó	1957, 1960, 1962	
Hermann Römpp, Dr.	Chemical Lexicon (Vegyészeti lexikon, 3 kötet)	Budapest, Műszaki Könyvkiadó	1961	
Béla Kiss (eds.)	Mini Lexicon of Plastics and Rubber Industry (Műanyag- és gumiipari kislexikon)	Budapest, Műszaki Könyvkiadó	1971	
Jerzy Chodkowski (eds.)	Small Chemical Dictionary (Kis kémiai szótár)	Budapest, Gondolat Kiadó	1972	
Erhard Ühlein	Römpp Mini Lexicon of Chemistry (Römpp kémiai kislexikon)	Budapest, Műszaki Könyvkiadó	1973	
László Futó	Mini Lexicon of Chemical Fibers (Vegyiszál minilexikon)	Budapest, Műszaki Könyvkiadó	1974	
multiple authors	Mini Lexicon of Analytical Chemistry (Analitikai kémiai kislexikon)	Budapest, Műszaki Könyvkiadó	1978	
Ödön Felszeghy (eds.)	Mini Lexicon of Chemistry (Kémiai kislexikon, 2 kötet)	Bukarest, Kriterion Könyvkiadó	1980	
Lóránt Balázs – Imre Hronszky – Márton Sain	ABC of the History of Chemistry (Kémiatörténeti ABC)	Budapest, Tankönyvkiadó	1981	
multiple authors	Römpp Chemical Lexicon (Römpp Vegyészeti Lexikon, 4 kötet)	Budapest, Műszaki Könyvkiadó	1981–1984	

=== Fine arts, architecture / Képzőművészet, építészet ===
Author, editor	Title	Place of publication, for rent	Release time	Electronic contact
János Szendrei – Gyula Szentiványi (eds.)	Lexicon of Hungarian Fine Artists / Magyar Képzőművészek lexikona	Budapest, Endrényi I. kiadása	1915	https://adtplus.arcanum.hu/hu/collection/Lexikon_MagyarKepzomuveszekLexikona/
Imre Kun	Art Dictionary / Művészeti szótár	Budapest, Grill Károly Könyvkiadóvállalata	1920	
multiple authors	Art Lexicon / Művészeti lexikon (2 kötet)	Budapest, Győző Andor Kiadása	1926; bőv. 1935	
Lóránt Almási Balogh – Laci Ányos – Jenő Bacsó (eds.)	Hungarian Art Lexicon / Magyar művészeti lexikon	Budapest, Nemesvári Ernő kiadás	1936	
Iván Bojár	Construction History Flash Lexicon / Építéstörténeti villámlexikon	Budapest, Különlenyomat az Építőipari és Műszaki kézikönyv 1948. évi VII. kötetéből	1948	
multiple authors	ABC of Art History / Művészettörténeti ABC	Budapest, Terra Kiadó	1961	
multiple authors	Art Lexicon / Művészeti lexikon (4 kötet)	Budapest, Akadémiai Kiadó	1965–1968	
Edit Lajta (ed.)	Art Mini Lexicon / Művészeti kislexikon	Budapest, Akadémiai Kiadó	1973	
Fernand Hazan	Lexicon of Modern Painting / A modern festészet lexikona	Budapest, Gondolat Könyvkiadó	1974	
Klára Baskainé Dienes	Art Topics Mini Lexicon / Művészeti témák kislexikona	Budapest, Tankönyvkiadó Vállalat	1977	
Mihály Kubinszky (ed.)	Modern Architectural Lexicon / Modern építészeti lexikon	Budapest, Műszaki Könyvkiadó	1978	
Jutta Seibert – Ágnes Körber	Lexicon of Christian Art / A keresztény művészet lexikona	Budapest, Corvina Könyvkiadó	1986	
György Seregélyi	Hungarian Painters and Graphic Artists Database / Magyar festők és grafikusok adattára	Szeged	1988	
Hedvig Turai – János Falus (eds.)	Art Lexicon / Művészlexikon (4 kötet)	Budapest, Corvina Kiadó	1994	
Judith Miller – Martin Miller	Antiquities Miller Pocket Lexicon / Antikvitások Miller-féle zseblexikona	Budapest, Láng Kiadó	1995	
Zoltán Nagy	Art Mini Lexicon / Művészeti kislexikon	Kisújszállás, Szalay Könyvkiadó és Kereskedőház Kft.	1997	
Ákos Szabó – Tibor Kállai	Biographical Lexicon of Hungarian Painters and Graphic Artists / Magyar festők és grafikusok életrajzi lexikona (2 kötet)	Nyíregyháza, Magánkiadás	1997	
Gyula Kisbán	Art Mini Lexicon / Művészeti kislexikon	Fiesta-Saxum	1998	
Imre Katona	Porcelain Lexicon / Porcelánlexikon	Budapest, Gesta Könyvkiadó	1999	
Katalin Keszthelyi – Ibolya Laczkó (eds.)	Hungarian Ceramic Art Vol. I / A magyar kerámiaművészet I. kötet	Budapest, Magyar Kerámikusok Társasága	1999	
multiple authors	Contemporary Hungarian Art Lexicon / Kortárs magyar művészeti lexikon (3 kötet)	Budapest, Enciklopédia Kiadó	1999–2001	
János Végh (ed.)	High School Art Lexicon / Középiskolai művészeti lexikon	Budapest, Corvina Kiadó	2000	
Ágnes Körber (chief ed.)	Hungarian Art Mini Lexicon / Magyar Művészeti Kislexikon	Budapest, Enciklopédia Kiadó	2002	
Éva Kiss	Furniture Art Lexicon / Bútorművészeti lexikon	Budapest, Corvina Könyvkiadó	2005	
	Art Mini Lexicon / Művészeti kislexikon	Budapest, Corvina Kiadó	2006	
Valéria Balázs-Arth	Lexicon of Hungarian Fine Artists in the Southern Region / Délvidéki magyar képzőművészeti lexikon	Budapest, Timp Kiadó Kft.	2007	
Gyöngyi Fajcsák (ed.)	Eastern Art Lexicon / Keleti művészeti lexikon	Budapest, Corvina Kiadó	2007	
Kálmán Gyöngy	Hungarian Cartoonists Data and Signatures / Magyar karikaturisták adat- és szignótára	Budapest, Ábra Kkt.	2008	https://web.archive.org/…/magyarkarikatura.com/
Sándor Fábián	Lexicon of Sculptors of the World / A világ szobrászainak lexikona	Mkerámia Kft., Budapest	2008	
multiple authors	Painting A to Z / Festészet A-tól Z-ig	Pécs, Alexandra Kiadó	2008	
Ferenc Gerencsér	Art History Lexicon for Students / Művészettörténeti lexikon diákoknak	Pécs, Puedlo Kiadó	é. n. [2000s]	
?	Who's Who in Art? / Ki kicsoda a művészetben?	Budapest, Laude Kiadó	é. n. [2000s]	
Nándor Salamon (ed.)	Kisalföld Art Lexicon / Kisalföldi művészeti lexikon	Vasszilvágy, Magyar Nyugat Könyvkiadó	2012	
Gábor Takács	Art Collectors in Hungary from the Late 18th Century to the Early 21st Century / Műgyűjtők Magyarországon a 18. század végétől a 21. század elejéig	Budapest, Kieselbach Galéria	2012	
Attila Nádori (ed.)	Art Styles – Britannica Hungarica Mini Encyclopedia / Művészeti stílusok – Britannica Hungarica kisenciklopédia	Budapest, Kossuth Kiadó	2014	
György Ruzsa	Lexicon of Icon Painting / Az ikonfestészet lexikona	Budapest, Corvina Kiadó	2014	

=== Communication and Media Science / Kommunikáció- és médiatudomány ===
Author, editor	Title	Place of publication, publisher	Release year	Electronic contact
István Bodrits – János Viczián (eds.)	Who's Who in Telecommunications? (Ki kicsoda a hírközlésben?)	Szekszárd, Babits Kiadó	1993	

=== Light industry / Könnyűipar ===
Author, editor	Title	Place of publication, publisher	Release year	Electronic contact
Miklós Biró – Árpád Kertész – László Novák (eds.)	Printing Lexicon (Nyomdászati lexikon)	Budapest, Biró Miklós kiadása	1936	MEK
Mihály Nagy – Lóránt Bak	Textile ABC: Popular Terms in Textiles (Textil ABC. Textil fogalmak – népszerűen)	H. n., Textilipari Műszaki és Tudományos Egyesület	1969	
Lászlóné Vermes – Ferenc Schmél – László Vermes (eds.)	Mini Lexicon of Leather and Footwear Industry (Bőr- és cipőipari minilexikon)	Budapest, Műszaki Könyvkiadó	1975	
Kálmán Bakódi – Gyula Murlasits	Mini Lexicon of Artificial Leather (Műbőrők minilexikon)	Budapest, Műszaki Könyvkiadó	1983	
Lászlóné Páris	Mini Lexicon of Adhesive Technology (Ragasztáschnikai minilexikon)	Budapest, Műszaki Könyvkiadó	1983	
multiple authors	Specialized Lexicon of Paper Industry (Papíripari szaklexikon)	H. n., Papír-press Egyesülés	2003	

=== Book publishing / Könyvkiadás ===
Author, editor	Title	Place of publication, publisher	Release year	Electronic contact
Ernő Szolnoki	Bibliographical Lexicon (Bibliográfiai lexikon)	Vörösváry Kiadóvállalat, Budapest	1943	
József Kiss – Sára Jakab	Who's Who in the Hungarian Book Profession (Ki kicsoda a magyar könyvszakmában)	Budapest, Kiss József Könyvkiadó Kft.	2005	
Sándor András Kicsi	Hungarian Book Lexicon (Magyar könyvlexikon)	Budapest, Kiss József Könyvkiadó Kft.	2006	

=== Economics / Közgazdaságtudomány ===
Author, editor	Title	Place of publication, publisher	Release year	Electronic contact
Sándor Halász – Gyula Mandelló	Economic Lexicon (Közgazdasági lexikon) (3 kötet)	Budapest, Pallas Irodalmi és Nyomdai Rt.	1898–1901	
Emil Czakó – Zoltán Gara	Small Commercial Lexicon (Kis kereskedelmi lexikon)	Budapest, Lampel Róbert (Wodianer Ferenc és Fiai) Császári és Királyi Könyvkereskedése	1906	
László Gerő – János Bud – Jenő Czettler – József Szterényi – Frigyes Korányi – Ferenc Fodor – Pál Teleki	Economic Encyclopedia (Közgazdasági enciklopédia) (4 kötet)	Budapest, Athenaeum Irodalmi és Nyomdai Rt.	1929	
Béla Schack	Révai Commercial, Financial and Industrial Lexicon (Révai Kereskedelmi, Pénzügyi és Ipari Lexikona) (4 kötet)	Budapest, Révai Testvérek	1929–1931	
Farkas Heller	Economic Lexicon (Közgazdasági lexikon)	Budapest, Grill Károly Könyvkiadóvállalata	1937	
János Kiszely	Small Economic Encyclopedia (Kis közgazdasági enciklopédia)	Budapest, Private edition	c. 1930s	
Róbert Major	World Economy Mini Encyclopedia (A világgazdaság kis enciklopédiája)	Budapest, Renaissance Kiadás	1941	
G. A. Kozlov – Sz. P. Pervusina – V. A. Abramov – A. M. Alekszejev	Economic Mini Lexicon (Közgazdasági kislexikon)	Budapest, Kossuth Kiadó	1960	
Jenő Wilcsek – István Fogaras – István Tiszai	Business Economics Lexicon (Vállalatgazdasági lexikon) (2 kötet)	Budapest, Közgazdasági és Jogi Könyvkiadó	1966	
István Földes	Political Economy Mini Dictionary (Gazdaságpolitikai kisszótár)	Budapest, Kossuth Könyvkiadó	1966	
Tamás Muraközy – Lajos Varga – Lajos Nagy	Economic ABC for Farmers (Közgazdasági ABC mezőgazdáknak)	Budapest, Mezőgazdasági Könyvkiadó	1967	
Ferenc Kozma – Antal Mátyás – Tamás Morva – János Gyenis – László Pongrácz	Economic Mini Lexicon (Közgazdasági kislexikon)	Budapest, Kossuth Kiadó	1968	
Tamás Muraközy – Ferenc Zátkai	Economic ABC (Közgazdasági ABC)	Budapest, Mezőgazdasági Könyvkiadó – Közgazdasági és Jogi Könyvkiadó	1973	
Zoltán Botka – Sándor Fekete – Ferencz Flór – Sándor Horváth – László Popper – József Rózsa	Explanation of Economic Terms for Workplace Managers (Gazdasági fogalmak magyarázata munkahelyi vezetők részére)	Budapest, Közgazdasági és Jogi Könyvkiadó	1973	
Gyula Virizlay – Béla Donáth – Ernő Kabos – József Kohári	Trade Union Mini Lexicon (Szakszervezeti Kislexikon)	Budapest, Táncsics Könyvkiadó	1975	
László Berettyán – István Buda – László Nagy – Pál Rókusfalvy	Labour Mini Lexicon (Munkaügyi kislexikon)	Budapest, Kossuth Könyvkiadó	1976	
József Berényi – János Gyenis	Political Economy Mini Dictionary (Gazdaságpolitikai kisszótár)	Budapest, Kossuth Könyvkiadó	1976	
Zsuzsa Varsádi – Aladár Sipos – Gyuláné Sebestyén	Mini Dictionary of Political Economy (A politikai gazdaságtan kisszótára)	Budapest, Kossuth Könyvkiadó	1981	
Iván Wiesel – Zsuzsa Varsádi – Gyuláné Sebestyén	Political Economy Mini Dictionary (Gazdaságpolitikai kisszótár)	Budapest, Kossuth Könyvkiadó	1983	
Iván Wiesel – Zsuzsa Varsádi	World Economy Mini Dictionary (Világgazdasági kisszótár)	Budapest, Kossuth Könyvkiadó	1984	
Tamás Bácskai	Financial and Commercial Encyclopedia (Pénzügyi és Kereskedelmi Enciklopédia)	Budapest, Novotrade Rt.	1988	
több szerző	Who's Who in the Hungarian Cooperative Movement (Ki kicsoda a magyar szövetkezeti mozgalomban)	Budapest, Kossuth Kiadó	1989	
Mária Brüll	Economic-Financial Mini Lexicon (Gazdasági-pénzügyi kislexikon)	Budapest, Szakmai Továbbképző és Átképző Vállalat	c. 1990s	
több szerző	Hungarian Tax Lexicon A–Z (Magyar adólexikon A–Z)	Budapest, Novorg	1995	
Péter Huszár	Economic and Financial Mini Lexicon 1996–1997 (Gazdasági és pénzügyi kislexikon 1996–1997)	Budapest, VéHáeS Kft.	1997?	
Gábor Lenkei	1000 Words About Money (1000 szó a pénzről)	Budapest, Kávé Kiadó	1999	

=== Transport knowledge / Közlekedés ismeretek ===
Author, editor	Title	Place of publication, publisher	Release year	Electronic contact
Rezső Morva	Automobile Drivers Lexicon (Automobilvezetők lexikona)	Budapest, Révai Testvérek Irodalmi Intézet R. T.	1918	
József Csécsy – Leó Vécsey	Auto Lexicon (Autólexikon)	Budapest, Frommer József kiadása	1928	
Lajos Urbán (főszerk.)	Railway Lexicon (Vasúti lexikon) (3 kötet)	Budapest, Műszaki Könyvkiadó	1984–1991	
Béla Buna – István Emőd – János Deák	Automobile Mini Lexicon and Ten-Language Technical Dictionary (Autós minilexikon és tíznyelvű szakszótár)	Budapest, Műszaki Könyvkiadó	1985	
Tamás Székely	Sailing Mini Lexicon (Vitorlás kislexikon)	Budapest, Műszaki Könyvkiadó	1990	
József Szabó	Aviation Lexicon (Repülési lexikon) (2 kötet)	Budapest, Akadémiai Kiadó	1991	

=== Mathematics / Matematika ===
Author, editor	Title	Place of publication, publisher	Release year	Electronic contact
Miklós Farkas – Károly Csébfalvy – András Kósa	Mathematical Mini Lexicon (Matematikai kislexikon)	Budapest, Műszaki Könyvkiadó	1972, 1978	
Márton Sain	ABC of the History of Mathematics (Matematikatörténeti ABC)	Budapest, Tankönyvkiadó; 2nd edition: Typotex	1974, 1993	
több szerző	Mathematical Mini Lexicon (Matematikai kislexikon)	Bukarest, Kriterion Könyvkiadó	1983	
Judit Oláh (szerk.)	Mathematical Pocket Lexicon (Matematikai zseblexikon)	Budapest, Akadémiai Kiadó–Typotex	1992	
Ágnes Dezső – Zoltán Édes – Péter Sárkány	High School Mathematical Lexicon (Középiskolai matematikai lexikon)	Budapest, Corvina Kiadó	1997	

=== Meteorology / Meteorológia ===
Author, editor	Title	Place of publication, publisher	Release year	Electronic contact
Antal Simon	Biographical Lexicon of Hungarian Meteorologists (Magyarországi meteorológusok életrajzi lexikonja)	Budapest, Országos Meteorológiai Szolgálat	2004	

=== Agricultural science / Mezőgazdaságtan ===
Author, editor	Title	Place of publication, publisher	Release year	Electronic contact
Adorján Bezerédi – Zoltán Szilassy	Agricultural Lexicon (Mezőgazdasági lexikon) (2 volumes)	Budapest, Légrády Testvérek	1905–1906	
több szerző	Agricultural Lexicon (Mezőgazdasági lexikon) (2 volumes)	Budapest, Grill Károly Könyvkiadóvállalata	1920	
több szerző	Agricultural Lexicon (Mezőgazdasági lexikon) (2 volumes)	Budapest, Mezőgazdasági Kiadó	1958	
több szerző	Horticultural Lexicon (Kertészeti lexikon)	Budapest, Mezőgazdasági Kiadó	1963	Tuja.hu
több szerző	Forestry – Hunting – Wood Industry Lexicon (Erdészeti – vadászati – faipari lexikon)	Budapest, Mezőgazdasági Kiadó	1964	
Lajos Szűcs	Lexicon for Plant Lovers (A növénykedvelő kislexikona)	Budapest, Gondolat Kiadó	1977	
több szerző	Agricultural Lexicon (Mezőgazdasági lexikon) (2 volumes)	Budapest, Mezőgazdasági Kiadó	1982	
szerk. Ambrus Burján – László Fébó	Agroeconomic Mini Lexicon (Agrárökonómiai kislexikon)	Budapest, Mezőgazdasági Kiadó	1985	
szerk. Lajos Für – János Pintér	Hungarian Agrarian Biographies (Magyar agrártörténeti életrajzok) (3 volumes)	Budapest, Magyar Mezőgazdasági Múzeum	1987–1989	
szerk. Csaba Gallyas – Istvánné Sárossy	Agricultural Mini Lexicon (Mezőgazdasági kislexikon)	Budapest, Mezőgazdasági Kiadó	1989	
szerk. Margit Balogh	Who’s Who in Hungarian Agriculture? (Ki kicsoda a magyar mezőgazdaságban?) (2 volumes)	Szekszárd, Babits Kiadó	1997	
Nico Vermeulen	Encyclopedia of Houseplants (Szobanövények enciklopédiája)	Budapest, Gabo Könyvkiadó	2002	

=== Museology / Muzeológia ===
Author, editor	Title	Place of publication, publisher	Release year	Electronic contact
eds. László Élesztős – Gyula Viga – Sándor Bodó	Portrait Hall of Hungarian Museums / Magyar múzeumi arcképcsarnok	Budapest, Pulszky Társaság–Tarsoly Kiadó	2002	
ed. Sándor Bodó	Portrait Hall of Hungarian Museums II / Magyar múzeumi arcképcsarnok II.	Budapest, Pulszky Társaság	2024	

=== Works of art, literary works / Műalkotások, irodalmi művek ===
Author, editor	Title	Place of publication, publisher	Release year	Electronic contact
István Tótfalusi	Lexicon of Literary Figures / Irodalmi alakok lexikona	Budapest, Móra Ferenc Ifjúsági Könyvkiadó (2nd ed.: Anno Kiadó)	1992, 1998	
István Tótfalusi	Who’s Who in Shakespeare’s World / Ki kicsoda Shakespeare világában	Budapest, Móra Könyvkiadó	1994	
György Széplaki	Who? What? Where? Hungarian Narrative and Dramatic Works for High School Students / Ki? Mi? Hol? Magyar elbeszélő és drámai művek lexikona a középiskolások számára	Budapest, Corvina	2000	
Robert Foster	Tolkien Encyclopedia A to Z / Tolkien enciklopédia A-tól Z-ig	Szeged, Szukits	2002	
Róbert Hadnagy – Gabriella Molnár	Agatha Christie Crime Guide, or Murders in ABC Order / Agatha Christie krimikalauz, avagy Gyilkosságok ABC-ben	Budapest, Európa Kiadó	2004, 2011	
multiple authors	Lexicon of Works (3 vols) / Művek lexikona (3 kötet)	Budapest, Magyar Nagylexikon kiadása	2008	

=== Cultural history / Művelődéstörténet ===
Author, editor	Title	Place of publication, publisher	Release year	Electronic contact
István Kállay – László Zsámbéki	Hungarian Lexicon of Cultural History / Magyar művelődéstörténeti kislexikon	Budapest, Könyvértékesítő Vállalat	1986	
eds. Lajos Adamik – Péter Zirkuli	Symbol Collection / Jelképtár	Budapest, Helikon Kiadó	1990, 1994, 1995, 1996, 1997, 2000, 2004, 2010	
Sándor András Kicsi – László András Magyar	Heptad Lexicon / Hetes lexikon	Budapest, Enciklopédia Kiadó	2002	
chief ed.: Péter Kőszeghy	Hungarian Lexicon of Cultural History / Magyar művelődéstörténeti lexikon (13 vols + 1 index)	Budapest, Balassi Kiadó	2003–2014	MTA
Bethsabée Blumel – Michel Guillemot	Lexicon of Symbols / Szimbólumok lexikon	Saxum	2009	

=== Ethnography / Néprajz ===
Author, editor	Title	Place of publication, publisher	Release year	Electronic contact
multiple authors	Hungarian Ethnographic Lexicon (5 vols) / Magyar néprajzi lexikon	Budapest, Akadémiai Kiadó	1982	MEK

=== Linguistics / Nyelvészet ===
Author, editor	Title	Place of publication, publisher	Release year	Electronic contact
Vilmos Bárdosi – Imre Karakai	Lexicon of the French Language / A francia nyelv lexikona	Budapest, Corvina Publishing House	1996	
János Kovács – Péter A. Lázár – Marion Merrick	A–Z English Grammar: A Lexicon / A–Z angol nyelvtan. Lexikon	Budapest, Corvina Publishing House	2002	

=== Medicine / Orvostudomány ===
Author, editor	Title	Place of publication, for rent	Release time	Electronic contact
Károly Ziffer	Popular Medical Guide or Home Encyclopedia on Healthy and Sick Humans / Népszerű orvosi tanácsadó vagy házi lexikon az egészséges és beteg emberről (2 vols)	Budapest, Vilmos Mehner Publishing	1881	
Endre Kazay	Pharmaceutical Lexicon / Gyógyszerészi lexikon (4 vols)	Nagybánya, Mihály Molnár Publishing	1900	
Jenő Vincze	Diseases and Their Treatment: Health Mini-Lexicon / Betegségek és gyógyításuk. Egészségügyi kislexikon	Budapest, Élet és Egészség Publishing	1940s?	
György Kovács (ed.)	The Doctor in the Family / Orvos a családban (5 vols)	Budapest, Tolnai Publishing House	1940s?	
not specified	Lexicon of Health / Az egészség lexikona	h. n., k. n.	1940s?	
Endre Réti	Great Hungarian Doctors / Nagy magyar orvosok	Budapest	1959	
Harry Jellinek (ed.)	Health ABC / Egészségügyi ABC	Budapest, Medicina Publishing	1967, 1970, 1974, 1985	
Zsuzsa Hollán (chief ed.)	Medical Lexicon / Orvosi lexikon (4 vols)	Budapest, Akadémiai Kiadó	1967–1973	
multiple authors	New Health ABC / Új egészségügyi ABC	Budapest, Medicina Publishing	1990	
János Fekete	Lexicon of Alcohol-Related Disorders / Alkohológiai kislexikon	h. n., National Alcohol Research Institute – National Public Health Institute – Anti-Alcoholism Committee	1990s?	
Ernst Meyer-Carnberg	Lexicon of Naturopathy / Természetgyógyászati kislexikon	Budapest, Tulipán Publishing	1990s?	
Roberta Altman – Michael J. Sarg	Lexicon of Cancer Diseases / A rákbetegségek lexikona	Budapest, Corvina Publishing	1996	
Géza Urr (ed.)	Lexicon of Naturopathy / Természetgyógyászati kislexikon	Nyíregyháza, Black & White Publishing	2001	
Gergely András	Lexicon of Distinguished Hungarian Jewish Doctors / Jeles magyar zsidó orvosok lexikona	Budapest, Makkabi Publishing	2001	
Károly Kapronczay	Hungarian Medical Biographical Lexicon / Magyar orvoséletrajzi lexikon	Budapest, Mundus Publishing	2004	
Dr. Stephen Amiel	Medical Lexicon for the Family / Orvosi lexikon a családnak (2 vols)	Budapest, Excalibur Publishing	2004	
Werner Bartens	Lexicon of Medical Myths / Orvosi tévhitek lexikona	Budapest, Partvonal Publishing	2006	
László Horváth Jr., MD	Lexicon of Dog Diseases / Kutyabetegségek lexikona	Budapest, Arión Publishing	2009	
not specified	New Health Lexicon / Új Egészségügyi Lexikon	Pécs, Alexandra Publishing	2000s?	

=== Pedagogy / Pedagógia ===
Author, editor	Title	Place of publication, publisher	Release time	Electronic contact
Károly Verédy (ed.)	Paedagogical Encyclopaedia / Paedagogiai encyclopaedia	Budapest, Athenaeum Literary and Printing Co.	1886	
Gyula Novák – Károly Szabó (eds.)	Lexicon of Writing and Reading Methods / Az írás-olvasási módszerek lexikona (vol. 1 unfinished)	Veszprém, Pósa E. Publisher	1911	
Henrik Kőrösi (ed.)	Encyclopaedia of Elementary Education / Az elemi népoktatás enciklopédiája (3 vols)	Budapest, Franklin Literary and Printing Co.	1911–1915	
Alajos Baumgartner	Lexicon of Teachers and Alumni of the I. District State Verbőczy István Secondary School / A budapesti I. kerületi M. Kir. Állami Verbőczy István Reálgimnázium összes tanárainak és irodalmi vagy művészeti tevékenységet kifejtő végzett növendékeinek lexikona	Budapest, Budai Printing Co.	1927	
Lajos Bene (ed.)	Lexicon of Hungarian Teachers / Magyar tanítók lexikona	Budapest, Private edition	c. 1930s	
Ernő Fináczy – Gyula Kornis – Ferenc Kemény (eds.)	Hungarian Pedagogical Lexicon / Magyar pedagógiai lexikon (2 vols)	Budapest, Révai Brothers Literary Institute	1934	
Sándor Nagy (chief ed.)	Pedagogical Lexicon (1976–1979) / Pedagógiai lexikon (4 vols)	Budapest, Akadémiai Kiadó	1976–1979	
Sándor Ádám	Small Lexicon of Educational Technology / Oktatástechnikai kislexikon	Budapest, Youth Publishing Company	1983	
György Hargitai (ed.)	Small Lexicon of Adult Education / Felnőttoktatási kislexikon	Budapest, Kossuth Publishing	1987	
Zoltán Báthory – Iván Falus (chief eds.)	Pedagogical Lexicon (1997) / Pedagógiai lexikon (3+1 vols)	Budapest, Keraban Publishing	1997	
Zoltán Báthory – Iván Falus	Who’s Who of Pedagogy 1997 / Pedagógiai ki kicsoda 1997	Budapest, Keraban Publishing	1997	
Zsolt Mezei – Gyula Tungli – Katalin Mészárosné Stenger (eds.)	Lexicon of Pápa Educators / Pápai pedagógus lexikon	Pápa, Pápa Society of Cultural History	1997	
Zsuzsa Mesterházi (ed.)	Lexicon of Special Education / Gyógypedagógiai lexikon	Budapest, ELTE Bárczy Gusztáv College of Special Education	2001	
multiple authors	Portrait Hall of Educators (24 vols until 2025) / Pedagógusok arcképcsarnoka (2025-ig 24 kötet)	Budapest, Karácsony Sándor Pedagogical Association	2002–	kspe.hu
multiple authors	Lexicon of Adult Education and Training A–Z / Felnőttoktatási és -képzési lexikon A–Z	Budapest, Hungarian Pedagogical Society – OKI Publisher – Szaktudás Publishing House	2002	
Károly Csáky	Famous Teachers of Selmecbánya / Híres selmecbányai tanárok	Dunaszerdahely, Lilium Aurum	2003	MEK
Géza Körmendi	Register of Tata Secondary School 1765–2007 / A tatai gimnázium névtára 1765-2007	Budapest, Argumentum Publisher	2007	
Imre Radosiczky (ed.)	Who’s Who in Hungarian Education: Higher Education, Adult Education, Vocational Training and Language Schools / Ki kicsoda a magyar oktatásban. Felsőoktatás, felnőttképzés, szakképzés és nyelviskolák (3 vols)	Budapest, DFT-Hungária Ltd.	2007	

=== Political science / Politológia ===
Author, editor	Title	Place of publication, for rent	Release time	Electronic contact
	Political and Parliamentary Lexicon / Politikai és parlamenti lexikon (in vol. IV of the series Political Hungary / Politikai Magyarország)	Budapest, Anonymus Historical Publishing Company	1914	
László T. Boros	Hungarian Political Lexicon / Magyar Politikai Lexikon	Budapest, Hungarian Political Lexicon Publishing Company	n. d. [1929]	
editors Ferenc Erdős – Lajos Burget	Political Concise Lexicon / Politikai kislexikon	Budapest, Youth Press Publishing Company	1966	
	Concise Lexicon of the Political Debate Circle / A Politikai Vitakör Kislexikona	Budapest, Agitation and Propaganda Department of the Central Committee of the MSZMP	1974	
editors József Kardos – Irén Simándi	European Political Systems / Európai politikai rendszerek	Budapest, Osiris Publishing Ltd.	1990	
multiple authors	Glossary of Civil Law / Polgári jogi fogalomtár	Budapest, HVG-Orac Ltd.	2004	
editor Jenő Horváth	World Political Lexicon (1945–2005) / Világpolitikai lexikon (1945–2005)	Budapest, Osiris Publishing Ltd.	2005	
László Pomogyi	Hand Dictionary of Hungarian Constitutional and Legal History / Magyar alkotmány- és jogtörténeti kéziszótár	Budapest, M-érték Publishing House	2008	
Péter Szentmihályi Szabó	Civic Political Lexicon / Polgári politikai lexikon	Budapest, Kairosz Publishing House	2008	
István Vida	Lexicon of Political Parties in Hungary, 1846–2010 / Magyarországi politikai pártok lexikona 1846–2010	Budapest, Gondolat Publishing Circle	2011	

=== Psychology, sexology / Pszichológia, szexológia ===
Author, editor	Title	Place of publication, for rent	Release time	Electronic contact
editor Mrs. László Majzik	Parents’ Concise Lexicon / Szülők kislexikona	Budapest, Kossuth Publishing House	1966	
P. G. Hesse – K. Dietz	Sexology / Szexológia	Budapest, Gondolat Publishing House	1975	
multiple authors	Psychological Lexicon / Pszichológiai lexikon	Budapest, Helikon Publishing House	1987	
editor Péter Popper	Lexicon of Love / Lexikon a szerelemről	n. p., Kossuth Publishing House – National Council of Hungarian Women	1987	
multiple authors	Psychological Lexicon / Pszichológiai lexikon	Budapest, Corvina Publishing House	1997	
	Lexicon of the Fundamental Concepts of Carl Gustav Jung / Carl Gustav Jung alapfogalmainak lexikona (3 volumes)	Budapest, Kossuth Publishing House	1997–1998	
Jacques Martel	Lexicon of Psychosomatic Diseases / Lelki eredetű betegségek lexikona	Budapest, Partvonal Publishing House	2007, 2009, 2010	
Csaba Pléh – Ottilia Boross	Psychological Lexicon / Pszichológiai lexikon	Budapest, Akadémiai Publishing House	2013	

=== Sports / Sport ===
Author, editor	Title	Place of publication, for rent	Release time	Electronic contact
Mihály Zsingor	Gymnastics Lexicon / Torna lexikon	Budapest, Association of Hungarian Gymnastics Clubs	1896	
editor Endre Csánk	Concise Sports Lexicon / Kis sportlexikon	Budapest, Rózsavölgyi és Társa	é. n. [1930s?]	MEK
editor Imre Kőszegi	Water Polo Lexicon / Vizipólólexikon (2 volumes)	Budapest, Athenaeum Literary and Printing Joint Stock Company	1935	
János Földessy	Concise Olympic Lexicon / Olimpiai kis lexikon	Budapest, Sport Newspaper and Book Publisher	1960	
chief editor László Nádori	Sports Lexicon / Sportlexikon (2 volumes)	Budapest, Sport	1985–1986	
Tamás Plavecz – Nándor Plavecz	Concise Lexicon of Japanese and Chinese Martial Arts / Japán és kínai harcművészetek kislexikona	Budapest, HungariaSport Advertising and Marketing Company	1988	
Kálmán Vándor	Football Lexicon / Futball lexikon	Budapest, HungariaSport Advertising and Marketing Company	1990	
Otto Borik	Chess Lexicon / Sakklexikon	Budapest, Corvina Publishing House	1994	
Péter Kozák	Who’s Who in Hungarian Sports? / Ki kicsoda a magyar sportéletben? (3 volumes)	Szeged, Babits Publishing House	1995	
Sándor Árvay	Hungarian Tennis Lexicon / Magyar teniszlexikon	n. p., RedaktorSport	2009	
editors Zoltán Molnár – Dániel Lovas	Hungarian Chess Lexicon / Magyar sakklexikon	Kecskemét, Panton Ltd.	2009	
László Hetyei	From Albert to Zsengellér: Top Scorers of the Hungarian Football Championships / Alberttől Zsengellérig. A magyar labdarúgó-bajnokságok gólkirályai	Budapest, Aposztróf Publishing House	2010	
Károly Áros	Hungarian Athletes from Transylvania at the Olympic Games / Erdélyi magyar sportolók az olimpiákon	Szentendre, Published by Károly Szabó	2012	
László Rózsaligeti	Lexicon of Hungarian Olympic Gold Medalists / Magyar olimpiai aranyérmesek lexikona	Budapest, Corvina Publishing House	2012	
László Rózsaligeti	Hungarian Olympic Lexicon / Magyar olimpiai lexikon; 5th expanded, revised edition	Budapest, Corvina Publishing House	2016	

=== Statistics / Statisztikatudomány ===
Author, editor	Title	Place of publication, for rent	Release time	Electronic contact
chief editor Dávid Rózsa	Portraits from the History of Hungarian Statistics and Demography / Portrék a magyar statisztika és népességtudomány történetéből	Budapest, Library of the Hungarian Central Statistical Office	2014	

=== Stylistic / Stilisztika ===
Author, editor	Title	Place of publication, for rent	Release time	Electronic contact
István Szathmári	Stylistic Lexicon / Stilisztikai lexikon. Stilisztikai fogalmak magyarázata szépirodalmi példákkal szemléltetve	Budapest, Tinta Könyvkiadó	2004	
István Szathmári	Figure of Speech Lexicon / Alakzatlexikon. A retorikai és stilisztikai alakzatok kézikönyve	Budapest, Tinta Könyvkiadó	2008	
István Szathmári	Mini Lexicon of Stylistic Devices and Figures / Stíluseszközök és alakzatok kislexikona	Budapest, Tinta Könyvkiadó	2010	

=== Computer technology / Számítástechnika ===
Author, editor	Title	Place of publication, for rent	Release time	Electronic contact
editors P. Müller – G. Löbel – H. Schmid	Small Computer Technology Lexicon / Számítástechnikai kislexikon	Budapest, Műszaki Könyvkiadó	1973	
Endre Jodál	Small Computer Technology Lexicon / Számítástechnikai kislexikon	Bucharest, Kriterion Könyvkiadó	1990	
András Hegedűs	Small Computer Technology Lexicon / Számítástechnikai kislexikon	Budapest, OTP Bank	n. d. [1990s]	
Ádám Sándor	Popular Computer Technology Mini Lexicon / Népszerű számítástechnikai kislexikon	Budapest, self-published	n. d. [1990s]	
László Horváth – József Pirkó	Windows – Computer Technology Mini Lexicon / Windows – Számítástechnikai kislexikon	Budapest, Kossuth Kiadó	1997	
Gábor Fekete	Small Computer Technology Lexicon / Számítástechnikai kislexikon	Budapest, Aquila Könyvkiadó	2007	
Zoltán Bódi	Info Dictionary: Origin, Explanation and Use of IT Terms / Infoszótár. Informatikai fogalmak eredete, magyarázata és használata	Budapest, Tinta Könyvkiadó	2011	

=== Acting / Színművészet ===
Author, editor	Title	Place of publication, for rent	Release time	Electronic contact
editor Henrik Incze	Hungarian Acting Lexicon / Magyar színészeti lexikon (Appendix to "Magyar zenészeti lexikon"; only reached letter "H".)	Budapest, Henrik Incze kiadása	1908–1910	
Gyula Némedy	Small Lexicon of Theatre Studies / A színháztudomány kis lexikona	Szeged, Leopold Nyomda	1911	
editor Aladár Schöpflin	Hungarian Performing Arts Lexicon / Magyar színművészeti lexikon (4 volumes)	Budapest, Országos Színészegyesület és Nyugdíjintézete	1929–1931	MEK
multiple authors	Acting Lexicon / Színészeti lexikon (2 volumes)	Budapest, Győző Andor Kiadása	1930	
Zsolt Harsányi – György Kürthy	Small Theatre Lexicon / Színházi kis lexikon	Budapest, Légrády Testvérek R.-T.	é. n. [1930s?]	
chief editor Ferenc Hont – Ferenc Staud	Small Theatre Lexicon / Színházi kislexikon	Budapest, Gondolat Kiadó	1969	
editor Magda B. Fábri	Contemporary Hungarian Actor Lexicon / Kortárs magyar színészlexikon	Budapest, Magazin Kiadó	1991	
multiple authors	Hungarian Theatre Arts Lexicon / Magyar színházművészeti lexikon	Budapest, Akadémiai Kiadó	1994	MEK
Sándor Enyedi	Without Stage / Rivalda nélkül	Budapest, Teleki László Alapítvány	1999	
Sándor Enyedi	Actors, Theatres, Cities – Lexicon of Hungarian Theatre Arts Beyond the Borders / Színészek, színházak, városok. A határon túli magyar színházművészet kislexikona	Budapest–Kolozsvár, Balassi Kiadó – Polis Kiadó	2005	
József Kötő	Public Knowledge on Acting in Transylvania 1919–1940 / Közhasznú ismeretek tára. Színjátszó személyek Erdélyben (1919–1940)	Kolozsvár, Polis Kiadó	2009	
Antal Gyergyel	Who is Who – Actors / Ki Kicsoda – Színészek	Budapest, Anno Kiadó	é. n.	

=== Sociology / Szociológia ===
Author, editor	Title	Place of publication, for rent	Release time	Electronic contact
editor József Madzsar	Social Lexicon / Társadalmi lexikon	Budapest, Népszava	1928	
André Akoun – Pierre Ansart – Bertrand Badie	Sociological Lexicon / Szociológiai lexikon	Budapest, Corvina Könyvkiadó	1999	

=== Oration doctrine / Szónoklattan ===
Author, editor	Title	Place of publication, for rent	Release time	Electronic contact
editor Tamás Adamik	Rhetorical Lexicon / Retorikai lexikon	Pozsony, Kalligram Könyv- és Lapkiadó Kft.	2010	

=== Dance art / Táncművészet ===
Author, editor	Title	Place of publication, for rent	Release time	Electronic contact
Gyula Salgó – Döme Lugosi	Pocket Encyclopedia of Opera and Ballet (Opera és balett zseblexikon)	Szeged, Bartos-Nyomda	1933	
Horst Koegler	Ballet Encyclopedia (Balettlexikon)	Budapest, Editio Musica Budapest Zeneműkiadó	1977	
Gyula Pálfy (selected)	Concise Encyclopedia of Folk Dance (Néptánc kislexikon)	Budapest, Planétás Kiadó	1997	
Gedeon Dienes (editor)	Hungarian Encyclopedia of Dance Art (Magyar táncművészeti lexikon)	Budapest, Planétás Kiadó – Magyar Tánctudományi Társaság	2008	
Martha Bremser (editor)	Fifty Contemporary Choreographers (Ötven kortárs koreográfus)	H. n., L’Harmattan	2009	

=== Natural sciences, engineering, technical sciences in general / Természettudományok, mérnöki, műszaki tudományok általában ===
Author, editor	Title	Place of publication, publisher	Year of publication	Electronic contact
Jákó Wühr (editor)	Railway Encyclopedia (6 volumes) (Vasuti lexikon)	Budapest, Rautmann F. kiadása	1879	
L. Rév (editor)	Handbook for Railway Engineers (Kézi lexikon vasúti mérnökök számára)	Szeged, ?	1911	
Rezső Morvai (editor)	Encyclopedia for Automobile Drivers (Automobilvezetők lexikona)	Budapest, Révai Rt.	1912	
Ede Lósy-Schmidt – Béla Barát (editors)	Technical Encyclopedia (Technikai lexikon)	Budapest, Győző Andor kiadása	1928	
multiple authors	Encyclopedia of Natural Sciences (1934) (Természettudományi lexikon)	Budapest, Királyi Magyar Természettudományi Társulat	1934	
Ferenc Tarján – Pál Braun (editors)	Encyclopedia of New Inventions and Discoveries (Új találmányok és felfedezések lexikona)	Budapest, Fővárosi Könyvkiadó	1947	
Lajos Jánossy – Tibor Erdey-Grúz – Jenő Ernst (editors)	Nuclear Encyclopedia (Atommaglexikon)	Budapest, Akadémiai Kiadó	1963	
Gyula Füvesi (editor)	Television Concise Encyclopedia (Televízió kislexikon)	Budapest, MHS Rákóczi Lapkiadó	1964	
Tibor Erdey-Grúz (chief editor)	Encyclopedia of Natural Sciences (7 volumes) (Természettudományi lexikon)	Budapest, Akadémiai Kiadó	1964–1976	
Károly Polinszky (chief editor)	Technical Encyclopedia (4 volumes) (Műszaki lexikon)	Budapest, Akadémiai Kiadó	1970–1978	
Alajos Hir – Béla Oravecz (editors)	Construction Concise Encyclopedia (Építőipari kislexikon)	Budapest, Műszaki Könyvkiadó	1971	
Gábor Bíró – Samuné Borbély – Erik Dux	Concise Encyclopedia of Natural Sciences (3rd edition, 2 volumes) (Természettudományi kislexikon)	Budapest, Akadémiai Kiadó	1971, 1976, expanded 1989	
Lajos Urbán (editor)	Railway Encyclopedia (Vasúti lexikon)	Budapest, Műszaki Könyvkiadó	1984	
Emil Szluka – László Schneider (editors)	Who's Who in Natural and Technical Sciences (2 volumes) (Természettudományos és műszaki ki kicsoda?)	Budapest, Országos Műszaki Információs Központ és Könyvtár Kiadása	1986–1988	
Sándor Solt (editor)	Who Manufactures, Researches, Designs, Assembles, Provides, Produces and Consumes (2 volumes) (Ki mit gyárt, kutat, tervez, szerel, szolgált, termelőfogyasztás)	Budapest, Műszaki Könyvkiadó	1988	
Ferenc Nagy (editor)	Hungarians in the History of Science and Technology (Magyarok a természettudomány és a technika történetében)	Budapest, Orsz. Műszaki Információs Központ és Könyvtár	1992	
Margit Pusztainé Jámbor	Inventors (Feltalálók)	Budapest, Unió Kiadó Diákkönyvműhely	1994	
Pálné Hetényi (chief editor)	Who's Who in Technical and Natural Sciences, A–Z (Műszaki és természettudományi ki kicsoda, A–Z)	Budapest, Országos Műszaki Információs Központ és Könyvtár kiadása	1995	

=== History / Történelem ===
Author, editor	Title	Place of publication, publisher	Year of publication	Electronic contact
Zalán Endrei	A History of the World (6 volumes) (A világ történelme)	Budapest	1906–1908	
Sámuel Mindszenthy	Ladvocat for the Abbot… Historical Dictionary (6 volumes) (Ladvocat apáturnak … historiai dictionariuma)	Komárom	1795–1797	
Ferenc Budai	Encyclopedia for the Civil History of Hungary (3 volumes) (Magyarország polgári historiájára való lexikon)	Nagyvárad	1804–1805	
Antal Mindszenthy	New Historical Dictionary (2 volumes) (Uj historiai dictionarium)	Pozsony	1808–1809	
Benjámin Mokry	General Historical-Biographical Lexicon (4 volumes) (Közönséges historiai-biographiai lexikon)	Pest	1819–1820	
Özséb Tipold	Pocket Dictionary of World Historical Places (Világtörténelmi helyek zsebszótára)	Pécs, ?	1871	
Antal Németh	Historical Pocket Dictionary (Történelmi zsebszótár)	Győr, ?	1883	
Vilmos Pecz (editor)	Ancient Encyclopedia (2 volumes) (Ókori lexikon)	Budapest, Franklin Irodalmi és Nyomdai Rt.	1902–1904	
Sándor Takáts	Old Hungarian Captains and Generals (2 volumes) (Régi magyar kapitányok és generálisok)	Budapest	1922–1928	
József Lajos Torbágyi Novák	Rulers and Leading Figures – Historical Handbook (Uralkodók és főemberek – Történelmi segédkönyv)	Budapest	1928	
Károly Bálint	Dictionary of Historical Place Names and Terms (Történelmi helynevek és műkifejezések szótára)	Szentgotthárd, Wellisch Béla kiadása	1920s	
multiple authors	World History Encyclopedia (2 volumes) (Világtörténelmi lexikon)	Budapest, Forrás Könyvkiadó	circa 1943	
multiple authors	Historical Concise Encyclopedia (3 volumes) (Történelmi kislexikon)	h. n., k. n.	1969–1971	
Henrik Vass – Endre Bassa – Ernő Kabos (editors)	Labor Movement Historical Encyclopedia (Munkásmozgalom-történeti lexikon)	Budapest, Kossuth Könyvkiadó	1972	
Gábor Bona	Generals and Staff Officers in the 1848–49 War of Independence (Tábornokok és törzstisztek a szabadságharcban 1848–49)	Budapest, Zrínyi Katonai Könyv- és Lapkiadó	1983	
multiple authors	Habsburg Encyclopedia (Habsburg lexikon)	Budapest, Új Géniusz Könyvkiadó Kft.	1990	
Erika Szepes (editor)	Antique Encyclopedia (Antik lexikon)	Budapest, Corvina Kiadó Kft.	1993	
Béla Veresegyházi	Historical-Topographical Concise Encyclopedia (Történelmi-topográfiai kislexikon)	Budapest, Aqua Kiadó	1994	
Gyula Kristó	Early Hungarian Historical Encyclopedia (9th–14th century) (Korai magyar történeti lexikon (9–14. század))	Budapest, Akadémiai Kiadó	1994	
János Poór (editor)	Universal Historical Concise Encyclopedia (Egyetemes történeti kislexikon)	Budapest, Maecenas Könyvek	1996	
Mária Sebestyén	Lexicon of Historical Figures (Történelmi személyek lexikona)	Budapest, Tóth Könyvkereskedés Kiadó Kft.	1997	
György Dupka	Hungarian Subcarpathian Gulag Encyclopedia (Kárpátaljai Magyar Gulag-lexikon)	Ungvár–Budapest, Intermix Kiadó	1999	
Attila Dömötör	Historical Encyclopedia (Történelmi lexikon)	Budapest, Saxum Kiadó	1999	
Zoltán Pintér (editor)	Historical Encyclopedia (Történelmi lexikon)	Budapest, Szalay Könyvkiadó	2000	
	World Historical Encyclopedia: People, Dates, Events (Világtörténelmi enciklopédia. Személyek, dátumok, események)	Budapest, Reader's Digest Kiadó Kft.	2000	
Béla Veresegyházi	Encyclopedia of the Discovery of America 1492–1600 (Amerika felfedezése lexikon 1492-től 1600-ig)	Budapest, Anno Kiadó	circa 2000	
Béla Veresegyházi	Lexicon of Peace Treaties (Békeszerződések lexikona)	Budapest, Anno Kiadó	circa 2000	
György Bánosi – Béla Veresegyházi	Foreign Rulers (Külföldi uralkodók)	Budapest, Junior Kiadó	circa 2000	
György Bánosi – Béla Veresegyházi	Lost Peoples, Lost Empires (Eltűnt népek, eltűnt birodalmak)	Budapest, Junior Kiadó	circa 2000	
	Historical Encyclopedia: People, Events, Objects, Places, and Concepts A–Z (Történelmi lexikon. Személyek, események, tárgyak, helyek és fogalmak A-tól Z-ig)	Budapest, Könyvmíves Könyvkiadó Kft.	circa 2000	
	Hungarian Historical Encyclopedia (Magyar Történelmi lexikon)	Nyíregyháza, Black & White Kiadó	circa 2000	
Miklós Ács – Miklós Lechmann – Andrea Farkas	Historical Encyclopedia: People – Terms – Explanations (Történelmi lexikon. Személyiségek – fogalmak – magyarázatok)	Budapest, Diáktéka Kiadó	circa 2000	
Gyula Hegedűs	Lexicon of Historical Documents (Történelmi dokumentumok lexikona)	Budapest, Athenaeum 2000 Kiadó	2001	
Péter Bihari – Imre Knausz – Ildikó Repárszky – Albert Török	High School Historical Encyclopedia (Középiskolai történelmi lexikon)	Budapest, Corvina Kiadó	2001	
multiple authors	Rulers and Dynasties (Uralkodók és dinasztiák)	Budapest, Magyar Világ Kiadó	2001	
German Hafner	Encyclopedia of Famous Figures of Antiquity (Ókori hírességek lexikona)	Budapest, Elektra Kiadóház	2002	
Béla Veresegyházi	Historical Place Names A–Z (Történelmi helynevek A-Z-ig)	Budapest, Saxum Kiadó	2002	
Anna Dudás (editor)	Lexicon of Slovak History (A szlovák történelem lexikona)	Pozsony, Slovenské Pedagogické Nakladatelstvo	2003	
Tamás Csiffáry	Historical Encyclopedia (Történelmi lexikon)	Budapest, Könyvmíves Könyvkiadó	2005	
Gusztáv Heckenast	Who's Who in the Rákóczi War of Independence? (Ki kicsoda a Rákóczi-szabadságharcban?)	Budapest, História-MTA Törttudományi Intézet	2005	
László Markó	Hungarian State Dignitaries from Saint Stephen to the Present (A magyar állam főméltóságai Szent Istvántól napjainkig)	Budapest, Magyar Könyvklub	2008	
János Rózsás	Gulag Encyclopedia (Gulag lexikon)	Nagykanizsa, A Magyar Műveltség Kincsestára kiadása	2008	
István Zombori – István Bodrits (editors)	Hungarian Historian-Museologist Who's Who 2010 (Magyar történész-muzeológus ki kicsoda 2010)	Budapest, Móra Ferenc Múzeum – Magyar Nemzeti Múzeum	2010	
Ágnes Simkóné Kiss	Youth Encyclopedia – Historical Concise Encyclopedia (Ifjúsági lexikon – Történelmi kislexikon)	Budapest, Pro-Team Kiadó	2010	
István Erdélyi	Hungarian Prehistory Mini Encyclopedia (Magyar őstörténeti minilexikon)	Budapest, Napkút Kiadó	2012	
multiple authors	The Ancient World – Greece – Britannica Hungarica Mini Encyclopedia (Az antik világ – Görögország – Britannica Hungarica kisenciklopédia)	Budapest, Kossuth Kiadó	2015	
multiple authors	The Ancient World – Rome – Britannica Hungarica Mini Encyclopedia (Az antik világ – Róma – Britannica Hungarica kisenciklopédia)	Budapest, Kossuth Kiadó	2015	
Zsolt Molnár	Trianon Mini Encyclopedia A–Z (Trianon-kislexikon A-tól Z-ig)	Budapest, IKU-Inter-MNYKNT	2020	

=== Religion, Mythology, Theology / Vallás, mitológia, teológia ===
Author, editor	Title	Place of publication, publisher	Release time	Electronic contact
András Illyés	Example of Christian Life / A keresztényi életnek példája vagy tüköre	Nagyszombat	1682	Google Books
Péter Bod	Saint Polycarp of Smyrna / Smirnai Szent Polikárpus	Nagyenyed	1746	Google Books
Péter Bod	Saint Heortocrates / Szent Heortokrátes	Nagyszeben	1757	Google Books
Thomas Broughton	Historical Lexicon of Religion / Brougthonnak a religióról való históriai lexicona (3 vols)	Komárom	1792–1793	
Ferenc Tóth	Lives of Superintendents in the Danube Region Following the Helvetic Faith / A helvetziai vallástételt tartó túl a dunai főtiszteletű superintendentziában élt superintendensek, vagy református püspökök élete	Komárom	1808	
Ferenc Tóth	Lives of Superintendents in the Tisza Region Following the Helvetic Faith / A helvétziai vallástételt követő túl a tiszai superintendentziában élt református püspökök élete	Komárom	1812	Google Books
Pál Bedeő	Lives of the Saints / Szentek élete	Pozsony	1847	
János Zalka – Ferenc Zsihovics – János Debreczeni	Lives of the Saints / Szentek élete (5 vols)	Eger	1859–1876	
Máté Vogel	Lives of the Saints / Szentek élete (3 vols)	Kalocsa	1866–1868	
Antal Arzén Karcsú	History of the Roman Popes from Saint Peter to the Present / A római pápák történelme Szent Pétertől korunkig	Szeged–Pest	1869–1871	
István Májer	Literary Activity of the Archdiocese of Esztergom Clergy in Modern Times / Az esztergomi érseki főmegye papságának közműveltségére ható irodalmi működése a legújabb korban	Esztergom	1873	
Károly Szentkuti Kiss	New Hungarian Athenaeum / Új magyar Athenás	Budapest	1887	
József Gergely	Biblical Lexicon / Bibliai lexikon	Budapest	1890	
István Patzner – Rudolf Gaith	Pastoral Lexicon / Lelkipásztori lexikon	Temesvár	1892	
Ákos Koncz	Priests of Eger Diocese in Literature / Egri egyházmegyei papok az irodalmi téren	Eger	1892	REAL-EOD
Alajos Zelliger	Hall of Church Writers / Egyházi írók csarnoka	Nagyszombat	1893	B.E.M.S.
Samu Borovszky	Evangelical Reformed Clergy of Tiszántúl 1597–1679 / Tiszántuli ev. ref. papok. 1597–1679	Budapest	1898	
Crescens Lajos Dedek	Lives of the Saints / Szentek élete (2 vols)	Budapest	1900	
Ferenc Kollányi	Canons of Esztergom 1100–1900 / Esztergomi kanonokok 1100–1900	Esztergom	1900	REAL-EOD
György Hahnekamp	Hungarian Converts: Biographical Data / Magyar konvertiták. Életrajzi adatok	Budapest	1900	
Ferenc Chobot	History of the Popes / A pápák története	Rákospalota	1909	
Ferenc Chobot	Historical Register of the Diocese of Vác / A váci egyházmegye történeti névtára	Vác	1915–1917	REAL-EOD
István Hamar – János Murányi	Biblical Hand Lexicon / Bibliai kézi lexikon	?	1919	
Péter Újvári (ed.)	Hungarian Jewish Lexicon / Magyar zsidó lexikon	Budapest	1929	MEK
Sándor Czeglédy – Kálmán Kállay (eds.)	Sylvester Biblical Lexicon / Sylvester bibliai lexikona	Budapest, Sylvester Printing Institute	1929–1931	
multiple authors	Catholic Lexicon / Katolikus lexikon (4 vols)	Budapest	1931–1933	ADT
Antal Schütz (ed.)	Lives of Saints for Every Day of the Year / Szentek élete az év minden napjára	Budapest, Saint Stephen Society	1932–1933	
Flóris Kühár	Liturgical Lexicon / Liturgikus lexikon	Komárom	1933	UNITAS
György Balanyi (ed.)	Hungarian Piarists in the 19th and 20th Century / Magyar piaristák a XIX. és a XX. században	Budapest	1942	
Ferenc Monay	Data on the Literary Work of Minorites in Hungary and Transylvania / Adatok a magyarországi és erdélyi minoriták irodalmi munkásságáról	Rome	1953	
Jenő Zoványi – Sándor Ladányi (ed.)	Lexicon of Hungarian Protestant Church History / Magyarországi protestáns egyháztörténeti lexikon	Budapest	1977	DRK Elektronikus Könyvtár
Gusztáv Gecse	Small Lexicon of the History of Religion / Vallástörténeti kislexikon	Budapest, Kossuth Publishing	1983	
Klára D. Major (ed.)	Ábel–Zsuzsanna: Illustrated Biblical Lexicon / Ábel–Zsuzsanna. Képes bibliai lexikon	Budapest, Economic and Legal Publishing	1987–1988	
János Pfeiffer	Historical Register of Veszprém Diocese 1630–1950 / A veszprémi egyházmegye történeti névtára (1630–1950)	Munich	1987	
Károly Jólesz	Small Lexicon of Jewish Religious Life / Zsidó hitéleti kislexikon	Budapest, Korona GT	1987	
Sergei A. Tokarev (chief ed.)	Mythological Encyclopaedia / Mitológiai enciklopédia (2 vols)	Budapest, Gondolat Publishing	1988	
Herbert Haag	Biblical Lexicon / Bibliai lexikon	Budapest, Saint Stephen Society	1989	
Mária Grabner	Saints and Blesseds / Szentek, boldogok	Budapest, Unió Publishing	1990s	
István Tótfalusi	Who’s Who in the Bible / Ki kicsoda a Bibliában	Budapest, Anno Publisher	1990s	
Zoltán Hangay	Book of Popes / Pápák könyve	Budapest, Trezor Publisher	1991	
István Diós (chief ed.)	Hungarian Catholic Lexicon / Magyar katolikus lexikon (17 vols)	Budapest, Saint Stephen Society	1993–2010	Lexikon.katolikus.hu
Gerhard J. Bellinger	Great Guide to Religion / Nagy valláskalauz	Budapest, Akadémiai Kiadó	1993	
István Tótfalusi	Who’s Who in Ancient Myths / Ki kicsoda az antik mítoszokban	Budapest, Móra Könyvkiadó	1993	
multiple authors	Lexicon of Saints / Szentek lexikona	Budapest, Dunakönyv Publishing	1994	
multiple authors	Christian Biblical Lexicon / Keresztyén bibliai lexikon (2 vols)	Budapest, Hungarian Reformed Church	1995	
Ernő Hetényi	Buddhist Lexicon / Buddhista lexikon	Budapest, Trivium Publishing	1997	
György Szabó	Small Mythological Lexicon / Mitológiai kislexikon	Budapest, Könyvkuckó Publishing	1998	
Alan Unterman	Lexicon of Jewish Traditions / Zsidó hagyományok lexikona	Budapest, Helikon Publishing	1999	
multiple authors	Unitarian Small Lexicon / Unitárius kislexikon	Budapest, Hungarian Church History Encyclopaedia Working Group	1999	
Imre Tempfli – Ferenc Sipos	Writers-Priests of Szatmár Roman Catholic Diocese / A szatmári római katolikus egyházmegye író papjai	Szatmárnémeti	2000	
István Ivancsó	Small Lexicon of Greek Catholic Liturgy / Görög katolikus liturgikus kislexikon	Nyíregyháza, Saint Athanasius Greek Catholic Theological College	2001	
Battista Mondin	Encyclopaedia of Popes / Pápák encikklopédiája	Budapest, Saint Stephen Society	2001	
Mihály Kránitz – Tibor Görföl	Lexicon of Theologians / Teológusok lexikona	Budapest, Osiris Publishing	2002	
Mihály Tóth-Szöllős (ed.)	Evangelical Portrait Hall / Evangélikus arcképcsarnok	Budapest, Evangelical Press	2002	medit.lutheran.hu
Antal Gyergyel	Who’s Who in Mythology / Ki kicsoda a mitológiában	Budapest, Anno Publisher	2002	
Jean-Christophe Attias – Esther Benbassa	Lexicon of Jewish Culture / A zsidó kultúra lexikona	Budapest, Balassi Publishing	2003	
Margit Beke	Archbishops of Esztergom 1001–2003 / Esztergomi érsekek 1001–2003	Budapest, Saint Stephen Society	2003	
László Vanyó	Lexicon of Early Christian Writers / Ókeresztény írók lexikona	Budapest, Saint Stephen Society	2004	
Wolfgang Beinert	Lexicon of Catholic Dogmatics / A katolikus dogmatika lexikona	Budapest, Vigilia Publishing	2004	
Máté Botos	Concept Dictionary of Christian Culture / A keresztény kultúra fogalomtára	Budapest, Jel Publisher	2006	
Róbert Simon	Torchbearers of Humanity: Saints, Teachers, and Masters / Az emberiség fáklyavivői. Szentek, tanítók és mesterek lexikonja (2 vols)	Budapest, Etalon Publishing	2007–2015	
Margit Beke	Clergy of the Esztergom (Esztergom-Budapest) Archdiocese 1892–2006 / Az esztergomi (esztergom-budapesti) főegyházmegye papsága 1892–2006	Budapest, Saint Stephen Society	2008	
Rupert Berger (ed.)	Pastoral Liturgical Lexicon / Lelkipásztori liturgikus lexikon	Budapest, Vigilia Publishing	2009	
Róbert Simon	Islamic Cultural Lexicon / Iszlám kulturális lexikon	Budapest, Corvina Publisher	2009	
Péter Máté-Tóth (ed.)	World Religions – Academic Lexicon A–ZS / Világvallások – Akadémiai lexikon A–ZS	Budapest, Akadémiai Kiadó	2009	
Sándor Ferenczi	Historical Register of the Gyulafehérvár (Transylvanian) Diocese / A gyulafehérvári (erdélyi) főegyházmegye történeti névtára	Budapest–Kolozsvár, Saint Stephen Society–Verbum	2009	
Reinhard Barth	Popes from Saint Peter to Benedict XVI / Pápák – Szent Pétertől XVI. Benedekig	Pécs, Alexandra Publishing	2010	
Tamás Véghseő	Historical Register of Greek Catholic Priests / Görögkatolikus papok történeti névtára	Nyíregyháza	2015	REAL-MTAK

=== Music / Zene ===
Author, editor	Title	Place of publication, publisher	Release year	Electronic contact
editor József Ságh	Hungarian Lexicon of Music (Magyar zenészeti lexikon)	Budapest	1880	MEK
Miklós Markó	Album of Gypsy Musicians (Czigányzenészek albuma)	Budapest, self-published (facsimile: Fekete Sas Publishing)	1896 (2006)	
Farkas Kálmán	Singing Lexicon, Description of All Hungarian Song Collections Published Until 1711 (Éneklexikon, az 1711-ig magyarul megjelent összes énekgyűjtemények ismertetése)	manuscript	ca. 1900	
Albert Siklós	Albert Siklós Music Lexicon (Siklós Albert zenei lexikona)	Budapest, Károly Rozsnyai Publishing	1922	
editors Bence Szabolcsi – Aladár Tóth	Music Lexicon (Zenei lexikon) (2 volumes)	Budapest, Andor Győző Publishing	1931	
Gyula Salgó – Döme Lugosi	Opera and Ballet Pocket Lexicon (Opera és balett zseblexikon)	Szeged, Bartos Printing	1933	
Géza Falk	Small Music Lexicon (Zenei kislexikon)	Budapest, Ferenc Bárd and Son Publishing	1938	
editor Viktor Géza Lányi	Hungária Music Lexicon (Hungária zenei lexikon)	Budapest, Hungária Publishing	1944	Arcanum
chief editor Dénes Bartha	Music Lexicon (Zenei lexikon) (3 volumes)	Budapest, Zeneműkiadó Vállalat	1965	
Péter Tardos	Beat Small Lexicon (Beat kislexikon)	Budapest, Zeneműkiadó Vállalat	1971	
Gábor Darvas	Mini Music Lexicon (Zenei minilexikon)	Budapest, Zeneműkiadó Vállalat	1974	
Péter Várnai	Opera Lexicon (Operalexikon)	Budapest, Zeneműkiadó Vállalat	1975	
Gábor Darvas	Pocket Music Lexicon (Zenei zseblexikon)	Budapest, Zeneműkiadó Vállalat	1978, 1982, 1987	
Péter Tardos	Rock Lexicon (Rocklexikon)	Budapest, Zeneműkiadó Vállalat	1980, expanded 1982	
editors Gábor Szántó – György Czippán	Who’s Who in Foreign Rock Music? (Ki kicsoda a külföldi rockzenében?)	Budapest, Youth Paper and Book Publishing Co.	1982	
editors Gábor Szántó – György Czippán	Who’s Who in Hungarian Rock Music? (Ki kicsoda a magyar rockzenében?)	Budapest, Youth Paper and Book Publishing Co.	1982	
Hugo Riemann – Heinz Alfred Brockhaus	Music Lexicon (Zenei lexikon) (3 volumes)	Budapest, Zeneműkiadó Vállalat	1985	
multiple authors	Popular Music Lexicon (Könnyűzenei lexikon)	Budapest, Tourism and Publishing Co.	1985	
József Leszler	For Song Enthusiasts (Nótakedvelőknek)	Budapest, Zeneműkiadó	1986	
Walter Kolneder	Bach Lexicon (Bach-lexikon)	Budapest, Gondolat Publishing	1988	
editor András Székely	Who’s Who in Hungarian Music Life? (Ki kicsoda a magyar zeneéletben?)	Budapest, Zeneműkiadó	1979, expanded 1988	
editors János Boris – Colin Larkin	Guinness Jazz Musicians Lexicon (Guinness Jazz-zenészek lexikona)	Budapest, Kossuth Publishing	1993	
Tivadar Kikli	Lexicon of Hungarian Songwriters, Singers and Folk Musicians (Magyarnótaszerzők, Énekesek és Népdalosok Lexikona) (2 volumes)	Szeged, Bába and Partners	1999–2004	
Frigyes Frideczky	Hungarian Composers (Magyar zeneszerzők)	Budapest, Athenaeum Publishing	2000	
István Balázs	High School Music Lexicon (Középiskolai zenei lexikon)	Budapest, Corvina Publishing	2000	
Dorottya Berkiné Szalóczy	Small Music Lexicon (Zenei kislexikon)	Budapest, Fiesta Studio Publishing Ltd.	2001	
Tamás Hölzer	Entertaining Music Lexicon (Szórakoztató zenei lexikon)	Budapest, Enciklopédia Publishing	2003	
Attila Törőcsik	Lexicon of Musical Instruments (Hangszerek kislexikona)	H. n., Saxum Publishing	2003	
István Balázs	Music Lexicon (Zenei lexikon)	Budapest, Corvina Publishing	2005, expanded 2017	
Péter Szalóczy	Forgotten Composers (Elfeledett zeneszerzők)	Budapest, Typotex Publishing	2007	
Erzsébet Szikszayné Dobronyi	Small Music Lexicon (Zenei kislexikon)	Budapest, Aquila Publishing	2007	
editors Attila Nádori – János Szirányi	Classical Composers – Britannica Hungarica Mini Encyclopedia (Klasszikus zeneszerzők – Britannica Hungarica kisenciklopédia)	Budapest, Kossuth Publishing	2014	
multiple authors	Progressive Music Lexicon (Progresszív zenei lexikon)	Budapest, Kornétás Publishing and Trade Ltd.	2015	

=== Lexicon on other topics / Egyéb témakörű lexikonok ===
Author, editor	Title	Place of publication, publisher	Release year	Electronic contact
Károly Oleják	Firefighters Lexicon (Tűzoltó lexikon)	Budapest, Pesti Könyvnyomda Rt.	1904	
editor Gyula Hajós	Tourist Lexicon (Turista lexikon)	Budapest, Pallas Literary and Printing Co.	1932	
editors Andor Tiszay – Géza Falk	Radio Listeners’ Lexicon (2 volumes) (Rádióhallgatók lexikona)	Budapest, Vajda-Wichmann Publishing	1944	
Viktor Szondy – Endre Jónás	Diplomatic Lexicon (Diplomáciai lexikon)	Budapest, Andor Kulcsár Printing	1947	
editor Gyula Hajdú	Lexicon of Diplomacy and International Law (Diplomáciai és nemzetközi jogi lexikon)	Budapest, Akadémiai	1959	
editor Gyula Hajdú	Lexicon of Diplomacy and International Law (Diplomáciai és nemzetközi jogi lexikon)	Budapest, Akadémiai; 2nd revised edition	1967	
György Fodor	Small Lexicon of Units of Measurement (Mértékegység kislexikon)	Budapest, Műszaki Könyvkiadó	1971	
Imre Zala	Book A-Z. Lexicon of the Book Trade (Könyv A-Z. A könyvkereskedelem kislexikona)	Budapest, Tankönyvkiadó	1973	MEK
chief editor László Helm	Small Lexicon of Measurement Technology (Méréstechnikai kislexikon)	Budapest, Műszaki Könyvkiadó	1976	
multiple authors	Game Lexicon (Játéklexikon)	Budapest, Youth Paper and Book Publishing Co.	1984	
chief editor Ágnes Kenyeres	Cultural Mini Encyclopedia (Kulturális kisenciklopédia)	Budapest, Kossuth Publishing	1986	
Miklós Vértesy	Librarians’ Lexicon (Könyvtárosok kislexikona)	Budapest, Múzsák Cultural Publishing	1987	
István Gazda – Andor Bér – Barna Fogarasi	Stamp Lexicon (Bélyeglexikon)	Budapest, Gondolat Publishing	1988	
editor László Csizmadia	Gastronomy Lexicon (Gasztronómiai lexikon)	Budapest, Mezőgazda Publishing	1992	
chief editor Mihály Berend	Card Games Lexicon (Kártyalexikon)	Budapest, Akadémiai Publishing	1993, 2008	
György Fodor	Lexicon of Units of Measurement (Mértékegység-lexikon)	Budapest, Műszaki Könyvkiadó	1994	
László Gy. Horváth – Hedvig Turai	Japanese Cultural Lexicon (Japán kulturális lexikon)	Budapest, Corvina Publishing Ltd.	1999	
Claudia Wisniewski	Fashion Lexicon (Divatlexikon)	Budapest, Athenaeum 2000 Publishing	2001	
editor Miklós Kaposy	Humor Lexicon (Humorlexikon)	Budapest, Tarsoly Publishing	2001	
Péter Ádám	French-Hungarian Cultural Dictionary (Francia-magyar kulturális szótár)	Budapest, Corvina Publishing Ltd.	2005	
editors Iván Bába – János Sáringer	Diplomatic Lexicon (Diplomáciai lexikon)	Budapest, Éghajlat	2018	MTAK

== Sources ==
- Kosáry Domokos: Bevezetés Magyarország történetének forrásaiba és irodalmába I., Tankönyvkiadó, Budapest, 1970, 119–123. o.
- Petrik Géza: Magyarország bibliographiája 1712–1860 I–IV., Budapest, 1888–1892
- Petrik Géza: Jegyzéke az 1860–1875. években megjelent magyar könyvek- és folyóiratoknak, Budapest, 1888–1892
- Kiszlingstein Sándor: Magyar könyvészet 1876–1885, Budapest, 1890
- Petrik Géza: Magyar Könyvészet 1886–1900. I–II. Az 1886–1900. években megjelent magyar könyvek, térképek és atlaszok összeállítása tudományos szak- és tárgymutatóval. A könyvek betűsoros jegyzéke, térképek és atlaszok, a szerzők névmutatója; Budapest, 1913
- Petrik Géza – Barcza Imre: Az 1901–1910. években megjelent magyar könyvek, folyóiratok, atlaszok és térképek összeállítása tudományos folyóiratok repertóriumával, Budapest, 1917–1928
- Kozocsa Sándor: Magyar Könyvészet 1911–1920 (I–II.), Budapest, 1939–1942
- Komjáthy Miklósné (szerk.) – Kertész Gyula (szerk.): Magyar könyvészet 1921–1944. I–XII. – A Magyarországon nyomtatott könyvek szakosított jegyzéke, Országos Széchenyi Könyvtár, 1984–1992

== Other external reference ==
- Kézikönyvtár | Arcanum

== Other articles ==
- List of encyclopedias by language
