= List of old Latin lexicons published in Hungary =

The list below tries to collect, in chronological order, the major lexicons written in Latin that have been published in Hungary, standalone or translated. The lexicons in Hungarian in Hungary are discussed in the article List of encyclopedias in Hungarian. As Latin was the official state language in Hungary both in the Middle Ages and later (until 1844), many works, including lexicons, were published in Latin.

Author, editor	Title	Place of publication, for rent	Date of publication	Electronic contact
Hevenesi Gábor	Ungaricae Sanctitatis Indicia ('The glass cabinet of the Hungarian saints')	Nagyszombat	1692	Google Books
Czvittinger Dávid	Specimen Hungariae literatae ('An attempt to summarize Hungarian scholarship')	Frankfurt–Lipcse	1711	Google Books
the author's name is unknown	Acta Sanctorum Ungariae I–II.	Nagyszombat	1749	Google Books I., II.
Szörény Sándor	Pannonia docta	it did not appear in print, it is still in manuscript		
Andreas Schmal	Brevis de vita superintendentium evangelicorum in Hugaria commentatio	?	this 18th century work was published in Hungarian only much later, in 1861	
Andreas Schmal	Syllabus litterarum Thurocziensium	?	this 18th century work was published in Hungarian only much later, in part only 1862	
Adalbert Barits	Scriptorum ex regno Slavoniae a saeculo XIV. usque ad XVII. inclusive collectio	Varasd	1774	
Weszprémi István	Succincta medicorum Hungariae et Transilvaniae biographie I–III. ('A short biography of doctors from Hungary and Transylvania')	Lipcse–Bécs	1774–1787	Google Books I–II., III.
Horányi Elek	Memoria Hungarorum et Provincialium scriptis editis notorum I–III.	Bécs	1775–1777	Google Books I., II., III.
Georg Jeremias Haner	Scriptores rerum Hungaricarum et Transilvanicarum I–II.	Bécs–Nagyszeben	1777–1798	
Horányi Elek	Nova Memoria Hungarorum et provincialium scriptis editis notorum quam excitat…	Pest	1792	Google Books I.
Horányi Elek	Scriptores Piarum Scholarum liberaliumque artium magistri quorum ingenii monumenta exhibet I–II.	Buda	1808–1809	Google Books I. II.
Joannes Josephus Roth	De scriptoribus rerum Transilvanicarum Saxonicis dissertatio	Nagyszeben	1816	
Horváth István	Lexicon Eruditorum Regni Hungariae	it did not appear in print, it is still in manuscript		
Gedeon László	Musae Varadienses	it did not appear in print, it is still in manuscript		
Seraphinus Farkas	Scriptores ord. min. S. P. Francisci provinciae Hungariae	Pozsony	1879	
Némethy Lajos	Series parochiarum et parochorum archi-dioecesis Strigoniensis ab antiquissimis temporibus usque annum 1894	Esztergom	1894	Bayerische StaatsBibliothek

== See also ==
- List of encyclopedias in Hungarian
- List of encyclopedias in Latin
- List of encyclopedias by language

== Sources ==
- Kosáry Domokos: Bevezetés Magyarország történetének forrásaiba és irodalmába I., Tankönyvkiadó, Budapest, 1970, 119–123. o.
