= A Repository of Modern Knowledge =

6-volume encyclopedia, published 1850–1855

- Original title: Ujabb kori ismeretek tára
- Country: Hungary
- Language: Hungarian
- Published: 1850-1855
- No. of books: six

A Repository of Modern Knowledge: (Hungarian: Ujabb kori ismeretek tára), subtitled an Encyclopedia of Sciences and Political Social Life (Hungarian: Tudományok és politikai társas élet encyclopædiája) is a Hungarian lexicon published in the middle of the 19th century.

== History ==
The large-scale work, published by Gusztáv Heckenast in Pest between 1850 and 1855, processed the various branches of knowledge in six volumes. There is still no facsimile edition of the work, but the volumes are available in electronic form free of charge from Google Books, cf. below.

== Order of volumes ==
Number	Title (Document)	Publication Year	Number of pages
I	Aargau – Brockhaus	1850	684
II	Brodzinszky-Ehrenfels	1850	666
III	Eichendorff – Girardin	1851	666
IV	Girod de l'Ain – Kazan	1852	672
V	Kazinczy – Pauperismus	1853	664
VI	Paxton – Zürich	1855	627
