= Catholic Lexicon =

Early 20th century Hungarian lexicon

The Catholic Lexicon (Hungarian: Katolikus lexikon) is a large-scale Hungarian lexicon of the early 20th century.

== History ==
The work, made by several authors, was published in 4 volumes between 1931 and 1933 in Budapest by Magyar Kultúra. It has a total size of about 2100 pages. The volumes contain biographies of a large number of Christian persons, definition of religion, or a concept related to religion. The illustration is aided by black and white and color illustrations. There is no facsimile edition of the work, but it is available in electronic form at the website of Arcanum Kft.

== Order of volumes ==
Volume number	Volume title	Number of pages	Year of publication	Link
Volume I	Aachen–Elkeresztelés	528	1931	
Volume II	Ellenállás–Kazula	532	1931	
Volume III	Kazy–Péter	544	1932	
Volume IV	Péter–Zype. + Appendix	528	1933	

== Sources ==
- Volumes of the lexicon
- Digitized edition
