= Hungarian Catholic Lexicon =

The Hungarian Catholic Lexicon (Hungarian: Magyar katolikus lexikon) is a large-scale lexicon series in Hungarian, dealing mainly with religious topics.

== History and content ==
Regarding the history of the Lexicon, the editors note the following in the preface to the first volume:

In 1980, Szent István Társulat Könyvkiadó undertook to publish the Hungarian Catholic Lexicon. At first, it seemed a solution to shorten the 10-volume material of the famous Lexikon für Theologie und Kirche, published in 1957–65, and to supplement it with Hungarian material. However, examination of the glossary prepared as a first step revealed that this path was impossible. The Lexikon für Theologie und Kirche was born in a German cultural circle (and schools), was made for people raised in the traditions of this cultural circle, and its approach, references, attachments and examples cannot be transposed by simple translation. Coordinating the work of translators of different qualifications, proofreading, discussions arising from misunderstandings ... etc.

The editors intended to emphasize topics related to the Hungarian church in particular. Under the editorship of István Diós and János Viczián, the Hungarian Lexicon was thus prepared independently of the Lexikon für Theologie and Kirche, and includes a range of items relating to local history, ethnography, botany, and music history.

The Lexicon, which was published in 15 volumes between 1993 and 2010 and comprises around 15,000 printed pages, was carried out under the auspices of the Szent István Társulat (St. Stephen Society), which has traditionally published ecclesiastical literature. The two-column text is decorated with many black and white and some color photographs and illustrations. In 2013, an additional volume (A–Zs) was published as the 16th, and then in 2014 the series was closed by an index volume (volume 17).

The most important of the topics covered by the encyclopedia are the followingː

- biographies (popes, kings, bishops, writers, other personalities)
- events (Hungarian ecclesiastical and secular history, universal church history)
- places (countries, dioceses, Hungarian dioceses, parishes, pilgrimage sites, monastic houses)
- institutions (monastic orders, associations)
- concepts (philosophy, scripture, dogmatics, ecclesiastical law, liturgy, arts, natural sciences)

In addition to the printed edition, the Hungarian Catholic Lexicon has also been available in electronic form. András Rácz, a student of the Faculty of Information Technology of the Pázmány Péter Catholic University, took part in the creation of the Internet version, under the supervision of Miklós Pásztor.

== Order of volumes ==
Volume number	Volume title	Year of publication	Number of pages
Volume I	A–Bor	1993	948
Volume II	Bor–Éhe	1996	964
Volume III	Éhi–Gar	1997	932
Volume IV	Gas–Hom	1998	932
Volume V	Homo–J	2000	978
Volume VI	Kaán–Kiz	2001	970
Volume VII	Klacs–Lond	2002	1040
Volume VIII	Lone–Meszl	2003	1056
Volume IX	Meszr–Olt	2004	1056
Volume X	Oltal–Pneu	2005	1022
Volume XI	Pob–Sep	2006	1020
Volume XII	Seq–Szentl	2007	1018
Volume XIII	Szentl–Titán	2008	1000
Volume XIV	Titel–Veszk	2009	1008
Volume XV	Veszp–Zs	2010	750
Volume XVI	Pótkötet A–Zs	2013	1030
Volume XVII	Indexkötet. Az I–XVI. kötet mutatója A–Zs	2014	1212

== Sources ==
- Diós, István; Viczián, János, eds. (1993–2010). Magyar katolikus lexikon I–XV. Budapest: Szent István Társulat.
