= Life and works of Hungarian writers (Szinnyei) =

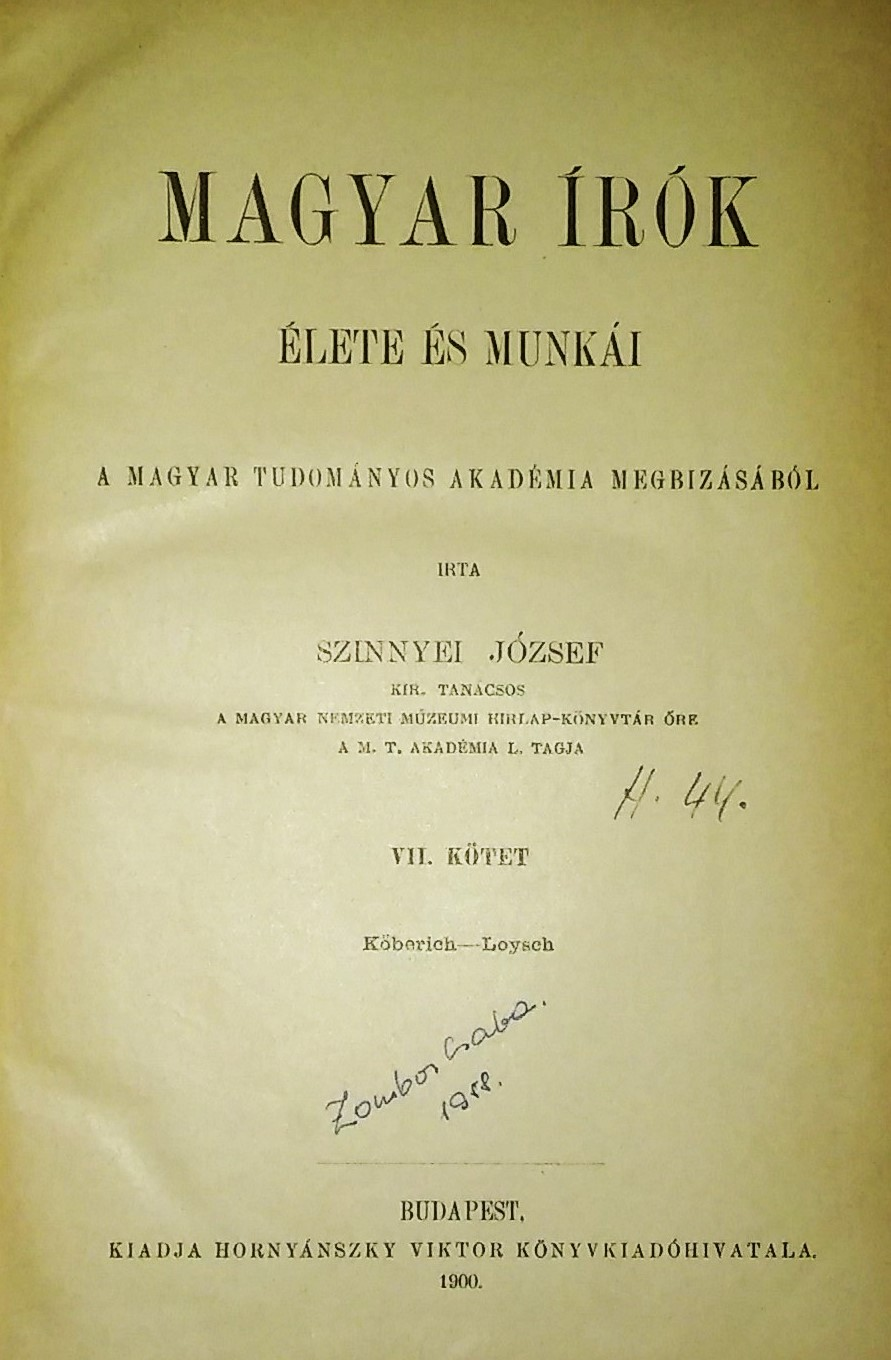

The Life and works of Hungarian writers (in Hungarian Magyar írók élete és munkái) is a lexicon of Hungarian literature written at the turn of the century by József Szinnyei. The 14-volume work, published between 1891 and 1914, sought to bring together all those who had published a literary work published (or left in manuscript) in their hands. The life and work of Hungarian writers is still a masterpiece and one of the greatest simple literary works.

== The concept ==
After 30 years of research (1860–1890), the author published a work of about 5,200 pages in 24 years (1891–1914), processing the biographies and works of nearly 30,000 Hungarian writers. With the exception of Pál Gulyás' later (unfinished) supplementary series (The Life and Works of Hungarian Writers – New Series), it is still the largest and most detailed scientific work in its field.

He included the old Hungarian (national) authors and his contemporaries, including publishers in foreign languages (Latin, German, Slovak, Romanian, etc.), ethnic and "Hungarianized" authors. Due to the conditions of the age and the author's career, all this must be understood within the broad framework of historical Hungary (Greater Hungary).

== History ==
Szinnyei was a significant bibliographer and librarian of the second half of the 19th century, who, from a young age of 1860, collected the data for the design of a hopeful great Hungarian literary lexicon. By 1877, such a large amount of material had been collected that Szinnyei submitted his application to the Hungarian Academy of Sciences in connection with his work. The Academy postponed the publication due to financial problems, and it was not until after Szinnyei's further application in 1885 and 1886 that he decided on financial support in 1889, but did not undertake to publish the work.

The author finally signed a contract with the academic bookstore of Viktor Hornyánszky, and the first booklets of the first volume may have been published as early as 1890. By this time Szinnyei was already 60 years old, but with almost renewed vigor he began to settle his notes. The full series eventually appeared in 14 volumes in 24 years. The author did not reach the end of the main work of his life: he died in 1913 at the age of 83. The last volume was published only one year after his death, in 1914, with the help of his son, Ferenc Szinnyei.

== Description ==
In the lexicon, the author collected the biographical and literary data of 29,553 Hungarian writers in a broader sense (ie not only fiction writers) on about 10,500 columns, ie about 5,250 two-column pages. The various name variations / changes, resp. due to misspellings and other errors, the number of people involved is a few hundred smaller.

He spoke more about the more famous writers, narrowing down the biographical data of those classified as less significant, but paying close attention to the completeness of the titles of their independently published works. He developed his biographies in the same process: he published the most important events of the writers' careers, listed their journal and newspaper articles, compiled a list of addresses of their independently published works, and finally reported on his sources. He used the material of the previous bibliographers carefully, and for the newer literature he adapted to the data of museum books, newspapers, magazines, obituaries, and CVs.

== Reprint ==
The work also has a reprint (Association of Hungarian Publishers and Distributors, Veszprém, 1981) and an electronic edition courtesy of the Hungarian Electronic Library.

== Order of volumes ==
Volume Number	Volume title	Year of publication	Number of columns	Electronic access
Volume I	Aachs–Bzenszki	1891	1440 columns	
Volume II	Caban–Exner	1893	1474 columns	
Volume III	Fa–Gwóth	1894	1582 columns	
Volume IV	Gyalai–Hyrtl	1896	1492 columns	
Volume V	Iczés–Kempner	1897	1468 columns	
Volume VI	Kende–Kozocsa	1899	1456 columns	
Volume VII	Köberich–Loysch	1900	1440 columns	
Volume VIII	Löbl–Minnich	1902	1446 columns	
Volume IX	Mircse–Oszvaldt	1903	1450 columns	
Volume X	Ótócska–Popea	1905	1440 columns	
Volume XI	Popeszku–Rybay	1906	1430 columns	
Volume XII	Saád–Steinensis	1908	1438 columns	
Volume XIII	Steiner–Télfy	1909	1440 columns	
Volume XIV	Telgárti–Zsutai	1914	1958 columns	

== Sources ==
- Magyar katolikus lexikon I–XV. Főszerk. Diós István; szerk. Viczián János. Budapest: Szent István Társulat. 1993–2010. Magyar írók élete és munkái
- Petrik Géza: Magyar könyvészet 1886–1910, Budapest, 1913–1928 ,
- Pintér Jenőː A magyar irodalom története: tudományos rendszerezés, I–VIII. kötet, Budapest, 1930–1941. (elektronikus elérésː http://mek.oszk.hu/15300/15384/index.phtml)
- Szinnyei, József (2000), Magyar írók élete és munkái [Life and Works of Hungarian Writers] (in Hungarian), Budapest: Arcanum, ISBN 978-9638602992
