= A Franklin kézi lexikona =

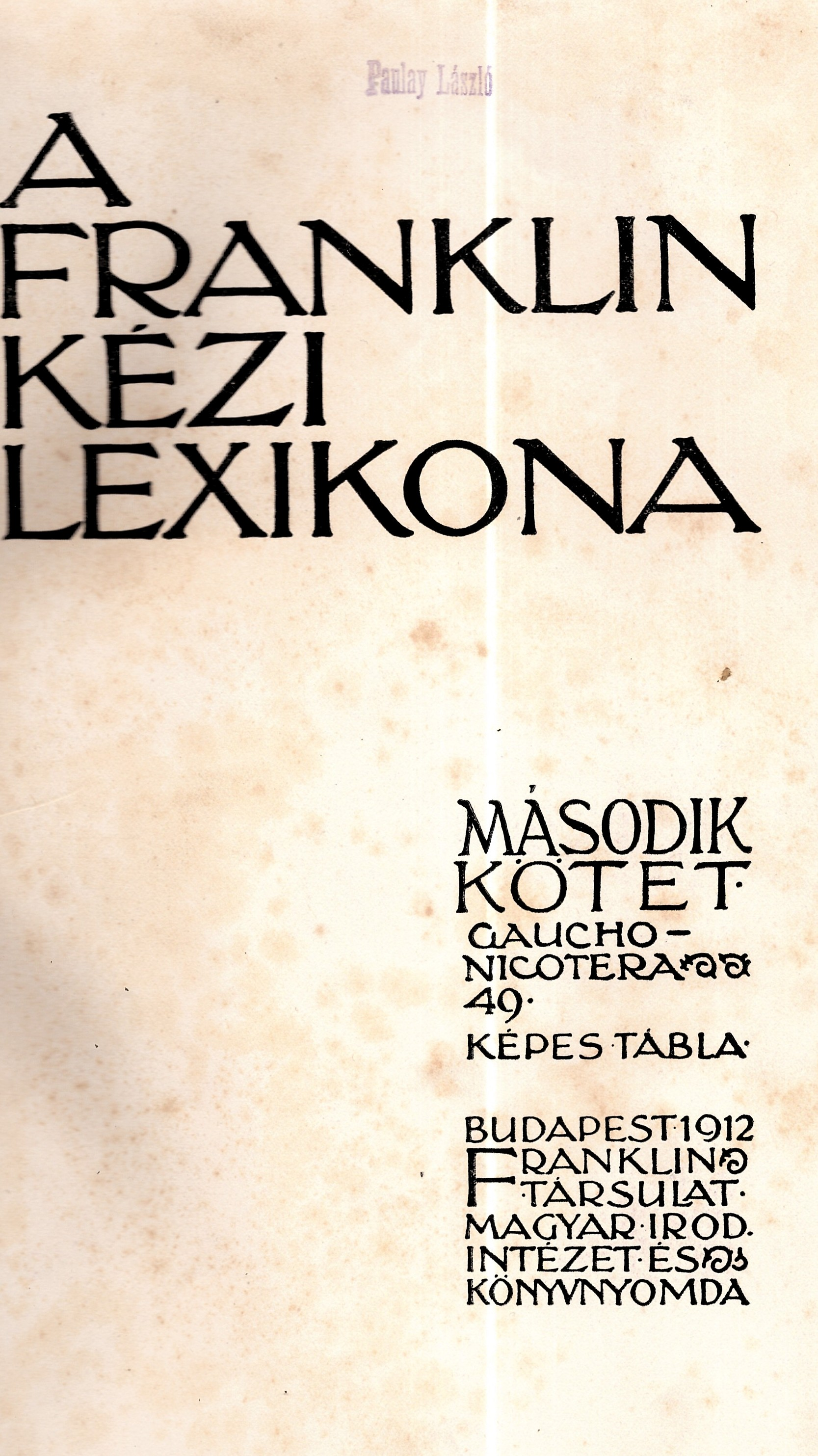
Volume 2 cover page

A Franklin kézi lexikona (actually the Franklin Company Publisher's Hand Lexicon) a larger handbook in Hungarian published at the beginning of the 20th century.

== Description ==
The editors-in-chief Antal Radó, Béla Fábián, and Antal Almási were the editors of the work, which was published in 3 large volumes – 28x20 cm – in a volume of about 2,900 pages. The edition is published by the Franklin Company Hungarian Office. He graduated from the Institute and Book Printing House in Budapest in 1911–1912. According to the "Preface":

This Lexicon is intended to provide a brief overview of all that interests the average literate reader. It mainly takes into account the needs of the newspaper-reading audience, which very often needs a handbook that can provide explanations and guidance on the many kinds of names, data and events that occur in the newspapers; in addition, he also pays attention to the youth of the pupil, who also needs such help very often during his readings. We give a Handheld Lexicon, not a large knowledge base of many volumes. We do this because such a lexicon is not available on the Hungarian book market now, although in everyone's experience, such a lexicon is most needed. In ninety out of a hundred cases, the audience does not turn to a lexicon to thoroughly master a science or knowledge, but to understand a word, a phrase that is unknown to it before, to get the data they suddenly need, to learn the most important thing about a character, whose name just appears before him, and so on. Readers like this don't even like to have to fish out what they need at that minute from a small study of 10–20 columns first; a Hand Lexicon is much more appropriate for their purpose, since we can see in reality that such foreign lexicons have the greatest popularity in foreign literature than the most important disseminators of enlightenment, even for cheaper goods.

That is, the publisher, true to the title, published a larger general hand lexicon for the lexicon series of the period (A Pallas nagy lexikona, Révai Nagy Lexikona, World lexicon of Tolnai) compared.

Each volume appeared in an Art Nouveau backbone binding. There were at least 4 types of binding: Art Nouveau brown, eclectic brown , Art Nouveau green, and Art Nouveau blue.

== Contemporary reception ==
The reception of the work may have been favorable due to the publisher's reputation for publishing quality books, but a critical one remained in the magazine Nyugat . Miksa Fenyő expressed his disapproval of the fact that significant historical figures and notions of his concept "no" appear in the volumes: "" there was a special committee of forty scientists – which was deliberately omitted, which was taken: it bears the stamp of Slendrianism, fair work, scientific unscrupulousness. ” Some of the missing articles: golden wool, aphorism, hedonism, affair, amen, aven, avas, number, letter, judge, idol, biography; and – now partly forgotten – names: Fra Bartolomeo, Francesco da Negroponte, Pietro Longhi, JP Laurens, Van Gogh, Albert Besnard, TT Heine, Ferdinand V. Keller, Alfred Messel, Miczbán, Karacsay Codex, Lukács Enyedy, Sándor Csizmadia, Beck Ö. Philippines, Kaffka Margit. He also saw that 'the explanations of Franklin's hand-held lexicon are dressed-up, confusing and inadequate, and even in headlines where it can't be spoiled, so to speak, because listing some dry data is sufficient, even there with unnecessary inadequacy. "

== Occurrence today ==
The series has not been published in a facsimile or electronic edition to date. It is relatively common in antique shops, however, it also searched auctions.

== Picture attachments ==
Volume I 41, Volume II. 49, a III. and contained 33 color and black-and-white image attachments.

=== Volume I ===
Image attachments: 1. Africa. 2. African Animals (color). 3. Brain and spinal cord. 4. North America. 5. South America and Antilles. 6. American Animals (color). 7. Australia. 8. Australian Animals (color). 9. Car and motorcycle. 10. Asia. 11. Asian Animals (color). 12. Bacteria (colored). 13. Mining. 14. Astronomy. 15. Sugar production. 16. Color Decorations (color) 17. Electricity I. 18. Electricity II. 19. Electricity III. 20. Human dissection I. 21. Human dissection II. 22. Human-autopsy III. 23. Human-autopsy IV. 24. Human races I. 25. Human races II. 26. Architecture I. 27. Architecture II. 28. Architecture III. 29. Architecture IV. 30. Sensory organs. 31. Europe. 32. Developmental science. 33. Photography I. 34. Photography II. 35. Painting I. 36. Painting II. 37. Painting III. 38. Painting IV. 39. Painting V. 40. Painting VI. 41. Painting VII. Text Appendices: 1. Public Finances and Debt 2. Austria 3. United States 4. Human Races and Languages 5. Discoveries and Inventions 6. Paths of Discovery 7. Agriculture and Livestock 8. France

=== Volume II ===
Image attachments: 1. Mushrooms (colored). 2. Steam engines. 3. Steam boilers. 4. Steam turbines. 5. Warships. 6. Shipping. 7. Hangtan. 8. Musical instruments. I. 9. Musical instruments. II. 10. Hidak. I. 11. Bridges II. 12. Cold store plants (colored). 13. Heat. 14. Applied arts. I. Clay industry. 15. Applied arts. II. Clay and glass industry. 16. Applied arts. III. Furniture industry. I. 17. Applied arts. ARC. Furniture industry. II. 18. Applied arts. V. Goldsmiths. 19. Applied arts. VI. Textile industry. 20. Writing. 21. Potassium salt mining. 22. Crystal shapes. 23. Crystallized minerals. 24. Air navigation. 25. Hungarian decorations (color). 26. Hungarian Applied arts. I. Clay industry. 27. Hungarian Applied Arts. II. Furniture industry. 28. Hungarian Applied Arts. III. Goldsmiths. 29. Hungarian Applied Arts. ARC. Textile industry. 30. Hungarian Art. I. Architecture. I. 31. Hungarian Art. II. Architecture. II. 32. Hungarian Art. III. Painting. I. 33. Hungarian Art. ARC. Painting. II. 34. Hungarian Art. V. Painting. III. 35. Hungarian Art. VI. Painting. ARC. 36. Hungarian Art. VII. Sculpture I. 37. Hungarian Art. VIII. Sculpture II. 38. Hungarian Costumes. I. (color) 39. Hungarian Costumes. II. (colored) 40. Mechanics. I. 41. Mechanics. II. 42. Greenhouse plants (colored). 43. Poisonous plants. I. (color) 44. Poisonous plants. II. (color) 45. Agricultural machinery. I. 46. Agricultural machinery. II. 47. Agricultural machinery. III. 48. Motors (Electric motors). 49. Job transfer. (Electronic). Text annexes: 1. Steam shipping 2. Japan 3. China 4. Hungary's trade and industry 5. Main statistics on Hungary's transport 6. Hungary's public education 7. Hungary's population 8. Measures 9. Great Britain and Ireland 10. German Empire

=== Volume III ===
Picture attachments: 1. Botany. I. 2. Botany. II. 3. Botany. III. 4. Capital letters. 5. Optics. I. 6. Optics. II. 7. Prehistory. I. 8. Prehistory. II. 9. Airplanes. 10. Insects I. 11. Insects. II. 12. Brewing. 13. Manufacture of spirits. 14. Theater. I. 15. Theater. II. 16. Sculpture. I. 17. Sculpture. II. 18. Sculpture. III. 19. Weaving industry. 20. Telegraph and telephone. I. 21. Telegraph and telephone. II. 22. Telegraph and telephone. III. 23. Glass painting (color). 24. Vasipar. 25. Vasutak. I. 26. Vasutak. II. 27. Vasutak. III. 28. Chemical apparatus. I. 29. Chemical apparatus. II. 30. Blood (colored). 31. Lighting. 32. Costumes from antiquity (color). 33. Costumes from the 17th and 18th centuries (color). Text annexes: 1. Italy 2. Russian Empire 3. Popes 4. Portugal 5. Romania 6. Proliferation of religions on earth 7. Length of railways by country, ie at the end of 1909 8. Spain 9. Switzerland 10. Turkish Empire 11. World literature

== Order of volumes ==
Volume Number	Volume title	Year of publication	Number of pages
I.	A–Gátvíz	1911	1020
II.	Gaucho–Nicotera	1912	956
III.	Niczky–Zsuzsok	1912	976

== Sources ==
- Volumes of Franklin's Hand Lexicon
- Kozocsa Sándor: Magyar Könyvészet 1911–1920 (I–II.), Budapest, 1939–1942 Franklin kézi lexikona. A –. Bp., 1911. Franklin. 4°. 3 köt. | MAGYAR KÖNYVÉSZET 1712–1920 | Kézikönyvtár
- Magyar katolikus lexikon I–XV. Főszerk. Diós István; szerk. Viczián János. Budapest: Szent István Társulat. 1993–2010. kézi lexikon – Magyar Katolikus Lexikon
- Fenyő Miksa kritikája a lexikonról a „Nyugat” című folyóiratban (1912. 11. szám)
