= Hungarian lexicon =

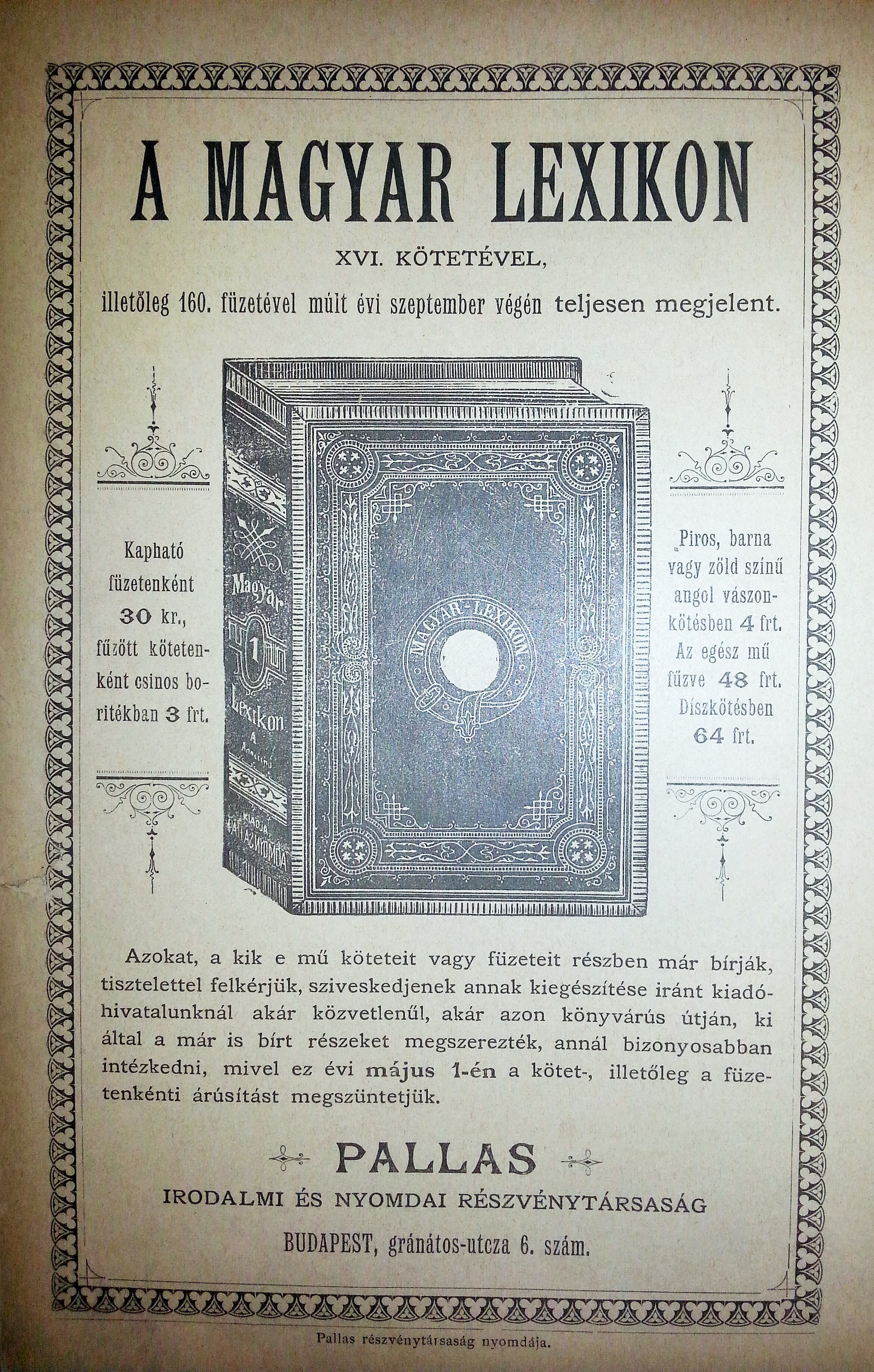
Hungarian lexicon advertisement - Book about the book XIII. vol. 7. no. 1908 The Franklin Society's newsletter

The Hungarian lexicon (Hungarian "Magyar lexikon"), subtitled the encyclopaedia of all sciences (Hungarian "Az összes tudományok encziklopédiája"), was a general Hungarian lexicon.

== History ==
The work appeared in Budapest between 1879 and 1885 in 160 booklets, which were later bound into 16 volumes. (There were also 17 volume versions.) The work contained 160 pictorial appendices. Its editor was Ede Somogyi. A I – XIV. published by Frigyes Rautmann. A XV. volume was published by Lajos Gerő's Publishing Office, the 16th was published by Pallas Literary and Printing Company.

The small-shaped (21 cm x 15 cm) volumes have a total volume of about 10,200 pages. The work is now rare in antique offerings. There is no reprint edition.

== Order of volumes ==
Volume Number	Volume title	Year of publication	Number of pages
Volume I	A–Asuncion	1879	640
Volume II	Asuncion–Banko	1879	631
Volume III	Bankok–Bianchi	1879	640
Volume IV	Bianchi–Bunkócz	1879	640
Volume V	Bunsen–Danhauser	1880	636
Volume VI	Dánia–Encziklopédia	1880	640
Volume VII	Encziklopédisták–Franczia művészet	1880	636
Volume VIII	Franczia nyelv–Haute volée	1881	636
Volume IX	Hautgout–Julianna	1881	636
Volume X	Julianus–Könyvnyomtatás	1882	636
Volume XI	Könyvornamentika–Magyar Tempe	1882	636
Volume XII	Magyar tengermellék–Nogáll	1883	636
Volume XIII	Nogat–Planetarium	1883	636
Volume XIV	Planetoidok–Sopor	1884	624
Volume XV	Sopornya–Vezér	1884	636
Volume XVI	Vézére–Zsuzsok / Appendix: A–Zsuvat	1885	635
