= Life and works of Hungarian writers – new series (Gulyás) =

The Life and Works of Hungarian Writers edited by Pál Gulyás – a new series of a large-scale, broader Hungarian literary lexicon from the first half of the 20th century. Publishing of the work stalled in the 1940s and then resumed in the 1990s. In the early 2000s, due to lack of funds, they stopped publishing again, the remaining (considerable) part is still in manuscript. With its 19 published volumes and manuscripts, it is probably the largest single Hungarian literary work in existence.

== Order of volumes ==
The series, like other contemporary lexicons, uses column numbering instead of a page. On a printed page, the text is divided into two columns, which means that the number of columns is exactly twice the actual number of pages.

Volume Number	Volume title	Year of publication	Number of columns
Volume I	Aaachs – Bálint Rezső	1939	1247
Volume II	Bálint Sándor – Berényi János	1940	1271
Volume III	Berényi János – Bredeczky Sámuel	1941	1271
Volume IV	Brediceanu Kajusz – Czeglédi Rozsika	1942	1271
Volume V	Czeglédy Sándor – Doctor Linda	1943	952
Volume VI	Doctor Sándor – Dzurányi László	1944	422
Volume VII	Ebeczky Béla – Ézsöl Mihály	1990	423
Volume VIII	Fa Imre – Ferényi Antal	1992	939
Volume IX	Ferenczy Tibor – Füzy Zoltán	1992	943
Volume X	Gaál Adorján – Gokler Gyula	1992	994
Volume XI	Golarski Mici – Gyürky Vidor	1992	990
Volume XII	Haader György – Házyné	1993	903
Volume XIII	Häcker Bálint – Hollinger Rudolf	1993	885
Volume XIV	Hollitzer Gyula – Hyrtl József	1993	858
Volume XV	Iacob János – Jürkéné	1993	453
Volume XVI	Kaál Elek – Kovačević, Iovan	1995	1131
Volume XVII	Kovács A. Ödön – Lyka Károly	1995	1307
Volume XVIII	Maácz János – Myskovszky Viktor	1999	1375
Volume XIX	N. Árpádné – Özséb, P[áter]	2002	983

== Sources ==
- Gulyás Pál: Magyar írók élete és munkái – új sorozat, Magyar Könyvtárosok és Levéltárosok Egyesülete, Budapest, 1939–1944, az I. kötet Előszava
- Magyar katolikus lexikon I–XV. Főszerk. Diós István; szerk. Viczián János. Budapest: Szent István Társulat. 1993–2010. Magyar írók élete és munkái
- http://gulyaspal.mtak.hu/
- Nekrológ Viczián János emlékére
- Czigány Lórántː Szinnyei–Gulyás–Viczián; inː Magyar Könyvszemle, 1997/1
- Hanthy Kingaː Gulyás, a világszám. Mire telik a magyar tudomány pénzéből? ; inː Magyar Nemzet, 2003. ápr. 12.
