= List of encyclopedias by language =

This is a list of encyclopedias by language.

== Albanian ==
Encyclopedias written in Albanian.

- Albanian Encyclopedic Dictionary (Albanian: Fjalori Enciklopedik Shqiptar): published by Academy of Sciences of Albania;
  - First Edition (1985; FESH)
  - New Edition (2008/09; Botimi i ri, FESH II)
- Encyclopedia of Yugoslavia (Albanian edition, 1984): the first encyclopedia published in Albanian
- Albanian Wikipedia (Wikipedia shqip)
- Encyclopedia of Albanian Art (Albanian: Enciklopedia e Artit Shqiptar)

== Arabic ==
Encyclopedias written in Arabic.

- Global Arabic Encyclopedia
- King Abdullah Bin Abdulaziz Arabic Health Encyclopedia
- Marefa
- Mawdoo3
- Arabic Wikipedia

== Armenian ==
Encyclopedias written in Armenian.

- Armenian Soviet Encyclopedia
- Armenian Wikipedia
- Western Armenian Wikipedia

== Azerbaijani ==
Encyclopedias written in Azerbaijani.

- Azerbaijani Soviet Encyclopedia
- National Encyclopedia of Azerbaijan
- Azerbaijani Wikipedia
- South Azerbaijani Wikipedia

== Balinese ==
Encyclopedias written in Balinese

- Balinese Wikipedia

== Basque ==
Encyclopedias written in Basque

- Basque Wikipedia
- Auñamendi Eusko Entziklopedia

== Belarusian ==
Encyclopedias written in Belarusian:

- Belarusian Encyclopedia (Беларуская энцыклапедыя; 1996–2004)
- Byelorussian Soviet Encyclopedia (Беларуская савецкая энцыклапедыя; 1969–1976)
- Belarusian Wikipedia
  - Narkamaŭka Belarusian Wikipedia (be.wikipedia.org, Беларуская Вікіпедыя; since 2004)
  - Taraškievica Belarusian Wikipedia (be-tarask.wikipedia.org, Беларуская Вікіпэдыя; since 2004)
- Cities and Villages of Belarus (Гарады і вёскі Беларусі; 2004–2021)
- Collection of Monuments of History and Culture of Belarus (Збор помнікаў гісторыі і культуры Беларусі; 1984–1988)
- Grand Duchy of Lithuania: Encyclopedia (Вялікае Княства Літоўскае (энцыклапедыя); 2005–2010)

== Bengali ==
- Bishwakosh: 22 volumes, edited by Rangalal Mukhopadhyay, Troilokyanath Mukhopadhyay and Nagendranath Basu
- Banglapedia
- Bengali Wikipedia
- Islami Bishwakosh

== Bulgarian ==
Encyclopedias written in Bulgarian.

- Concise Bulgarian Encyclopedia (Кратка българска енциклопедия; 1963–1969)
- Danchovi Bros Bulgarian Encyclopedia (Българска енциклопедия на Братя Данчови; 1936)
- Encyclopedia Bulgaria (1981–1997) (Енциклопедия България)
- Bulgarian Wikipedia (Уикипедия на български език)

== Catalan ==
Encyclopedias written in Catalan.

- Gran Enciclopèdia Catalana (Catalan Encyclopedia)
- Catalan Wikipedia

== Czech ==
List of encyclopedias in Czech

Encyclopedias written in Czech.

- Riegrův slovník naučný (11 volumes, 1860–1874, supplement vol. 1890, online)
- Stručný všeobecný slovník věcný (9 volumes, 1874–1885, online)
- Otto's encyclopedia (Ottův slovník naučný, 28 vols., 1888–1909, 12 supplement vols., Ottův slovník naučný nové doby (incomplete), 1930–1943, volumes 1–28 online)
- Příruční slovník všeobecných vědomostí (2 volumes, 1882–1887, editor Josef Rank, vol 1 online)
- Masarykův slovník naučný (7 volumes, 1925–1933)
- B. Kočího Malý slovník naučný (2 volumes, 1925–1929, online)
- Nový velký ilustrovaný Slovník naučný (22 volumes, 1929–1934, online)
- Komenského slovník naučný (10 volumes, 1937–1938)
- Příruční slovník naučný (PSN, 4 volumes, 1962–1967)
- Malý encyklopedický slovník A-Ž (1 volume, 1972)
- Ilustrovaný encyklopedický slovník (IES, 3 volumes, 1980–1982)
- Malá československá encklopedie (MČSE, 6 volumes, 1984–1987)
- Diderot (8 volumes, 1999–2000)
- Universum (10 volumes, 1999–2001)
- Czech Wikipedia (2002–)

== Danish ==
Encyclopedias written in Danish.

- Den Store Danske Encyklopædi
- Salmonsens Konversationsleksikon
- Danish Wikipedia

== Egyptian Arabic ==
- Egyptian Arabic Wikipedia: a Wikipedia encyclopedia written in Egyptian Arabic language.

== English ==
Encyclopedias written in English.

18th century and earlier

- Cyclopædia, or an Universal Dictionary of Arts and Sciences (1728–1788)
- Lexicon Technicum (1704–1744)

19th century

- Barkham Burroughs' Encyclopaedia (1889), American encyclopedia and miscellany (1889)
- British Encyclopedia, or Dictionary of Arts and Sciences: 1809, 6 volumes
- The Complete Compendium of Universal Knowledge (1891)
- The Domestic Encyclopedia (1802, Am. editions 1803, 1821)
- Encyclopædia Biblica: published in 1899
- Kendal's Pocket Encyclopedia (1802, second edition 1811)
- Low's Encyclopaedia (1805–1811)
- The Minor Encyclopedia (1803)
- New American Cyclopedia (1857–1866)
- Oracle Encyclopædia: five-volume encyclopedia published in 1895

20th and 21st century

- Academic American Encyclopedia (1980)
- American Heritage New Pictorial Encyclopedic Guide to the United States (1965)
- American Peoples Encyclopedia (1948–1976); the 1948 edition was a 20-volume set published by Spencer Press, Inc., marketed by Sears Roebuck and Company; the 1962 edition was a revised 20-volume set published by Grolier Incorporated, and marketed by its subsidiary, The Richards Company, Inc.
- Book of Knowledge (1912)
- Britannica Junior (1934–1984)
- The British Encyclopedia: 1933, 10 volumes
- Cambridge Encyclopedia: one-volume encyclopedia from Cambridge University Press (1913–1978)
- The Canadian Encyclopedia: originally a multi-volume print encyclopedia from Hurtig Publishers focusing on Canadian topics (founded 1985); now a free, online-only publication of the Historica Dominion Institute (since 1985)
- Chambers's Encyclopaedia (1859–1979)
- The Children's Encyclopedia (1908–1964)
- Collier's Encyclopedia (1951–1998)
- Collins Encyclopedia of Scotland: one-volume encyclopedia (1994, 2000)
- Columbia Encyclopedia: one-volume encyclopedia from Columbia University Press (1935–2000; available online)
- Compton's Encyclopedia: 26-volume encyclopedia (1922–2002)
- Dictionary of the Middle Ages (1982–1989)
- Encarta, digital multimedia encyclopedia by Microsoft (1993–2011)
- Encyclopædia Britannica: in print 1768–2010, online since 1994; see also the 1911 Encyclopædia Britannica
- Encyclopædia Britannica Ultimate Reference Suite: available on DVD (2003–2015)
- Encyclopædia Iranica: history and contemporary topics related to Iranian peoples (1985–present)
- Encyclopedia Americana (1829–present; online)
- Encyclopedia Judaica: 26-volume English-language encyclopedia of the Jewish people and Judaism
- Encyclopedia of Associations: also available online as Associations Unlimited (1954)
- An Encyclopaedia of New Zealand: country-specific historical encyclopedia, with contemporary topics (1966)
- Funk & Wagnalls Standard Encyclopedia (1912)
- Global Encyclopedia: Grolier publication during the 1980s
- Grolier Multimedia Encyclopedia (1995)
- Merit Students Encyclopedia (1967–1992)
- New American Desk Encyclopedia: small paperback encyclopedia (1977)
- New International Encyclopaedia (1902–1927)
- The Nuttall Encyclopaedia: 1900
- Pears Cyclopaedia: one-volume encyclopaedia published annually in the United Kingdom (1897–2017)
- The Peoplepedia (1996)
- The Penguin Encyclopedia of Horror and the Supernatural (1986)
- The Poets' Encyclopedia (1979)
- The Random House Encyclopedia: one-volume encyclopedia from Random House (1977, 1983, 1990)
- Volume Library by Southwestern, 3-volume compendium with aspects of dictionary, almanac and encyclopedia (1911–2004)
- World Book Encyclopedia: world's best selling print encyclopedia (1917–present)

21st-century-only

- Banglapedia: national encyclopedia of Bangladesh, available in English and Bengali (since 2003)
- Encyclopedia of Distances: Springer-Verlag 2009
- Encyclopedia of Life: online collaborative encyclopedia intended to document all of the living species known to science (2008)
- Encyclopaedia of Wales: one volume, also available in Welsh (2008)
- National Geographic Encyclopedia of Animals (2006)
- National Geographic Encyclopedia of Space (2004)
- The Penguin Encyclopedia: New Edition: the world at your fingertips. One-volume encyclopedia published by the Penguin Group (2004)
- Te Ara: The Encyclopedia of New Zealand (2001, online since 2005)
- English Wikipedia (2001)
  - Simple English Wikipedia (2003)

== Esperanto ==
Encyclopedias written in Esperanto.

- Enciklopedio de Esperanto: two-volume encyclopedia about Esperanto issues (Budapest 1934); reprint in one volume, without the illustrations (1986)
- Esperanto en perspektivo: encyclopedic handbook about Esperanto issues (Rotterdam and London 1974)
- Esperanto Wikipedia (2001)

== Estonian ==
Encyclopedias written in Estonian.

- Eesti Üleüldise teaduse raamat ehk encyklopädia konversationi-lexikon: by Karl August Hermann (1900–1906)
- Estonian Encyclopedia (1932–1937) (Eesti Entsüklopeedia, 1932–1937)
- Estonian Soviet Encyclopedia (Eesti nõukogude entsüklopeedia, 1968–1976)
- ENEKE (1982–1986)
- Estonian Encyclopedia (titled Estonian Soviet Encyclopedia until 1990)
  - First phase 1985–1990: Eesti nõukogude entsüklopeedia (ENE)
  - Second phase 1990–2006: Eesti entsüklopeedia (EE)
- Estonica
- TEA entsüklopeedia (2008)
- Estonian Wikipedia (2002)

== Galician ==
Encyclopedias written in Galician.

- Enciclopedia Galega Universal: on paper and online
- Gran Enciclopedia Galega Silverio Cañada: on paper and DVD
- Galician Wikipedia (Wikipedia en galego)

== Georgian ==
Encyclopedias written in Georgian.

- Georgian Soviet Encyclopedia

== German ==
Encyclopedias written in German.

- The Austro-Hungarian Monarchy in Word and Picture (1886–1902)
- Bertelsmann Lexikothek (1967)
- Brockhaus Enzyklopädie: in print 1796–2006, online-only since 2014
- Conversations-Lexikon mit vorzüglicher Rücksicht auf die gegenwärtigen Zeiten (1796–1808; see Brockhaus)
- Der kleine Brockhaus (1925–1962, a shorter encyclopedia published by F. A. Brockhaus AG)
- Grosses vollständiges Universal-Lexicon (1751–1754)
- Herders Konversations-Lexikon (1854–1857; 2nd ed. 1875–1879)
- Meyers Konversations-Lexikon (1839–1855; 5th ed. 1893–1897)
- Oekonomische Encyklopädie (General System of State, City, Home and Agriculture) Editor Johann Georg Krünitz (242 Volumes 1773–1858)
- Pierers Universal-Lexikon (1824–1836; 7th ed. 1888–1893)
- German Wikipedia (Deutsche Wikipedia)

== Greek ==
Encyclopedias written in Greek.

- Encyclopedic lexicon: by P. Gerakakis, I–V volumes, 1861–1865 (Γερακάκης, Πέτρος. Λεξικόν εγκυκλοπαίδειας: περιέχον τα κυριωτέρα των επιστημών και τεχνών)
- Helios: Νεώτερον Εγκυκλοπαιδικόν Λεξικόν, Ήλιος (1945)
- Papyrus Larousse Britannica: Πάπυρος - Λαρούς - Μπριτάννικα (1975–2004)
- Suda: historical encyclopedia of the ancient Mediterranean world (10th century)
- Greek Wikipedia (Ελληνική Βικιπαίδεια)

== Gujarati ==
Encyclopedias written in Gujarati.

- Bhagavadgomandal: completed around by Bhagvatsingh of Gondal with the help of his education minister Chandulal Patel
- Gujarati Vishwakosh (1985–2009)

== Hebrew ==
Encyclopedias written in Hebrew.

- Encyclopaedia Hebraica
- Encyclopedia of the Holocaust
- Encyclopaedia Biblica (Israel)
- Encyclopedia Talmudit
- Hebrew Wikipedia

== Hindi ==
Encyclopedias written in Hindi.

- Agropedia
- Hindi Wikipedia
- Hindi Vishvakosh (1969–1970)
- VIGYANLY
- Hindi translation complete

== Icelandic ==
Encyclopedias written in Icelandic.

- Íslenska alfræðiorðabókin A-Ö

== Ido ==
Encyclopedias written in Ido.

- Ido Wikipedia

== Indonesian ==
Encyclopedias written in Indonesian language.

- Ensiklopedi Ekonomi Bisnis dan Manajemen
- Ensiklopedi Indonesia
- Ensiklopedi Indonesia Seri Fauna
- Ensiklopedi Indonesia Seri Geografi
- Ensiklopedia Indonesia
- Ensiklopedi Islam
- Ensiklopedi Nasional Indonesia
- Ensiklopedi politik
- Ensiklopedi umum dalam bahasa Indonesia
- Indonesian Wikipedia (Wikipedia in Indonesia)

== Japanese ==
Encyclopedias written in Japanese.

- The Heibonsha World Encyclopedia (世界大百科事典 Sekai Dai-hyakka Jiten)
- Japanese Wikipedia

== Kannada ==
Encyclopedia written in Kannada.

- Siribhoovalaya:of Kumudendu Muni

== Kazakh ==
Encyclopedias translated into Kazakh.

- Great Soviet Encyclopedia

== Korean ==
Encyclopedias written in Korean.

- Doosan Encyclopedia
- Encyclopedia of Korean Culture
- Global World Encyclopedia
- Great Korean Encyclopedia
- Jibong yuseol
- Kwangmyong Encyclopedia
- Korean Wikipedia
- Namuwiki

== Kurdish ==
Encyclopedias written in Kurdish.

- Kurdistanica (1992)

== Kyrgyz ==
Encyclopedias written in Kyrgyz.

- Kyrgyz Soviet Encyclopedia
- National encyclopedia «Kyrgyzstan»
- «Manas» encyclopedia

== Latvian ==
Encyclopedias written in Latvian.

- Latviešu konversācijas vārdnīca, 1927–1940
- Latvijas padomju enciklopēdija, 1981–1988
- Latvian Wikipedia (2003)

== Leonese ==
Encyclopedias written in Leonese.

- Llionpedia (2009)

== Lithuanian ==
Encyclopedias written in Lithuanian.

== Macedonian ==
Encyclopedias written in Macedonian.

- Encyclopedia of Yugoslavia: Macedonian edition; the first encyclopedia published in Macedonian
- Macedonian Wikipedia (Википедија)

== Malagasy ==
Encyclopedias written in Malagasy.

- Rakibolana Rakipahalalana
- Malagasy Wikipedia

== Malayalam ==
Encyclopedias written in Malayalam.

- Malayalam Britannica
- Puranic Encyclopedia Vettom Mani: published By DC Books
- Sarva Vijyana Kosham
- Viswa Sahitya Vijnanakosam
- Malayalam Wikipedia

== Marathi ==
Encyclopedias written in Marathi.

- Marathi Vishwakosh - Original Edition (22 Volumes मराठी विश्वकोश मूळ आवृत्ती)
- Marathi Vishwakosh - Original Edition: published online by Marathi Language Department, State Government of Maharashtra (मराठी विश्वकोश ज्ञानमंडळ आवृत्ती )

== Persian ==
Encyclopedias written in Persian.

- Dehkhoda Dictionary (Loghatnameh Dehkhoda)
- Encyclopaedia of Persian Language and Literature
- Encyclopedia of Iran and Islam
- The Encyclopedia of Iranian Old Music (2000)
- Encyclopedia of Islam World
- Encyclopedia Islamica
- The Persian Encyclopedia
- Encyclopedia of Sophistication (2003)
- Treasure Box of Knowledge (1993)
- Persian Wikipedia (2004)

== Sanskrit ==
Encyclopedias written in Sanskrit

- Brihat Samhita:of Varāhamihira
- Sanskrit Wikipedia
- Abhidharma Mahāvibhāṣa Śāstra

== Serbo-Croatian standard varieties ==
Encyclopedias written in Serbo-Croatian standard varieties.

- Encyclopedia of Yugoslavia (1955–1990) in 6 editions:
  - Serbo-Croatian in Latin alphabet (Enciklopedija Jugoslavije; in hindsight sometimes said to be "in Croatian")
  - Serbo-Croatian in Cyrillic alphabet (Енциклопедија Југославије; in hindsight sometimes said to be "in Serbian")
  - Slovenian
  - Macedonian
  - Albanian
  - Hungarian
- General Encyclopedia of the Yugoslav Lexicographical Institute (1955–1982; Opća enciklopedija Jugoslavenskog leksikografskog zavoda, Serbo-Croatian in Latin alphabet and according to Croatian literary standards, therefore in hindsight sometimes said to be a "Croatian encyclopedia")
- Serbo-Croatian Wikipedia (Wikipedija na srpskohrvatskom jeziku / Википедија на српскохрватском језику; since 2002)

=== Bosnian ===
- Bosnian Wikipedia (Wikipedia na bosanskom jeziku, since 2002)

=== Croatian ===
Encyclopedias written in Croatian.

- Enciklopedija hrvatske umjetnosti (1995–1996) (Encyclopedia of Croatian Art)
- Filmska enciklopedija (1986–1990) (Film Encyclopedia)
- Hrvatska enciklopedija (1999–2007) (Croatian Encyclopedia)
- Istarska enciklopedija (2005) (Istrian Encyclopedia)
- Krležijana (1993–1999) (Encyclopedia of Miroslav Krleža)
- Medicinska enciklopedija (1967–1986) (Medical Encyclopedia)
- Pomorska enciklopedija (1972–1989) (Naval Encyclopedia)
- Proleksis Encyclopedia (Proleksis enciklopedija)
- Tehnička enciklopedija (1963–1997) (Technical Encyclopedia)
- Croatian Wikipedia (Wikipedija na hrvatskom jeziku; since 2003)

=== Montenegrin ===
- Crnogorska Enciklopedija ("Montenegrin Encyclopedia"; online 2006–2008; defunct)

=== Serbian ===
Encyclopedias written in Serbian.

- Encyclopædia Britannica (2005 concise edition, Serbian translation)
- Mala Prosvetina Enciklopedija (1985) (Мала Просветина Енциклопедија - "Prosveta's Small Encyclopedia")
- Srpska Porodična Enciklopedija (Српска Породична Енциклопедија - "Serbian Family Encyclopedia")
- Vojna Enciklopedija (Војна Енциклопедија - "Military Encyclopedia")
- Serbian Wikipedia (Википедија на српском језику; since 2003)

== Sinhalese ==
Encyclopedias written in Sinhala.

- Sinhalese Encyclopaedia (සිංහල විශ්වකෝෂය)
- Sinhalese Wikipedia (සිංහල විකිපීඩියා)

== Slovak ==
Encyclopedias written in Slovak.

- Slovenský náučný slovník. 3 volumes 1932. First general encyclopedia in the Slovak language.
- Pyramída. Published between 1971 and 1990 in journal form (224 issues).
- Encyklopédia Slovenska. 6 volumes, 1977–1982. Focused on Slovakia.
- Malá slovenská encyklopédia. 1 volume 1993
- Encyclopaedia Beliana. 20 planned volumes, 1999–, 9 volumes published as of 2021
- Všeobecný encyklopedický slovník. 2002, four volumes
- Slovak Wikipedia. 2003–
- Univerzum – všeobecná obrazová encyklopédia A - Ž. 1 volume, 2011

== Slovene ==
Encyclopedias written in Slovene.

- Enciklopedija Slovenije
- Slovenski veliki leksikon (Mladinska knjiga, 2003–2005): set of 3 volumes: ISBN 86-11-14123-7, ISBN 86-11-15085-6, ISBN 86-11-16039-8
- Encyclopedia of Yugoslavia (Slovene language edition)
- Slovene Wikipedia (Slovenska Wikipedija)

== Spanish ==
Encyclopedias written in Spanish.

- Barsa
- Diccionario Enciclopédico Espasa
- Diccionario Enciclopédico Hispano-Americano de Literatura, Ciencias y Artes: Barcelona, Montaner y Simón, 1887–1899, reprints and appendices up to 1910: very readable articles, many written by known Spanish scholars of the day.; reprinted by the London editor Walter M. Jackson (C. H. Simonds Company, Impresores, Boston, Estados Unidos de Norte América)
- Enciclonet
- Enciclopedia Cousteau Mundo Submarino
- Enciclopedia Estudiantil Editorial Codex
- La Enciclopedia del Estudiante
- Enciclopedia Encarta
- Enciclopedia Jurídica Online: from Lawi; for Latin America and Spain; available online; edited by lawyers and academics
- Enciclopedia Labor
- Enciclopedia Libre Universal: also known as Enciclopedia Libre
- Enciclopedia Salvat
- Enciclopedia Temática Guinness
- Enciclopedia universal ilustrada europeo-Americana: the biggest encyclopedia of its time; also known as Enciclopedia Espasa or Enciclopedia Espasa-Calpe
- Enciclopedia Universal Micronet
- Gran Enciclopedia Aragonesa
- Gran Enciclopedia Asturiana
- Gran Enciclopedia Extremeña
- Gran Enciclopedia de Andalucía
- Gran Enciclopedia Gallega
- Gran enciclopedia planeta: 20 volumes, DVD and online encyclopedia, 2004
- El Libro de los 1001 porqués
- Lo sé todo
- Monitor: enciclopedia Salvat para todos: 13 volumes, 1965–70
- Nueva enciclopedia cumbre: published by Grolier in 14 volumes and available online
- Nueva enciclopedia Durvan
- El Nuevo Tesoro de la Juventud: published by Grolier in 20 volumes
- Spanish Wikipedia (Wikipedia en español)

== Tajik ==
Encyclopedia translated into Tajik.

- Great Soviet Encyclopedia

== Tamil ==
Encyclopedias written in Tamil.

- Kalaikkaḷañciyam (Encyclopedia) (தமிழில் கலைக்களஞ்சியம்) - 10 volumes. 15,000 articles.
- Kulandaikal Kalaikkaḷañciyam (Children's Encyclopedia) - 10 volumes
- Arivyal Kalaikkaḷañciyam (Science Encyclopedia) 19 volumes (Tanjavur Tamil University)
- Vazviyal Kalaikkaḷañciyam (Humanities Encyclopedia) 15 volumes (Tanjavur Tamil University)
- Marutuva Kalaikkaḷañciyam, (Medical Encyclopedia) - 14 volumes.
- Isai Kalaikkaḷañciyam (Music Encyclopedia) - 3 volumes
- Encyclopædia Britannica: 28,000 articles: a three-volume encyclopaedia of selected articles from the English version and special articles on Tamil culture and history (பிரிட்டானிக்கா தகவல் களஞ்சியம்)
- Encyclopaedia of Herbs (மூலிகைக் கலைக்களஞ்சியம்)
- Islamic Encyclopaedia: written by Abdul Raheem (இஸ்லாமியக் கலைக்களஞ்சியம்)
- Tamil Wikipedia: Currently has 1,38,627 articles on various fields; one of the main resources for articles in Tamil language

== Telugu ==
Encyclopedias written in Telugu.

- Andhra Vignana Sarvasvam (ఆంధ్ర విజ్ఞాన సర్వస్వము; 1912–1923)
- Andhra Vignanamu (ఆంధ్ర విజ్ఞానము; 7 volumes, 1938–1941)
- Telugu Wikipedia

== Thai ==
Encyclopedias written in Thai.

- Ratchabandittayasathan Edition of Thai Encyclopedia (สารานุกรมไทย ฉบับราชบัณฑิตยสภา; 30 volumes, 1956–2016)
- THAI JUNIOR ENCYCLOPEDIA FOUNDATION by His Majesty King Bhumibol Adulyadej The Great (สารานุกรมไทยสำหรับเยาวชน โดยพระราชประสงค์ในพระบาทสมเด็จพระบรมชนกาธิเบศร มหาภูมิพลอดุลยเดชมหาราช บรมนาถบพิตร; 44 volumes on going, 1973–present)
- Thai Encyclopedia by Uthai Sindhusarn (สารานุกรมไทย โดย อุทัย สินธุสาร; 25 volumes, 1973–1979)
- Pajana-Saranukrom Chabab Tunsamai by Pluang Na Nakhon (พจนะ-สารานุกรมฉบับทันสมัย โดย เปลื้อง ณ นคร; 2 volumes, First is Thai Dictionary, Second is Encyclopedia, 1975)
- Thailand History Encyclopedia (สารานุกรมประวัติศาสตร์ไทย; 1974) and Thailand Cultural Encyclopedia (สารานุกรมวัฒนธรรมไทย) by So Playnoi (ส.พลายน้อย)
- Britannica Concise Encyclopedia Thai Edition (Britannica Concise Encyclopedia ภาคภาษาไทย; 3 volumes, 2008)
- Thai Wikipedia

== Turkish ==
Encyclopedias written in Turkish.

- Anabritannica

== Turkmen ==
Encyclopedia translated into Turkmen.

- Great Soviet Encyclopedia

== Urdu ==
Encyclopedias written in Urdu.

- Bahar-e-Shariat
- Minhaj ul Muslimeen
- Urdu Encyclopaedia of Islam
- Urdu Wikipedia

== Uzbek ==
- Uzbek Soviet Encyclopedia (1971–80; 14 vol.)
- Uzbek National Encyclopedia (2000–06; 12 vol.)

== Vietnamese ==
Encyclopedias written in Vietnamese.

- Lịch triều hiến chương loại chí
- Từ điển Bách khoa toàn thư Việt Nam

== Welsh ==
Encyclopedias written in Welsh.

- Encyclopaedia Cambrensis (Gwyddoniadur Cymraeg)
- Gwyddoniadur Cymru yr Academi Gymreig (also in English)

== Yiddish ==
Encyclopedias written in Yiddish.

- Algemeyne Entsiklopedye
- Algemeyne Ilustrirte Entsiklopedye, David Goldblatt, 1920–1923 (not completed)
- Di Algemeyne Yidishe Entsiklopedye, Joseph Lurie and Ḥayyim Dov Horowitz, St. Petersburg, 1904 (not completed)
- Dertsiungs-Entsiklopedye (1957–59) (not completed)
- Di Ershte Algemeyne un Yudishe Hand-Entsiklopedye, Hillel Zeitlin, 1917 (not completed)
- Leksikon fun yidishn teater (first volume 1931, last volume 1969)
- Yidishe folks-entsiklopedye: far Yidishe religye, geshikhṭe, filozofye... un andere inyonim (יידישע פאלקס-ענציקלאפעדיע : פאר יידישע רעליגיע, געשיכטע, פילאזאפיע, ליטעראטור, ביאגראפיע, לענדער-קיבוצים און אנדערע ענינים) Ed. Symcha Petrushka, 1949.

== See also ==
- Lists of encyclopedias
