= List of encyclopedias in Arabic =

This is a list of encyclopedias in the Arabic language.

== History ==
The Arabic word for encyclopedia is mawsūʿah (موسوعة). It is derived from the word wāsiʿ (واسع), which means "wide".

The early Arabic compilations of knowledge in the Middle Ages included many comprehensive works, and much development of what would become known as the scientific method, historical method, and citation. The first Arab encyclopedist was Ibn Qutaybah (828–889), who wrote a number of books organizing the knowledge of his day, most importantly 'Uyun Al-Akhbar (Quintessential Reports). About 960 AD, the Brethren of Purity of Basra were engaged in their Encyclopedia of the Brethren of Purity, which may be a unique example of a classical Arabic encyclopedia written by a group rather than a solitary scholar. Other notable works include Abu Bakr al-Razi's encyclopedia of science, the Mutazilite al-Kindi's prolific output of 270 books, and Ibn Sina's The Canon of Medicine, which was a standard reference work for centuries. Also notable are works of universal history (or sociology) from the Asharites, al-Tabri, al-Masudi, al-Tabari's History of the Prophets and Kings, Ibn Rustah, Ali ibn al-Athir, and Ibn Khaldun's Muqadimmah.

Following the conquests of much of the Arab world by the Ottoman Empire, few Arabic encyclopedias were published until the 1950s. Modern Arabic encyclopedias include the online Marefa project. In 2006, the Arab League proposed the creation of a new online encyclopedia in Arabic.

== Historic encyclopedias ==
- Kitāb al-ṣifāt fi ʾl-lugha by al-Nadr ibn Shumayl (before 820, now lost)
- 'Uyun Al-Akhbar by Ibn Qutaybah (9th century)
- Al-ʿIqd al-Farīd (10th century)
- Encyclopedia of the Brethren of Purity (10th century)
- Kitab al-Aghani (10th century)
- Al-Tasrif (11th century)
- The Canon of Medicine (11th century)
- The Ultimate Ambition in the Arts of Erudition (14th century)

== Contemporary encyclopedias ==
=== Print ===
- Arab Encyclopedia (2008–...)
- Arabic Legislations Encyclopedia
- Khalf Aswar el Elm (Behind Scientific Barriers)
- Marefa
- Al-Arabi
- Mawsooat Al mawsooa Al tarikheya lel-alam al Arabi (الموسوعة التاريخية للعالم العربي)
- Anabaa
- Marefah

=== Digital ===
==== General ====
- Dahsha (2003–...)
- Intaaj
- Global Arabic Encyclopedia (1992–...)(الموسوعة العربية العالمية)
- Arab Encyclopedia (الموسوعة العربية)
- Arabic Wikipedia (ويكيبيديا العربية)
- Mawdoo3 (موسوعة موضوع)
- Marefa (معرفة)

==== Scientific ====
- Arabic Chemistry Encyclopedia
- Al-Mawsooa

==== Literature ====
- Alankaa: Encyclopedia of Dictionaries
- Al-Waraq
- Ajeeb Sakhr

==== Historical ====
- Arabiah

==== Religion ====
- Tabaqat al-Shafi'iyya al-Kubra
- Nabulsi
- Muslimedia Free Wiki-based Islamic Encyclopedia in Arabic
- copticpedia Coptic Orthodox Encyclopedia الموسوعة القبطية الأرثوذكسية

==== Social ====
- Istisharaat

==== Law ====
- JurisPedia

==== Medical ====
- King Abdullah Abdul Aziz Health Encyclopedia

== See also ==
- List of Arabic dictionaries
