= Malayalam Encyclopedia =

Malayalam Encyclopedia may refer to:

- Britannica Malayalam Encyclopedia, Malayalam translation of the Britannica Concise Encyclopedia
- Sarvavijnanakosam, Malayalam language encyclopedia; known in English as Malayalam Encyclopedia
