= Vellayani Arjunan =

Indian writer, scholar and linguist (1933–2023)

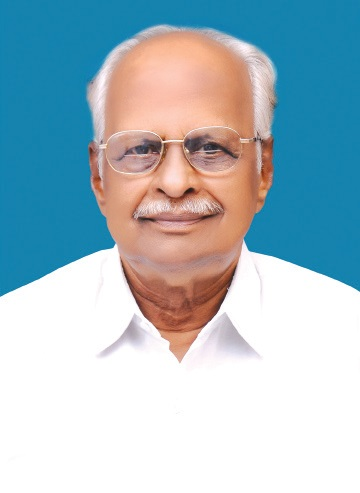
- Born: 10 February 1933; Vellayani, Travancore, British Raj (present day Thiruvananthapuram, Kerala, India)
- Died: 31 May 2023 (aged 90); Thiruvananthapuram, Kerala, India
- Occupations: Writer; linguist; academic; scholar
- Years active: 1960–2023
- Spouse: Radhamani A.
- Children: Jayasree A R (deceased), Supriya A R, Sahithi A R, Rajasree A R, Jayasankar Prasad
- Parents: G. Shankara Panicker; Narayani
- Awards: Padma Shri; Paramacharya Award

Vellayani Arjunan (10 February 1933 – 31 May 2023) was an Indian writer, scholar, academician, and linguist from Kerala. He served two terms at the State Institute of Encyclopedic Publications as chief editor from 1975 to 1988 and as director from 2001 to 2004. During his tenure at the institute, seven volumes of the 12-volume Malayalam encyclopedia Viswasahityavijnanakosam were published. He is credited with several publications, including children's literature and critical studies. His book Gaveshana Mekhala has been a prescribed text for the post graduate course M.A. Malayalam at the Aligarh Muslim University. A recipient of the Paramacharya Award from Sarojini Bhaskaran Memorial Charitable Public Trust, he was honored by the Government of India in 2008 with the fourth highest Indian civilian award of Padma Shri.

In 2015, Aligarh Muslim University awarded him a third D.Litt. degree for his thesis in Malayalam on Influence of Sree Narayana Guru on Malayalam Poetry. He was the first Indian to hold three D.Litt. degrees.

== Early life and education ==
Vellayani Arjunan was born on 10 February 1933 to G. Shankara Panicker, an agriculturalist and Narayani, a housewife, at Vellayani in the erstwhile Kingdom of Travancore. After receiving a Master of Arts degree in Malayalam, he went on to teach Malayalam Language and Literature at Sree Narayana College in Kollam. He later became the first Malayalam lecturer in Aligarh Muslim University, from which he gained his PhD degree in 1964. After leaving Aligarh Muslim University, he was appointed director of the State Institute of Encyclopaedic Publications in Kerala.

| Degree | Topic | Awarding Institution |
|---|---|---|
| D.Litt. | Influence of Sree Narayana Guru on Malayalam Poetry. | Aligarh Muslim University |
| D.Litt. | A Comparative Study of the Mutual Relations and Uniformity of Hindi and Malayalam Languages. | Agra University |
| D.Litt. | The influence of Hindi Vocabularies on the South Indian Languages: A Linguistic study. | Jabalpur University |
| Ph.D. | A Comparative Linguistic Study of Common Vocables of Hindi and Malayalam Languages. | Aligarh Muslim University |

=== Other Degrees ===
| Degree | Subject |
|---|---|
| B.A. Hons | Malayalam Language and Literature |
| M.A. | Malayalam Language and Literature |
| M.A. | Hindi Language and Literature |
| M.A. | Hindi Special |
| P.G. Diploma | Tamil, Telugu, Kannada |

== Death ==
Arjunan died in Thiruvananthapuram, Kerala on 31 May 2023, at the age of 90.

== See also ==
- State Institute of Encyclopaedic Publications
- Viswasahityavijnanakosam
