= Micronet =

Micronet may refer to:

- MicroNet, the original name of the CompuServe Information Service when it was released in 1979
- Micronet, a Meso-gamma to microscale network of surface weather observation stations spaced closer than a mesonet; typically covering metropolitan areas
- Micronet 800, an information provider (IP) on Prestel
- Enciclopedia Universal Micronet, a Spanish encyclopedia
