= Galician Wikipedia =

Galician-language edition of Wikipedia

Galician Wikipedia or Galipedia
- Galician Wikipedia logo

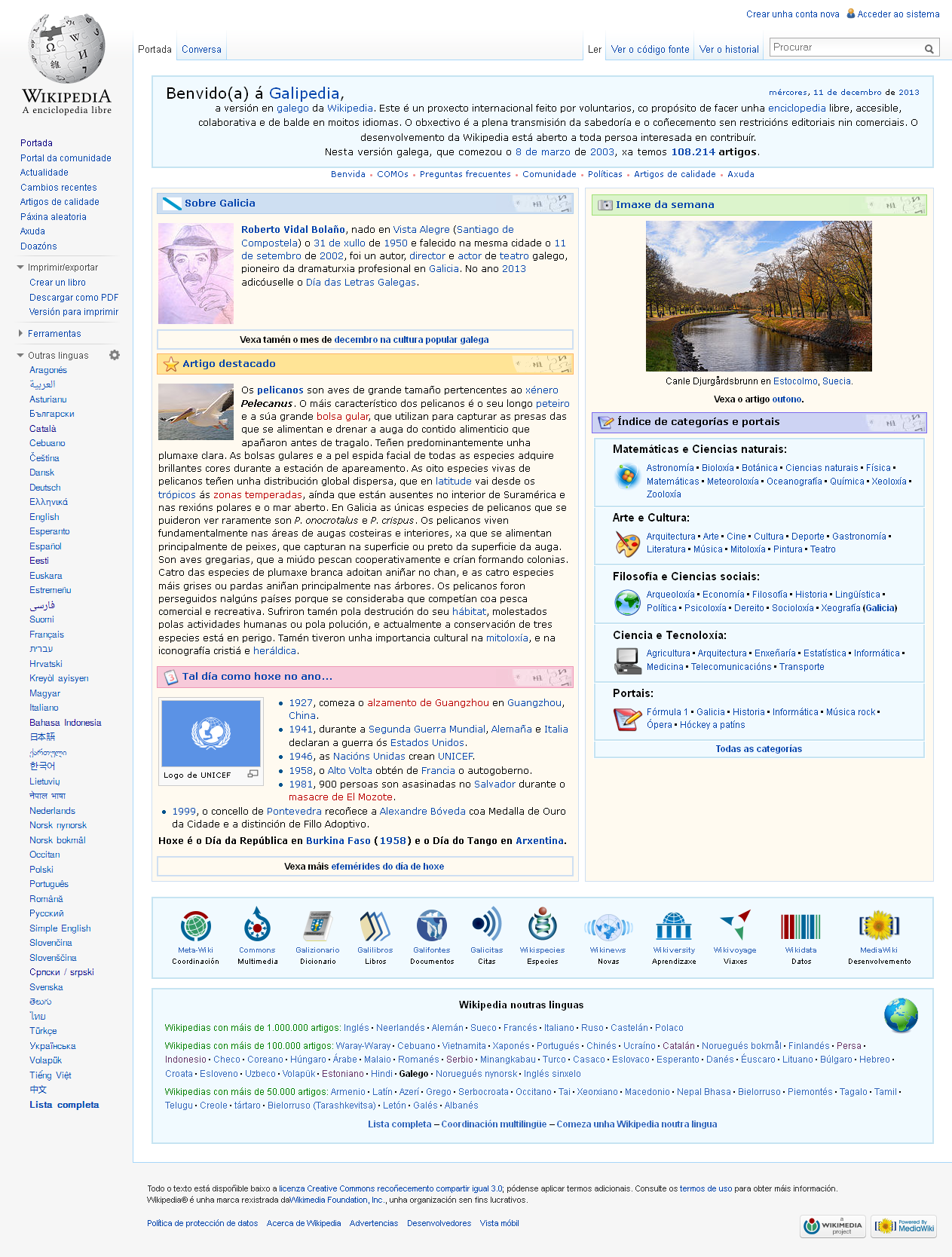
- Screenshot Main Page of the Galician Wikipedia in December 2013
- Website type: Online encyclopedia
- Available in: Galician
- Owner: Wikimedia Foundation
- Editor: Galician-language Wikipedia community
- Website: gl.wikipedia.org
- Commercial: No
- Registration: Optional
- Users: 174,869 users and 6 administrators (as of 19 September 2026)
- Launched: 8 March 2003; 23 years ago
- Content license: Creative Commons Attribution/ Share-Alike 4.0 (most text also dual-licensed under GFDL); Media licensing varies

The Galician Wikipedia (Galician: Wikipedia en lingua galega), also popularly known as Galipedia (Galician: Galipedia), is the Galician-language edition of Wikipedia, a free and publicly editable online encyclopedia.

Launched on 8 March 2003, it has 234,663 articles, making it the fifty-second-largest edition of Wikipedia by number of articles as of 19 September 2026, after having reached 100,000 articles on 4 March 2013, four days before its tenth anniversary. It has the 47th-most edits and also ranks 53rd in terms of article depth among Wikipedias. At the start of 2013, 101,305 different images were used.

For a chronological list of Galipedia events, see gl:Wikipedia:Actualidade. There are also statistics pages, including gl:Especial:Estatísticas and gl:Wikipedia:Estatísticas.

== Trajectory ==
Collaboration manual (PDF).

=== History ===
The first user, ILVI, registered on March 8, 2003, and quickly began working on what would be the first version of the Main Page. Four days later he created the first article in the database: grupo (group). He would continue with other entries such as ou (or), cal (calcium oxide), ciencias naturais (natural science), ciencias humanas (human science), ciencias ocultas (occult), ciencias aplicadas (applied science) and botánica (botany).

Months later, Agremon registered and became the first administrator of the Galician Wikipedia. He was the one who first used the term Galipedia to refer to the project, which had still only existed for less than a year. Little by little, Galipedia was mentioned in some newspapers, websites, and other sources, which were interested in the work done on it.

=== Characteristics ===
As the Galician version of Wikipedia, it is a collaborative encyclopedia written in the Galician language. It is open to any type of contribution, and accepts various currents of thought, as long as they are not aggressive. It accepts all possible topics, from sport and the cuisine of each country, to the biographies of people in physics, astronomy, and linguistics, to history, for example that of the Kingdom of Galicia.

It differs from encyclopedias in use mainly in two aspects. On the one hand, it enjoys exorbitant growth, while, on the other, it highlights its ability to absorb information and adapt it practically immediately. Thus, for example, obituaries or news considered transcendent and encyclopedic in nature are on many occasions included in Galipedia in a matter of hours, or even minutes. This is also possible through contact with other languages' versions of Wikipedia, of which there are more than 300, from which translations or templates are obtained.

The license it uses is the so-called GNU Free Documentation License.

In September 2011, 31% of Galipedia articles were categorised or subcategorised within the category Galicia.

Like the English Wikipedia, Galipedia has a "no disclaimers" policy. However, an exception is made for medical warnings.

=== Images ===
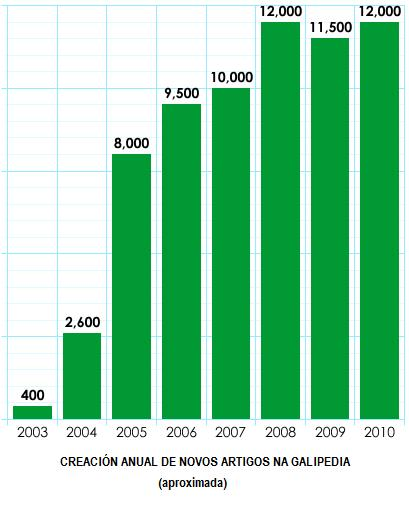
Annual number of new articles.

As for the images, Galipedia has its own fund, thanks to Wikimedia Commons, the common fund. This is not the case in all versions of Wikipedia. There are currently 35 files, most of them images, uploaded internally. As of early February 2013, it had 101,305 distinct images across all project articles (244,226 counting duplicate images). The most used images, not counting icons or flags, were Concellos menos poboados de Galiza.PNG, which was used 1,284 times (included in the template gl:Modelo:Concellos de Galicia en progreso), and Piazza del Campidoglio.jpg, which was used 1,082 times (included in the template gl:Modelo:Xeografía en progreso).

=== Editing ===
The number of active editors has varied since 2009 between approximately 260 and 330. Of these, around twenty are very active and among them are a maximum of 3 who, in general, exceed 1,000 monthly editions. The average creation of articles since the project was opened in April 2002 is 8,250 per year. However, if only the last period is taken into account (from 2007 to 2010, both inclusive), the average increases to 11,400 new articles. Around 35% of these articles were created by the 10 most active editors.

The categorisation of both articles and images is around 100%.

== Featured articles ==
Galipedia has 253 featured articles. The first to acquire this distinction was the article gl:Club Baloncesto Breogán (CB Breogán) on 20 June 2010. Later on, the list would be expanded by the articles of gl:Alfonso Daniel Rodríguez Castelao (Alfonso Daniel Rodríguez Castelao), gl:Ramón Piñeiro (Ramón Piñeiro López), gl:Lugo (Lugo), gl:Hórreo galego (Hórreo), gl:Reino de Galicia (Kingdom of Galicia), gl:Estatuto de autonomía de Galicia de 1936 (Statute of Autonomy of Galicia of 1936), gl:Valentín Paz-Andrade (Valentín Paz Andrade), gl:Alzamento de Pascua (Easter Rising), gl:Caso do metílico (Spanish methanol poisonings), gl:Praga (Prague), gl:The Beatles (The Beatles), gl:Lenin (Vladimir Lenin), gl:Alemaña (Germany), gl:Real Club Celta de Vigo (RC Celta de Vigo), gl:Prestige (MV Prestige), gl:Catedral de Santiago de Compostela (Santiago de Compostela Cathedral) and gl:Tristan und Isolde (Tristan und Isolde), to which many others would be added over time. In 2018, coinciding with the project's 15th anniversary, more than 150 featured articles were published.

In 2016, good articles started to be chosen as well. There are currently 117 articles that are considered 'good'. The first article to be considered 'good' was gl:Slipknot (Slipknot (band)).

== Human factor ==
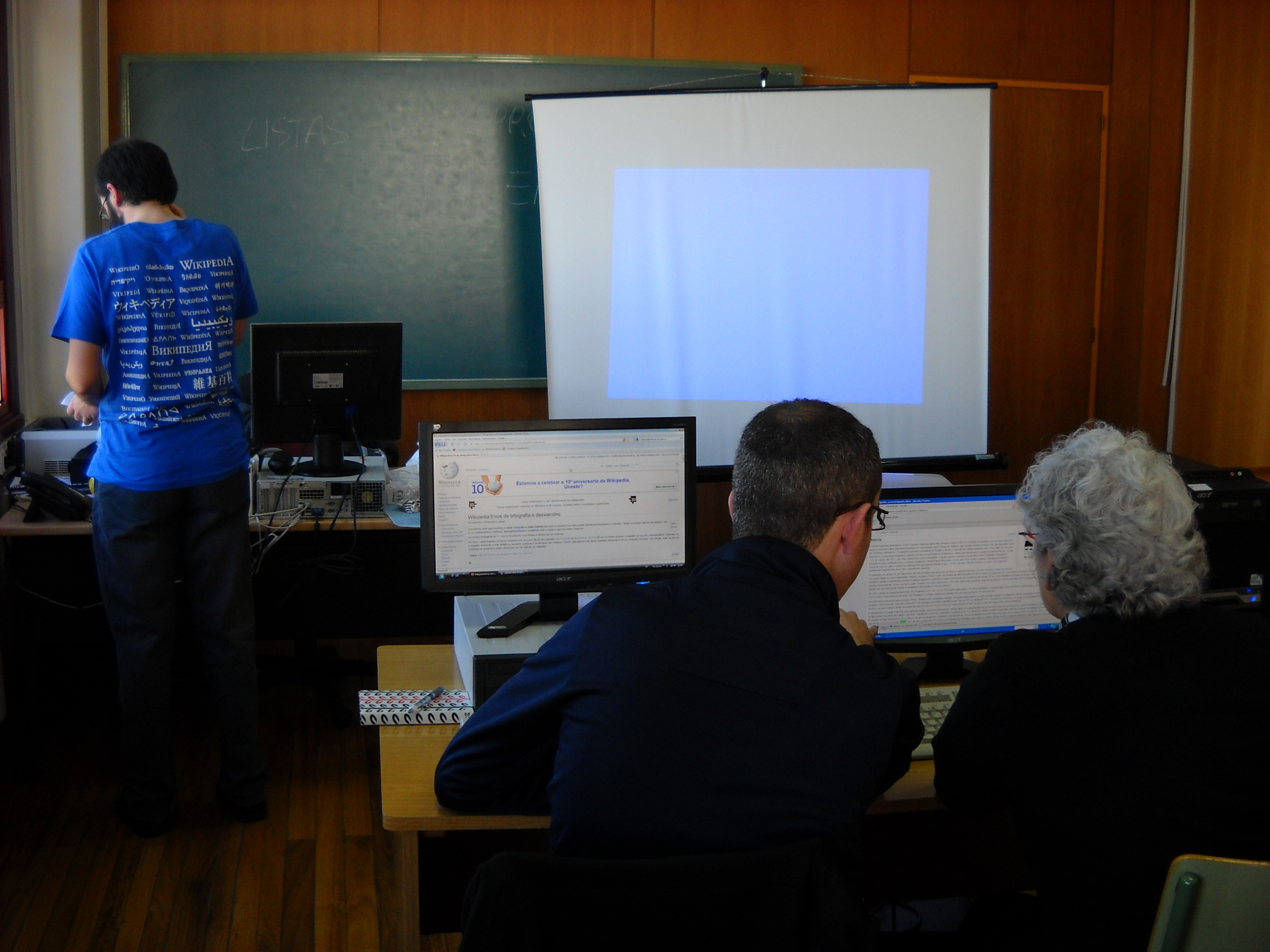
Meeting in Culleredo to publicise Galipedia.

The Galipedia meant the creation of a community of collaborative people with common ties, and also of different origins, ages or ideologies. Thus, meetings are held in which the history of Galipedia, the present reality and future goals are discussed. There is also a friendship group formed around the encyclopedia, which has given rise to groups on social networks such as Facebook or Twitter. The presence of women is reduced in Galipedia, a problem common to other versions.

The activity through the network is complemented with Galipedia dissemination projects, such as lectures in educational centers or meetings to spread its use. On 15 January 2011, on Wikipedia's 10th anniversary, there was a meeting in Culleredo and another in Ribadeo. In September that year, the City of Culture of Santiago de Compostela hosted a workshop.

In 2011, on 15 January, the anniversary of Wikipedia, and on 8 March, the anniversary of Galipedia, editing challenges were carried out to achieve new records. In January it was set to make 5,000 edits in one day, of which just over 4,500 were made, and in March it was set to make 500 new articles in one day (about 450 were created).

On March 9, 2013, Galipedia's 10th anniversary was celebrated with a meeting in Santiago de Compostela that included several presentations on free knowledge and cultural activism.

Throughout its history, Galipedia's activity has been reflected in various media, with interviews with users on TVG or Radio Galega, and articles in Xornal de Galicia, Vieiros or Praza.gal.

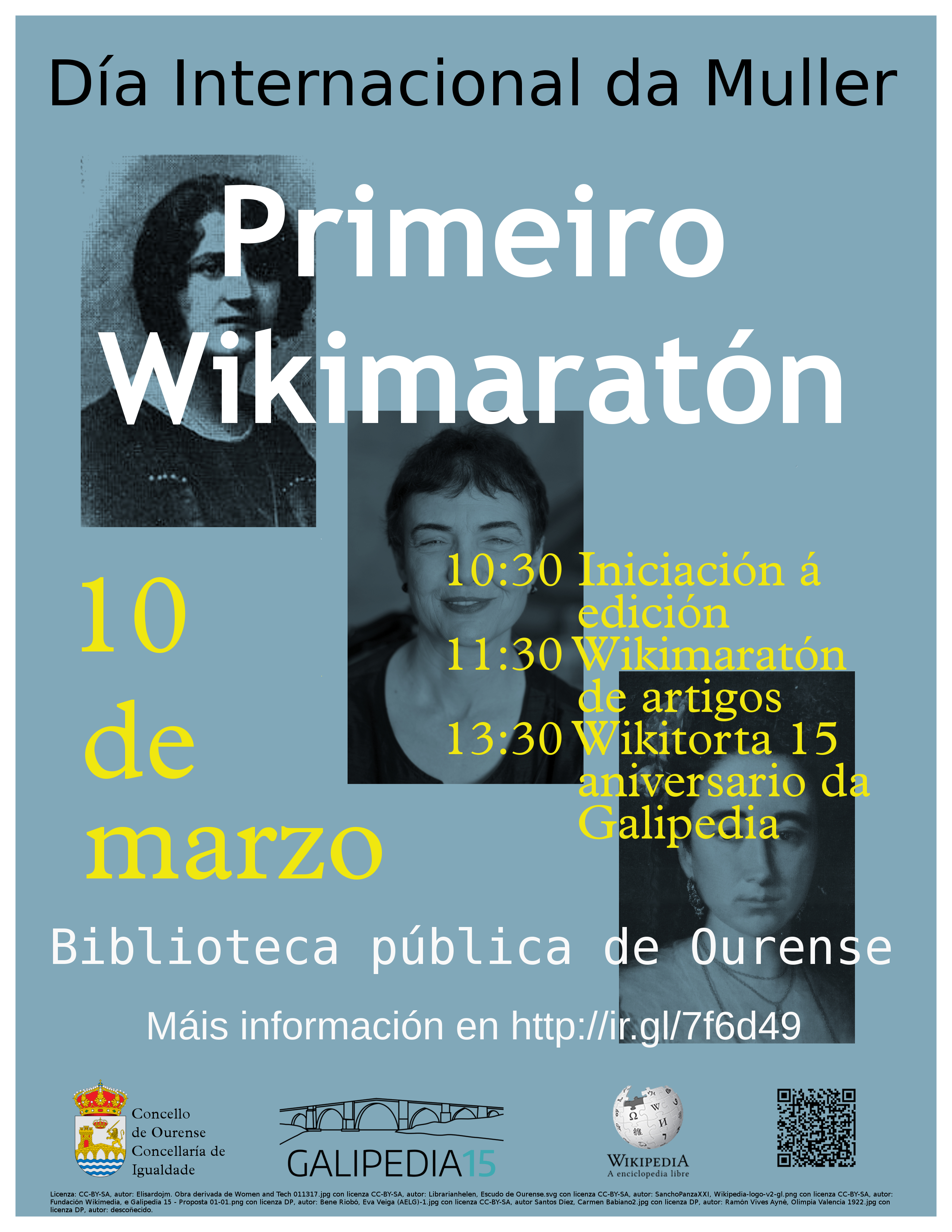
Poster of the first International Women's Day Wikimarathon in Ourense.

In March 2018, the project's fifteenth anniversary was celebrated with the first Wikimarathon for International Women's Day and a meeting in Ourense.

On 4 July 2018, it blacked out its pages. This followed the action started by the Italian Wikipedia before the European Parliament voted on a Directive on copyright in the European Union.

== E-dixgal ==
E-dixgal is a virtual learning space of the Xunta de Galicia for 5th and 6th grade students and 1st and 2nd grade ESO students, which includes a direct link to the Galipedia homepage.

== Commemorative logos of time evolution ==
Wikipedia	GL		EN
celebration	no. of articles	anniversary	anniversary
6 December 2006	20,000		
23 June 2007	25,000		
3 December 2007	30,000		
8 March 2008		5	
15 January 2011			10
8 March 2011		8	
6 September 2012	90,000		
4 March 2013	100,000		
8 March 2015		12	
8 March 2018		15	
2023	200,000		

== Recognitions ==
- The platinum "G" in 2006, the highest distinction in the RdL awards of the Faculty of Social Sciences and Communication of Pontevedra, of the University of Vigo
- Xoán Manuel Pintos Award (2018) for commitment to the language, awarded by Pontevedra City Council.
- Rosalía de Castro Language Award in 2018 for the promotion of the language, awarded by the Provincial Council of A Coruña.
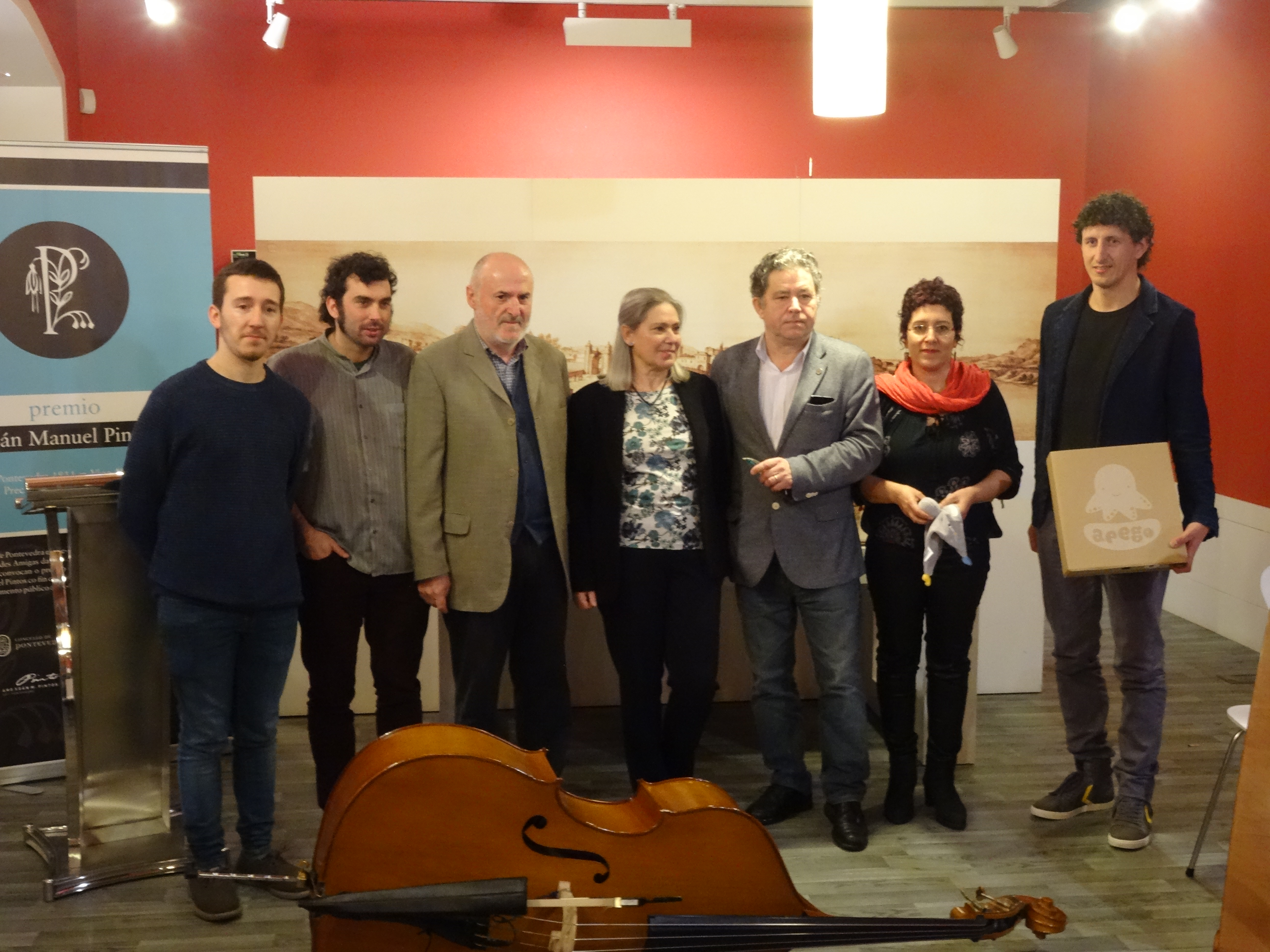
Delivery of the Xoán Manuel Pintos Award in 2018.

Galipedia received the Xoán Manuel Pintos award in 2018.

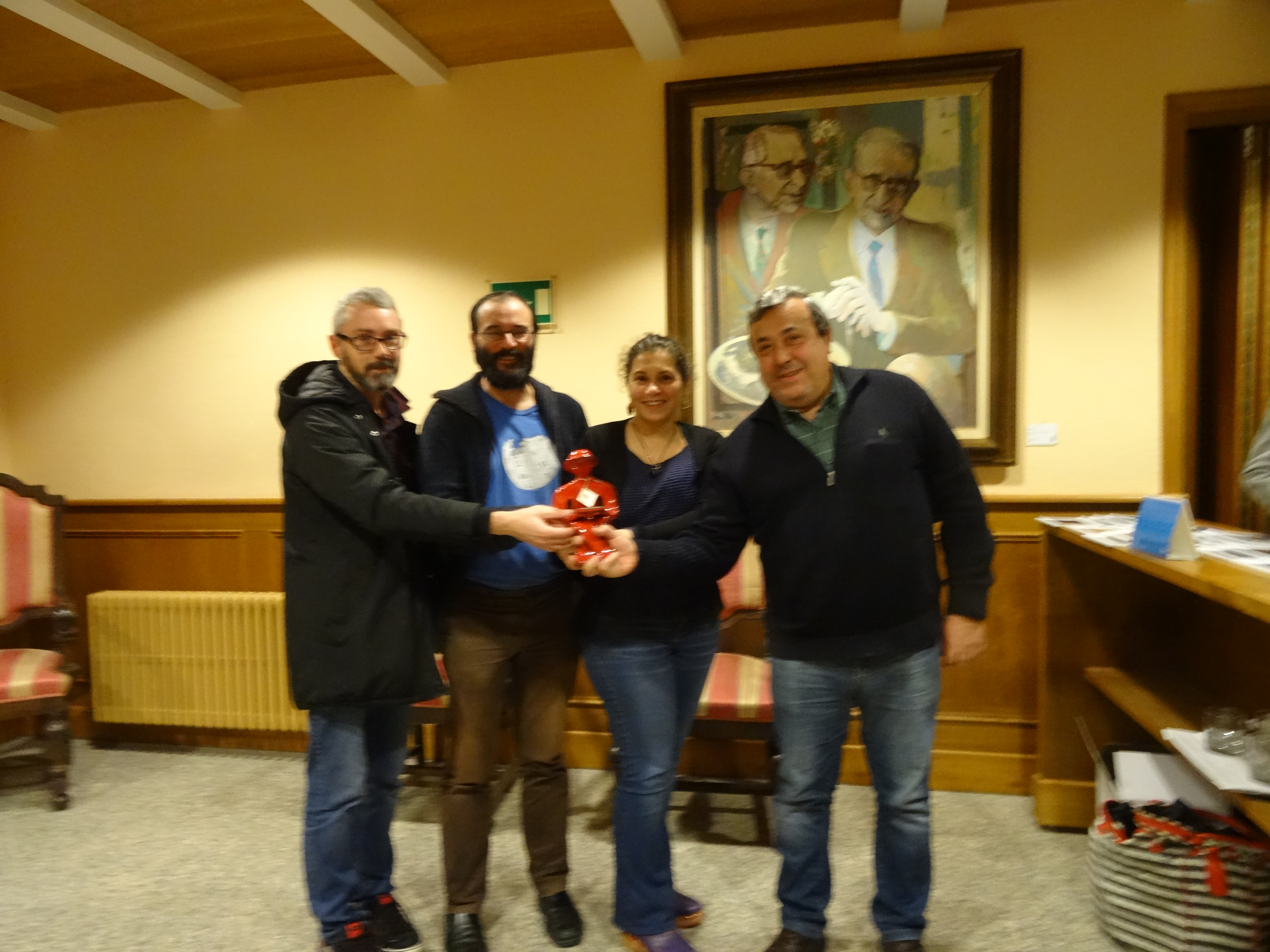
Collection of the Rosalía de Castro Language Award from the Provincial Council of A Coruña.

== See also ==
- Gran Enciclopedia Galega Silverio Cañada
- Enciclopedia Galega Universal
- Enciclopedia Temática Ilustrada A Nosa Terra
- Enciclopedia temática de Galicia
