= Muse Mary George =

Indian writer and academic

- Born: 12 March 1965 (age 60); Kanjirappally, Kottayam district
- Education: PhD
- Occupation(s): Critic, poet, teacher
- Spouse: Mathew Jacob

Prof Dr Muse Mary George (born 12 March 1965) is a Malayalam writer, literary critic, and educationist. She published more than 50 articles and poems in magazines. She worked as a columnist. Muse worked as a professor in the Department of Malayalam at Union Christian College, Aluva. Muse Mary's collections of poems include "Ispadu Rani" and "Rahasyandriyangal". She works as director of State Institute of Encyclopaedic Publications

== Books ==
- Streepaksha Madhyama Padanangal (Ed) – Current books, Kottayam
- Ispedu Rani (Collection of Poems) -Grey Friars Publications
- Malayalam Intercom – DC Books, Kottayam
- Rahasya Indriyangal (Collection of Poems)- Fabian books
- Streeye Enikkum Ninakkum Enthu? -Christava Sahithya Samithy
- Utaladhikaram – Olive Publications
- Mercury Jeevithathinte Resamapini -Sahithya Pravarthak co-operative Society
- Disgrace (Translation) – DC Books
- Pazhaya Kruthi Puthiya Vayana – Study Ancient Malayalam Books, Published by dept of Malayalam
- Gender / Linga Padhavi – Published by Dept of Malayalam
- Uppu Tharisse – (Collection of Poems) Published by DC Books, Kottayam
- Mary's Musings – (Essays) Published by Saikatham Books, Kothamangalam

== Recognition ==
- 1993-Assissi Literary Award
- 2012– Mahilathilakam Award by Social Welfare Dept Govt of Kerala
- 2015– M.P.Paul Research Award for supervising the best dissertation
- 2018– Sahodharan Ayyappan Award
