= Altibbi =

Arabic health website

AlTibbi
- Official logo
- Website type: Internet Medical Content Publisher
- Available in: Arabic
- Headquarters: Amman, Jordan
- Owner: Jalil Labadi
- Website: altibbi.com
- Commercial: Yes
- Launched: 2008
- Current status: Active

AlTibbi (Arabic: الطبي) is a digital health platform in the Middle East and North Africa (MENA). Launched by both Jalil Labadi and his father, Dr. Abdel Aziz Labadi, in 2008 in Amman, Jordan. The platform aims to present reliable, up-to-date and simplified medical information to users in the region in Arabic, according to their proclaimed mission. Today, the website features medical articles, a medical glossary, a section that is dedicated to questions and answers, the latest news in medicine, telehealth services and consultations. AlTibbi has also partnered with Mawdoo3, a leading online Arabic content provider, to provide content to the audience in the region.

== History ==
=== Founded ===
AlTibbi was launched in 2011 by Jalil Allabadi from Amman, the capital of Jordan. Its goal was to meet the needs of Arabic users in accessing accurate medical information from trusted sources. Jalil Allabadi developed the idea of an Arabic medical dictionary, which was originally created by his father, Dr. Abdulaziz Allabadi, in 2004 after returning from Germany and recognizing the Arab public's need for such information in their native language.

=== Collaborations and Partnerships ===
Al-Tibbi collaborated with the Egyptian Ministry of Health and the Egyptian Ministry of Communications and Information Technology to provide 24/7 electronic medical consultations in Egypt. Al-Tibbi also conducted a global campaign in collaboration with the United Nations Development Program in Egypt and the Egyptian Telecommunications Company. This campaign aimed to provide healthcare consultations to patients, particularly those living in remote areas with limited access to proper healthcare. Al-Tibbi also partnered with the Royal Health Awareness Society to offer a specialized package for individuals with chronic diseases, aiming to provide appropriate care and advice to improve treatment outcomes.

Al-Tibbi collaborated with various companies to provide medical consultations. An agreement was made between Al-Tibbi and Reckitt, a multinational company that owns brands such as Durex, Gaviscon, and Strepsils, to raise awareness about health-related issues. For example, through this partnership, Durex was able to respond to all sexual health-related medical consultations from Saudi Arabia and Egypt on the Al-Tebi platform.

In Libya, Al-Tibbi collaborated with Libyana Mobile Phone Company to provide health advice and medical information to its users, offering thousands of medical consultations daily.

=== Funding and Investments ===
- 2011: Al-Tibbi was initially self-funded by the founder and through financing from friends and relatives.
- 2015: Al-Tibbi received its first investments from Middle East Venture Partners (MEVP) and Dash Ventures, which were dedicated to increasing interaction between doctors and patients and expanding the user base in five Arab countries: Saudi Arabia, the United Arab Emirates, Kuwait, Jordan, and Lebanon.
- 2017: Al-Tibbi secured a new funding round of $6.5 million from Middle East Venture Partners, Dash Ventures, TAMM, RIMCO Investments, Endeavor's Catalyst Fund, and other investors. This investment will be utilized to develop comprehensive healthcare solutions, penetrate new markets, and enrich the medical content on the platform.

== Background ==
Upon his return from Germany in 2004, Dr. Abdel Aziz Labadi launched the "Medical Glossary" in Arabic, creating a medical reference for Arabic-speakers. In 2008, Jalil Labadi sought to build on his father's glossary, and create a more comprehensive platform, targeting all Arabic-speakers in the MENA region who were, according to his observations, in need of reliable information in their mother-tongue.

- In 2010, the medical glossary was further developed and turned into a multi-service medical website, with the aim of reaching as many users as possible.
- In 2012, the website received text questions from patients and provided answers from specialized doctors for free.
- In 2016, remote consultation services were activated, and users could, for the first time, contact doctors at any place and time via the internet or telephone.
- In 2019, the platform enabled doctors to activate the e-clinic, a patient management system where they could manage patients' files, appointments, bookings, and electronic health records online and launched services globally.

== Funding ==
When it was first launched in 2008, the founders relied on self-funding, and the financial support of friends and relatives. The website received its first investment in 2015 from Middle East Venture Partners and DASH ventures.

With this investment, Altibbi was able to enhance interaction between doctors and users, and draw a larger number of doctors and users from five Arab countries: Saudi Arabia, UAE, Kuwait, Jordan, and Lebanon.

In 2018, Altibbi received a new round of funding, with a total of US$6.5 million from Middle East Venture Partners, DASH Ventures, TAMM, RIMCO Investments, Endeavor's Catalyst Fund, and other investors. This investment is expected to help the platform further develop its integrated health solutions, access new markets and enrich medical content in Arabic.

In March 2023, Altibbi raised $44 million in funding, to drive its growth in Saudi Arabia and Egypt.

== Services ==
In early 2021, the "Al-Tibbi" application was launched to provide easy and convenient medical consultations. The application also introduced the "+Connect" feature to facilitate communication between doctors and patients seeking medical advice. Tebi Clinic also includes an artificial intelligence feature that enables the app to transcribe audio recommendations, allowing doctors to provide medical notes automatically instead of typing them within the application.

Additionally, the AI-powered Tebi Clinic app includes a feature for reading vital signs from the mobile phone camera during medical consultations. The app can read heart rate, respiratory rate, blood pressure, oxygen saturation, and stress levels through light reflections on the patient's skin.

Furthermore, the Tebi website launched the "Tebi Mama" application, the first of its kind in the Arab world, which focuses on providing health information and advice to pregnant women, mothers, and fathers regarding prenatal and postnatal care.

In collaboration with Primary Care International, Tebi also launched the "Tebi Academy" as a training platform for doctors to enhance their medical knowledge.

On the other hand, several research papers authored by the Tebi team were published, addressing the benefits of artificial intelligence in assisting doctors in making appropriate medical decisions based on the patient's condition. The research team at Tebi conducted a study on the possibility of automatically evaluating the medical advice provided on the website using the available information.

== Statistics ==
Altibbi brings together more than 12 thousand accredited medical doctors from all specializations and different Arab countries. Users can get a remote medical diagnosis (if possible) from providers who facilitate the provision of healthcare services for users around the clock.

In 2017, more than 50 thousand users were registered for phone consultation service with medical doctors. In addition, more than 10 million people visited the website on a monthly basis.

== Awards ==
In recognition of its efforts as one of the leading creators of medical content in Arabic, Altibbi was awarded the first prize in health category by the Arab E-Content Award in Bahrain in 2013.

The award, which falls under the United Nations' World Global Summit (WGS), reportedly came after presenting high-quality digital content in Arabic for years.

== Similar sites ==
webteb

Tabibe

Mayo Clinic
