= Enciclonet =

Spanish internet encyclopedia

Enciclonet is an online general purpose encyclopedia in the Spanish language. It is based on the Enciclopedia Universal Micronet, and it has 185,000 articles and more than 20,500 multimedia items.

A 2012 study comparing Enciclonet content to that of Spanish Wikipedia found the former to be highly popular and comprehensive in comparison to other online encyclopedias available in Spanish.

According to their website, there are two types of subscriptions on this site:

1. Free subscribers can browse all the articles and vote freely to determine the quality of articles.
2. Premium subscribers can write their own encyclopedic articles, but the editorial team reviews the submitted articles.
