= Global Arabic Encyclopedia =

Reference work first published in 1996

- Language: Arabic language
- Series: 30 volumes
- Genre: Encyclopedia
- Publication date: 1996 - First Edition; 1999 - Second Edition
- Publication place: Saudi Arabia

The Global Arabic Encyclopedia (Arabic: الموسوعة العربية العالمية) is an encyclopedic reference work written in the Arabic language. It is in part a translation of the American World Book Encyclopedia, edited and expanded to reflect an Arab–Muslim perspective. Its composition and publication were funded by Sultan bin Abdulaziz, Crown Prince of Saudi Arabia.

The printed edition first appeared in 1996 (1416 AH) as a 30-volume set with color illustrations. A second, revised edition appeared in 1999 (1419 AH) and in the same year a digitization project was started that resulted in an electronic internet edition in 2004. The encyclopedia contains almost 24,000 articles.

== Editions ==
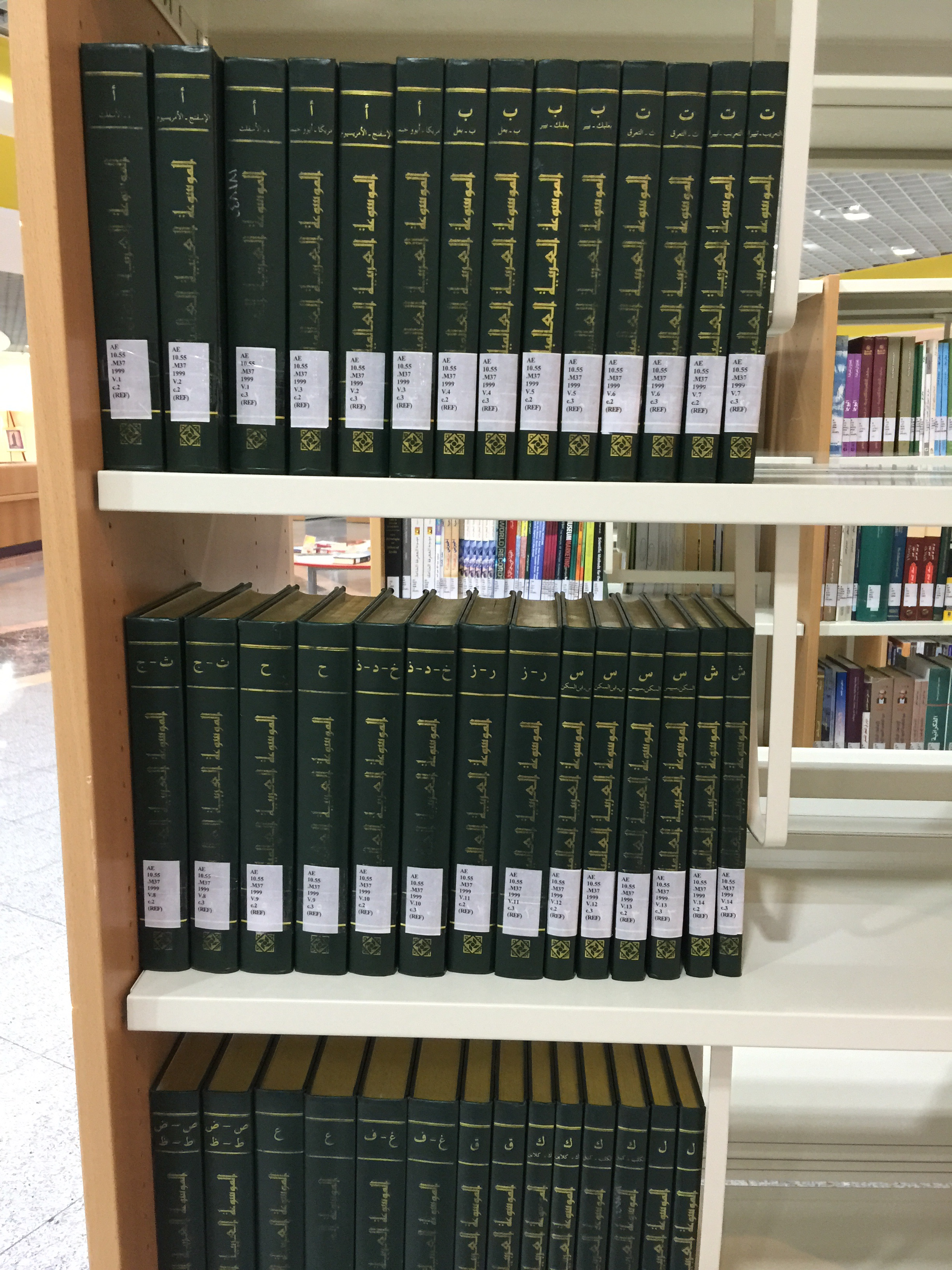
Sample of global encyclopedia volumes

The printed edition of the Global Arabic Encyclopedia consists of 30 volumes, it contains about 17,000 pages and has approximately 12,000 illustrations, 2500 maps, 4,000 charts, and 1,000 tables and timelines. it was printed twice, first in 1996 and the final one was in 1999.

The electronic online version of the global Arabic encyclopedia consists of two sections, the free of charge section which contains about 4,000 articles searchable freely. The other section of the site is a subscription based portion that covers over 150,000 research material-titles and subtitles, includes 20,000 illustrations and maps. 500 audio files and video clips are also available. In Ramadan 2007 (1428 AH) an unofficial version of the encyclopedia was released in the .chm format.

== Reception ==
In a 2009 catalogue entry, P. Bearman describes the GAE as having wide coverage, but also a "subtle Saudi-centric stance" and an overall lack of objectivity, as witnessed by the lack of any mention of the Holocaust, the not-mentioning of the homoeroticism in articles about W. H. Auden and Abu Nuwas, and the removal of the World Book article about homosexuality in favor of a condemning new article about sexual deviations. The GAE contains no lists of references or suggestions for further reading.

== See also ==
- Arabic encyclopedia
- List of encyclopedias by language
- List of historical encyclopedias
