= Papyrus Larousse Britannica =

Greek language encyclopedia

The Papyrus Larousse Britannica (Πάπυρος Larousse Britannica) is a Greek language encyclopedia of 61 volumes, based on the French encyclopedia Grand Larousse encyclopédique and the English Encyclopædia Britannica.

== See also ==
- List of Greek encyclopedias
