= Sino-Uralic hypothesis =

Fringe proposed language family

Sino-Uralic
- (Proposed, no significant support)
- Geographic distribution: Northern Eurasia, East Asia
- Linguistic classification: Proposed language family
- Subdivisions: Uralic; Sinitic

Language codes
- Glottolog: None
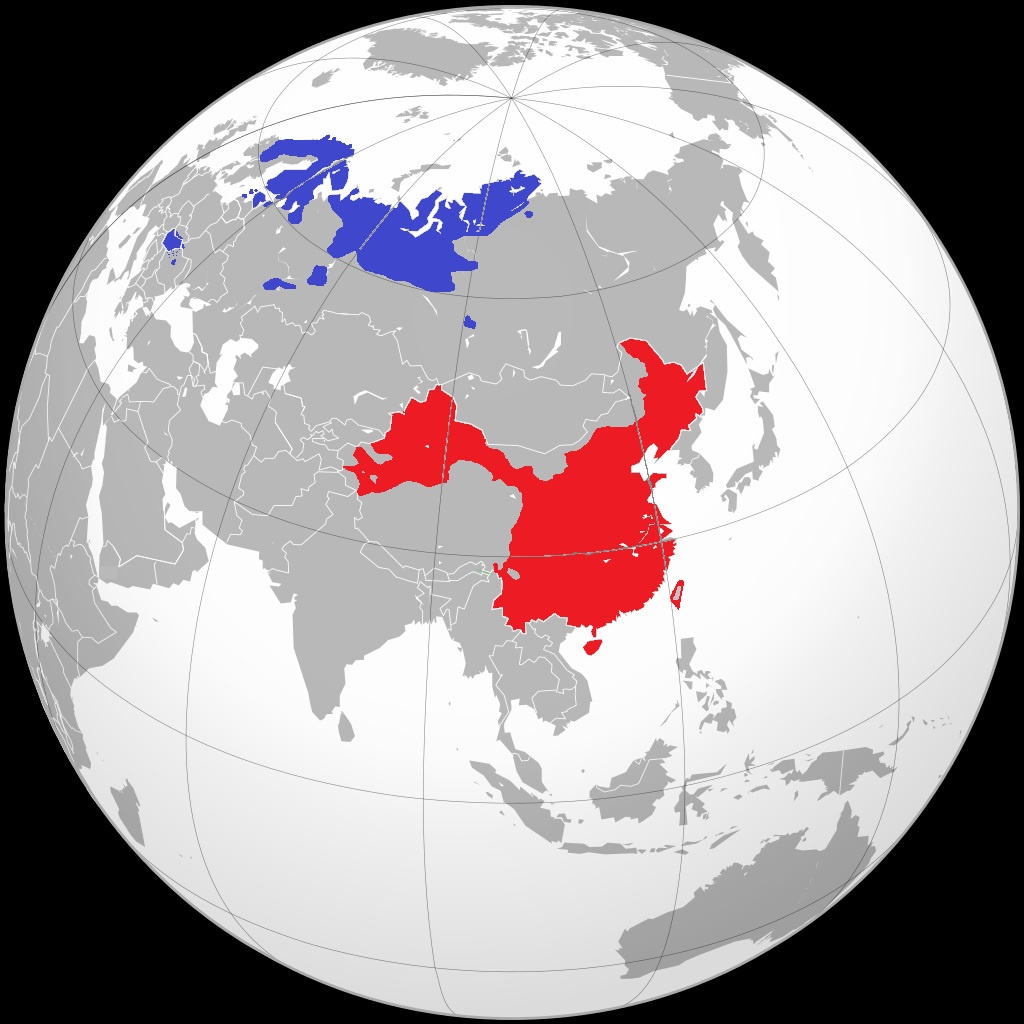
- Sino-Uralic languages

Sino-Uralic or Sino-Finnic is a long-range linguistic proposal that links the Sinitic languages (Chinese) and the Uralic languages. Sino-Uralic is proposed as an alternative to the Sino-Tibetan family and is at odds with mainstream comparative linguistics, which firmly includes the Sinitic languages in the Sino-Tibetan family. The proposal has been brought forward by the Chinese linguist Jingyi Gao, based on works by 19th century linguists such as Karl August Hermann. However, connections with the Uralic and other language families are generally seen as speculative.

== Theory ==
Gao argued that Chinese has three major layers, he saw the root of Chinese as coming from a common Sino-Uralic source, the second layer coming from Indo-European during the Chalcolithic age or later and the third layer coming from Yeniseian during the Bronze Age. Jingyi Gao presented the theory as an alternative to the commonly accepted Sino-Tibetan language family. Gao argued that there are multiple problems with the Sino-Tibetan language family and that similarities between Sinitic and Tibeto-Burman are better explained as being the result of loaning and mutual influence instead of being one language family, although mainstream comparative linguistics has strongly established Sino-Tibetan as a real language family.

Gao argued that the monosyllabic structure of Chinese vocabulary was a later development due to external influences, arguing that the word structure of the Sinitic languages in the past was closer to the Uralic languages. Similarly, Karl August Hermann argued that the monosyllabic word structure in Sinitic is not an obstacle to a linguistic relationship.

== History ==
The earliest known mention of a possible relationship between the Uralic and Sinitic languages was made by Sajnovics in 1770, who raised questions about a possible relation of Chinese and Hungarian, due to some lexical examples which he thought to be similar. Then in 1895, a relation between Sinitic and Uralic was proposed by the Estonian linguist Karl August Hermann. He made a comparison of Estonian, Finnish and Chinese, arguing that they were related, although he also included Altaic (which itself is today generally rejected) in the family. In the modern day its main advocate has been Jingyi Gao, first proposing it in 2005 and later making another book on the topic in 2008 along with making later articles. Estonian academics and linguists such as Ago Künnap, Jaan Kaplinski, Urmas Sutrop and Märt Läänemets along with a few Chinese professors such as Feng Zheng, Li Baojia and Jiang Jicheng have expressed interest over the theory and calling for more studies on the topic. Despite this, they have not endorsed Gao's theory of a Sino-Uralic language family. George van Driem argues that Sino-Uralic along with other theories such as Sino-Indo-European are constructed by using flawed methodologies with inadequate knowledge of historical Chinese and the Trans-Himalayan languages, representing false language families. According to van Driem, the theory is not supported by proper evidence.

Before Gao, Morris Swadesh had already theorized about a relation between Sinitic and Uralic, proposing a more radical and massive Dené-Finnish grouping which encompasses Athabaskan, Uralic and the Sino-Tibetan languages. Swadesh's theory has been called "radical". Another similar large language family including Sinitic and Uralic, was suggested by Karl Bouda in 1950, his theory included: Sino-Tibetan, Uralic, Yeniseian, Austronesian and others being distantly related.

== See also ==
- Uralo-Siberian languages
- Ural-Altaic languages
- Haplogroup NO
