= Helios (encyclopedia) =

General knowledge Greek encyclopedia

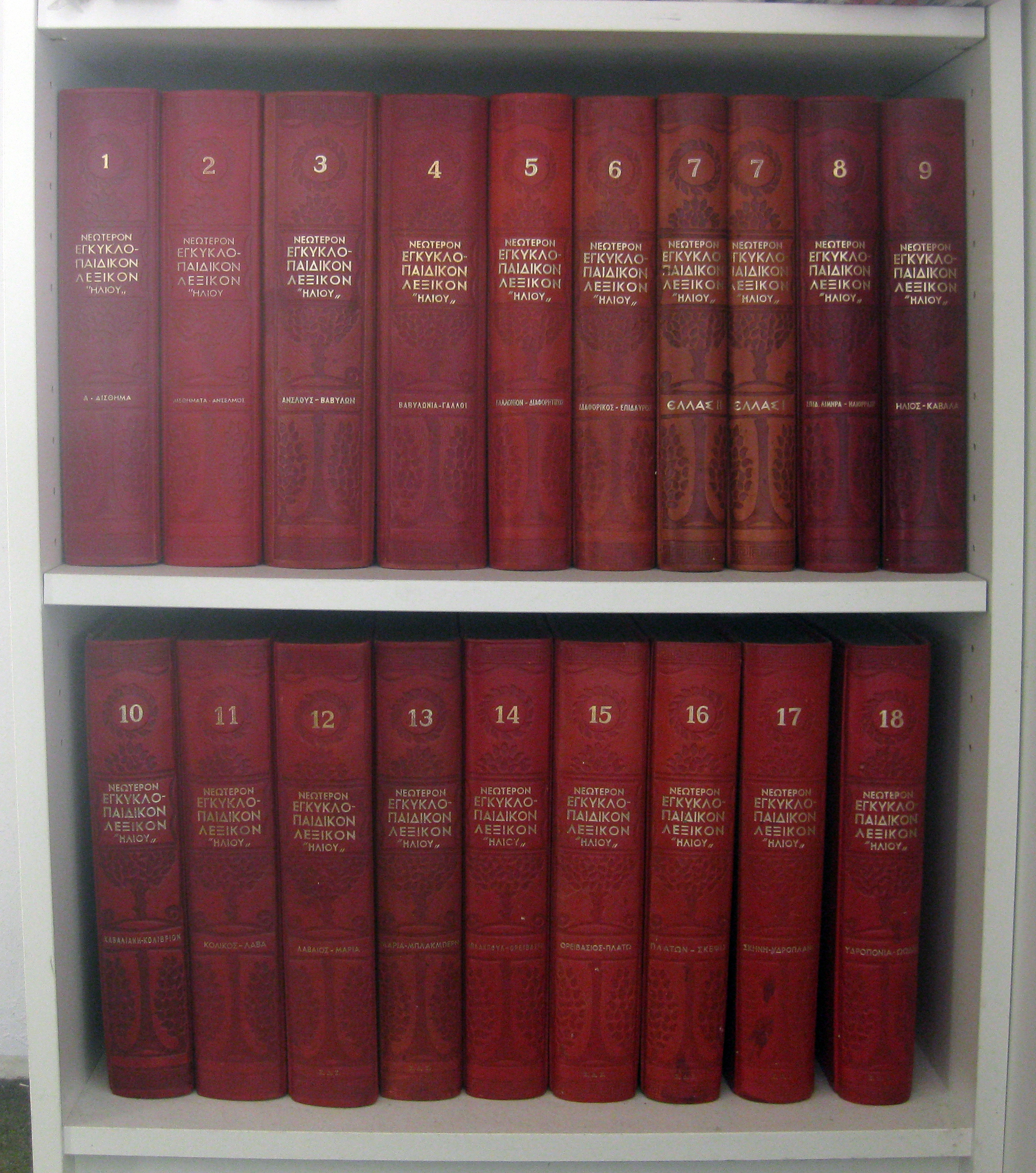
The books, note that one is divided in two parts

Helios, more fully the Helios New Encyclopedic Dictionary (Greek: Νεώτερο Εγκυκλοπαιδικό Λεξικό Ηλίου or: Νεώτερον Εγκυκλοπαιδικόν Λεξικόν Ήλιος), is a general knowledge Greek encyclopaedia. Its publication commenced in 1945 while its second edition was completed in 1960, comprising a total of 18 volumes.

== See also ==
- List of Greek encyclopedias
