= Gran Enciclopedia de Andalucía =

Encyclopedia of Andalusia

Gran Enciclopedia de Andalucía is a Spanish encyclopedia focused in Andalusia region. It has 10 volumes, and it was coordinated by José María Javierre and Manuel Ángel Vázquez Medel.

Junta de Andalucía bought the encyclopedia in 1985.

== See also ==
- List of encyclopedias by language
