= Ensiklopedi Umum dalam Bahasa Indonesia =

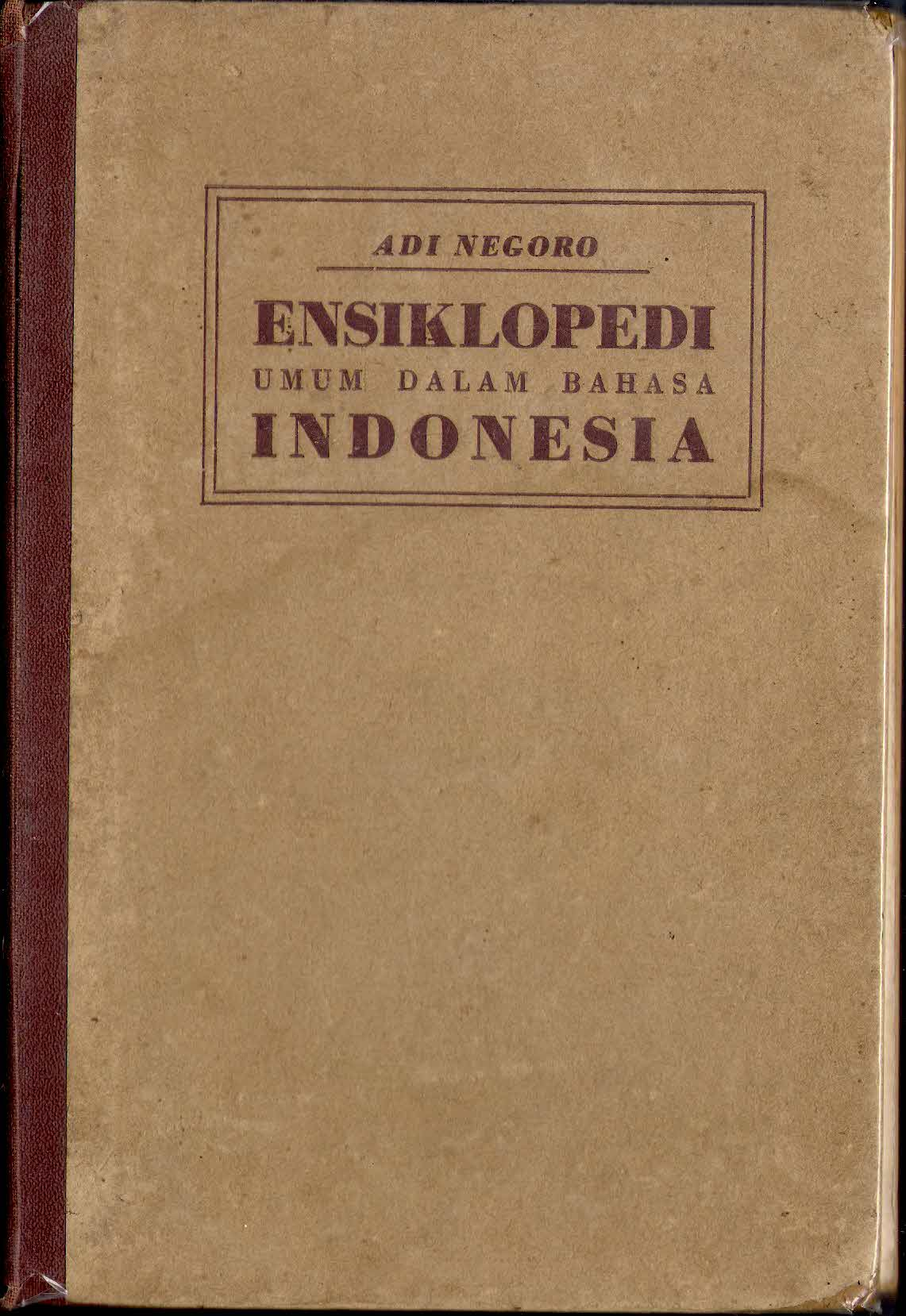
Cover

Ensiklopedi umum dalam bahasa Indonesia (English: General encyclopedia in the Indonesian language) is a single volume Indonesian-language general encyclopedia published in 1954 by Bulan Bintang. It was written solely by Adi Negoro. It is claimed to be the second Indonesian encyclopedia that was the work of a single person.

It consists of 404 pages and contains around 2,200 entries.

After that, in 1955 Ensiklopedia Indonesia by Todung Sunan Gunung Mulia was published by publisher W. van Hoeve, Bandung (not to be confused by 1980's Ensiklopedi Indonesia published by Ichtiar Baru van Hoeve, Jakarta).

== See also ==
- List of encyclopedias by language#Indonesian
