= Great Korean Encyclopedia =

Encyclopedia published in North Korea

The Great Korean Encyclopedia (Korean: 조선 대백과 사전) is a 30-volume encyclopedia published in North Korea. It includes more than 100,000 lemmas, 25,000 visual aids and photos, and more than 5,200 biographical names.

== History ==
The project started as a result of "special interest and direct guidance" from Kim Il Sung in 1964 and "compilation committee" for the encyclopedia existed from 1988. First book of the series was published in October 1995(The article wrongly quotes the year as 1955). The 30 volumes were completed by 2002.

== Monitoring of content ==
The content of the book is known to be heavily discussed by the party before it is published, and thus most of the evaluations reflect the official opinions of the party. For example, the book has an article about Ernest Hemingway, but records of how he died (suicide) is not published.

== Digital version ==
The digital version of the dictionary was open to the public in 2010. However, it is more likely to be for people outside North Korea or the elites.

== Mobile app ==
The encyclopedia was provided as an app for the North Korean smartphone Pyongyang Touch in 2018, and it was the app with the most information in the whole device.

== See also ==
- Kwangmyong Encyclopedia
- Lists of encyclopedias
