= María Elisa Álvarez Obaya =

Spanish pharmacist known for identifying the origin of a mass poisoning case

- Born: January 12, 1934; Villaviciosa, Spanish Republic
- Died: 26 February 2010 (aged 76); Las Palmas, Spain
- Education: University of Santiago de Compostela; University of Barcelona
- Occupation: Pharmacist
- Awards: Carracido Medal (1965); Civil Health Order (1965)

María Elisa Álvarez Obaya (12 January 1934 – 26 February 2010) was a Spanish pharmacist known for identifying the origin of a mass poisoning case.

== Biography ==
María Elisa Álvarez Obaya was born in Villaviciosa, Asturias on 12 January 1934. She studied pharmacy at the University of Santiago de Compostela and the University of Barcelona, graduating in 1961.

After receiving her degree, she moved to Haría, Lanzarote, where she ran a pharmacy. In January 1962 she became the municipal pharmaceutical inspector.

Later, she became a researcher in the laboratories of the pharmaceutical inspector of Las Palmas. She worked there until her death on 26 February 2010.

== Methanol poisoning case ==
In 1963, when she had been Haría's municipal pharmaceutical inspector for one year, Álvarez uncovered an infamous poisoning case. After three Lanzarote residents died and two suddenly went blind, she determined that all had recently consumed alcoholic drinks from a particular winery. She ordered all of the company's products seized from local shops and bars. By analyzing the contents of bottles, carafes, and barrels in her pharmacy's small laboratory, she discovered that the patients had been victims of methanol toxicity. She sent samples to the Las Palmas Health Department, which confirmed her findings.

Her investigation led to the conviction of an alcohol merchant from Ourense and ten others who had been involved in selling drinks adulterated with dangerous amounts of methyl alcohol, a toxic chemical compound used as antifreeze, solvent, and fuel, across Galicia and the Canary Islands. Despite the rapid action of María Elisa Álvarez, it is estimated that more than 50 people died and that dozens lost their vision as a result.

== Honors ==
In recognition of her work in the "Methyl Case", Álvarez received tributes from the College of Pharmacists of Las Palmas and that of Asturias. In 1965, during the First National Assembly of Pharmacists, held in Lloret de Mar, she received the Civil Health Order with a plaque from the General Council of Pharmacists. The same year, the Real Academia Nacional de Farmacia awarded her the ninth Carracido Medal, in its Bronze category.

In 2016 the Haría City Council dedicated a plaque in her honor.
