= Jamaat-ul-Muslimeen =

Pakistan-based Islamic organization

- جماعت المسلمین
- Formation: 1962-01-01
- Founder: Masood Ahmed (died 1997)
- Type: NGO; Religious
- Headquarters: Karachi, Sindh
- Location: Pakistan
- Secretary General: Musaddaq Sarfraz
- Ameer: Syed Zain-ul-Abideen
- Website: www.aljamaat.org

Jamaat-ul-Muslimeen (Arabic/Urdu: جماعة المسلمين), literally translated as "Group or party of Muslims", is a Pakistani religious organization. Based in Karachi, Sindh, Pakistan, it was founded by Masood Ahmad in January 1962. The present leader of the organization is Syed Zain ul Abideen, who is the ameer after the death of Mohammad Ishtiaq in 2024. Muhammad Ishtiaq died on 27 November 2024.

Jamaat-ul-Muslimeen closely resembles the Ahl-i Hadith sect in their insistence upon the primary sources of an original monotheistic Islam and a total rejection of fiqh.

== Criticism by Sunnis ==
Sunni scholars accuse Jamaat al-Muslimeen of misinterpreting certain Qur'anic texts and hadiths. They assert that the founder Masood Ahmad expressed his personal opinions, overlooking the works and understandings of other mainstream Muslim scholars.

== Publications ==
- Soam-ul-Muslimeen — by Masood Ahmed (B.Sc.)
- Zakat-ul-Muslimeen — by Masood Ahmed (B.Sc.)
- Hajj-ul-Muslimeen — by Masood Ahmed (B.Sc.)
- Zehan Parasti — by Masood Ahmed (B.Sc.)
- Minhaj ul Muslimeen — by Masood Ahmed (B.Sc.)
- Talash-e-Haq — by Masood Ahmed (B.Sc.)
- Tauheed-ul-Muslimeen — by Masood Ahmed (B.Sc.)
- At-Tehqeeq Fi Jawab At-Taqleed — by Masood Ahmed (B.Sc.)
- Burhan-ul-Muslimeen — by Masood Ahmed (B.Sc.)
- Da'awat-ul-Muslimeen — by Masood Ahmed (B.Sc.)
- Salat-ul-Muslimeen — by Masood Ahmed (B.Sc.)
- Tafheem-e-Islam — by Masood Ahmed (B.Sc.)
- Taareekh-e-Mutawwal — by Masood Ahmed (B.Sc.)
- Tareekh-e-Islam — by Masood Ahmed (B.Sc.)
- Tafseer-e-Quran (10 volumes) — by Masood Ahmed (B.Sc.)
