= Võhmanõmme =

Village in Estonia

Coordinates: 58°40′N 26°01′E

- Village
- Interactive map of Võhmanõmme
- Country: Estonia
- County: Jõgeva County
- Parish: Põltsamaa Parish
- Time zone: UTC+2 (EET)
  - Summer (DST): UTC+3 (EEST)

Võhmanõmme is a village in Põltsamaa Parish, Jõgeva County in eastern Estonia.

Võhmanõmme is the birthplace of writer, publicist, linguist and composer Karl August Hermann (1851–1909).
