= Albanian Encyclopedic Dictionary =

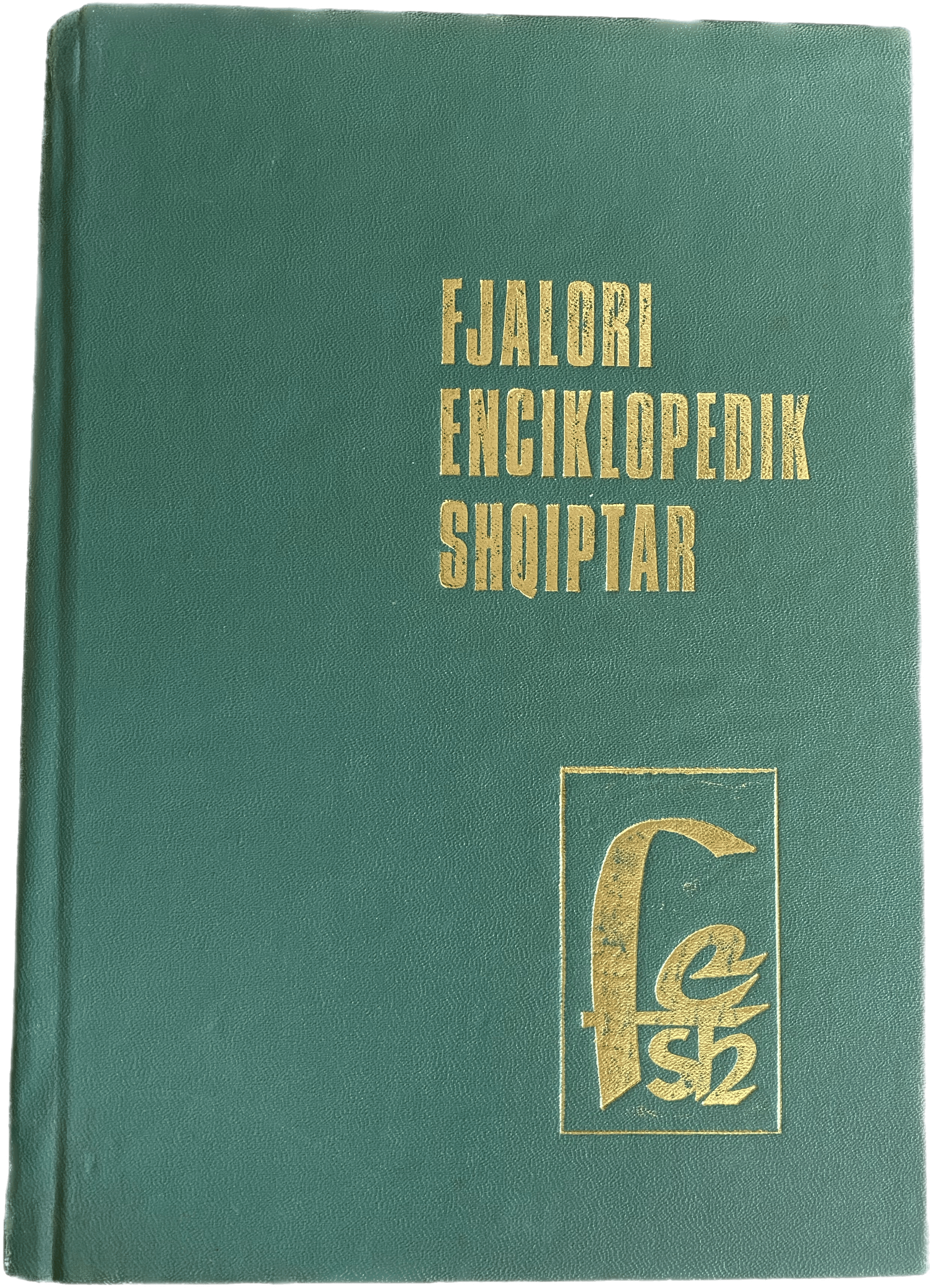
- 1st edition cover of FESh
- Editor: Emil Lafe
- Language: Albanian
- Release number: II
- Publisher: Academy of Sciences of Albania (ASH)
- Publication date: 2008–2009
- Publication place: Albania
- Pages: Vol.I: 873, Vol.II: 930, Vol.III: 1258
- ISBN: 978-99956-10-27-2

The Albanian Encyclopedic Dictionary (Albanian: Fjalori Enciklopedik Shqiptar – FESh) is a comprehensive encyclopedic work compiled and published by the Academy of Sciences of Albania.

Containing over 7,200 entries, it covers a broad spectrum of knowledge and human activity, with an extensive array of topics, from biographies and historical events to scientific disciplines, cultural subjects and the arts. The dictionary includes entries on countries, ethnic groups, ideologies, literature, geography, philosophy, chemistry, physics, music, sports and more, all accompanied by black-and-white photographs and illustrations that enhance its informative scope.

== Overview ==
=== First edition (1985) ===
When the first Albanian Encyclopedic Dictionary (FESh) was published in 1985 under the aegis of the Academy of Sciences in Tirana, led by Aleks Buda, it marked a milestone in Albanian scholarly publishing. The 1,248-page single-volume lexicon offered a concise portrayal of everything deemed important about Albania and the Albanian people, viewed strictly through the lens of the Communist Party leadership.

Although rich in factual content, its lack of impartiality was particularly evident in biographical entries, which served as a curated pantheon of officially sanctioned historical and cultural figures. Prominent individuals who had fallen out of favor – such as Mehmet Shehu, King Zog, Faik Konica and Gjergj Fishta – were either omitted or presented in a negative light.

Originally conceived as the basis for a larger, multi-volume work, the project remained a single volume for decades. Nearly 23 years later, its successor would emerge in the form of a 3,061-page three-volume edition, featuring nearly twice the content, though in a slightly smaller format. While the first edition included around 5,000 entries, the revised FESh II expanded to approximately 7,200, ranging from words such as Abaci (Abbey) to Zhytër (Common pochard – a species of duck). Biographical entries rose from 700 to about 2,300, prompting considerable debate over inclusion and presentation.

=== Second edition (2008–2009) ===
The newer edition offered a clearer national perspective, giving greater attention to Kosovo, Albanian communities in the former Yugoslavia and the Albanian diaspora as a whole. Foreign albanologists were also better represented, from linguists and cultural historians to scientists such as the botanist Friedrich Markgraf. As expected in such works, recent scholarly disputes were largely absent due to editorial lead times.

The dictionary was over a decade in the making. It involved 21 editorial teams and a central board of nearly 50 members, under the direction of former Academy president Ylli Popa. Core editorial work was carried out by a six-person team at the Centre for Albanological Studies, with oversight from linguist Emil Lafe. This heavily layered editorial structure produced inefficiencies and that the need for brevity resulted in significant omissions.

To keep costs low (5,000 ALL), the dictionary was printed domestically, but this came at the expense of production quality. Images were small and poorly reproduced and the maps offered little improvement over those found in the 1985 edition.

Each entry credits its author, with no mention of any bibliographic references. Birth and death years in biographical entries are inconsistently appended. One persistent issue in Albanian academic publishing is the forced and sometimes incorrect, transliteration of foreign names – for example, “Hekard” instead of Hecquard.

Despite its shortcomings, FESh II stands as a major scholarly achievement and an essential reference of Albanian academic and cultural development.
