= Eesti Üleüldise teaduse raamat ehk encyklopädia konversationi-lexikon =

Estonian-language encyclopedia

Eesti Üleüldise teaduse raamat ehk encyklopädia konversationi-lexikon is an Estonian encyclopedia, written by Karl August Hermann between 1900 and 1906. Only two volumes (1903, 1906) were published before Hermann died in 1909.
