= WebTeb =

WebTeb Ltd.
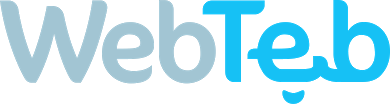
- Founded: 2011
- Website: www.webteb.com
- Services: Health Information
- Founder: Mahmoud Kaiyal
- Key People: Majed Abukhater (CEO)
- Headquarters: Dubai, United Arab Emirates
- Number of Employees: 1-50
- Number of Users: ~8000000

WebTeb (Arabic: ويب طب) is an Arab internet website that produces and publishes medical, health news and information and lifestyle through various tools and topics such as symptom diagnosis, diseases, and medicines, as well as articles on medicine, health, beauty and some aspects of pregnancy and childbirth. WebTeb was founded in 2011 by Dr. Mahmoud Kayal to provide the Arabic speakers with the information, tools, and applications to accompany them and be a health and lifestyle reference in their life.

== Traffic ==
WebTeb began by providing specialized information on diseases, drugs, treatments, and surgery, to articles and news related to various health and medical fields. WebTeb now has dedicated sections such as Medicine, Health, Beauty, Pregnancy, and Childbirth. It also provides a community platform that helps users interact with each other, as well as their mobile application: WebTeb general medicine application.

== History ==
WebTeb's contents source are from Harvard University and Mayo Clinic. WebTeb’s website has 7.8 million monthly users, 30 million monthly views and interaction across different platforms such as computers and smart devices.

== Awards and achievements ==
WebTeb achieved the following awards:

- First place in Sheikh Ali Al-Sabah Award for Best Applications.
- Third place in HH Sheikh Al Ali Al Sabah Award for best websites
- Ranked first in the Mohammed bin Rashid Al Maktoum Award for the most influential social platforms.
- Ranked 13th in the ranking of Forbes for the 100 strongest Arab startups.
