= Minhaj ul Muslimeen =

Islamic encyclopedia for all the matters in the life of a Muslim

- Author: Syed Masood Ahmed
- Original title: منہاج المسلمین
- Language: Urdu
- Subject: Islamic Encyclopedia
- Genre: Non-fiction
- Publisher: Jamaat-ul-Muslimeen
- Publication place: Pakistan
- Media type: Print (Hardcover & Paperback)
- Pages: 845

Minhaj ul Muslimeen (The Way of the Muslims) is a comprehensive Islamic encyclopedia published by Idara Matboo’at-e-Islamia under the auspices of Jamaat-ul-Muslimeen. It is a codified encyclopedia of Islamic teachings, addressing the principles and guidelines of Islam for every stage of life, from birth to death. Rooted in the Qur’an and authentic (Sahih or Hasan) Ahadith, the book aims to provide an unaltered, evidence-based understanding of Islamic commands.

The text emphasizes that Islam, as a divine and complete way of life, governs all aspects of human existence. It rejects any modifications, innovations, or human opinions that contradict or supplement Allah’s guidance. Wherever divine commandments conclude, worldly matters begin. The book underscores that no human being has the authority to amend Allah's laws or create equivalent religious rulings.

Minhaj-ul-Muslimeen includes references to Qur’anic verses and authentic Ahadith in their original Arabic text, along with their sources, to ensure clarity and authenticity. Readers are invited to report any potential oversight or weak Hadith, ensuring continuous improvement in future editions.

The book reflects the commitment to providing a pure and unadulterated understanding of Islam, steering Muslims towards the Sirat al-Mustaqim (the Straight Path).It is also available for download in PDF format from the internet.

Authored by the late Syed Masood Ahmed (Rahimahullah), Minhaj-ul-Muslimeen remains a pivotal resource for individuals seeking the pristine guidance of Islam.
