= Global World Encyclopedia =

South Korean Korean-language encyclopedia

Global World Encyclopedia (Korean: 글로벌 세계 대백과사전) is a Korean language encyclopedia which was published by Bohemian Publishing Company in 2004. Nearly 1500 experts wrote around 138,000 articles about literature, history, science, culture, law, philosophy, thought, technology and so on. On November 4, 2008, Daum acquired its license and donated it to Wikipedia.
