= Pyongyang Touch =

North Korean smartphone line

- Manufacturer: Local vendor
- Type: Smartphone
- First released: 2014
- Compatible networks: 2G GSM; 3G UMTS
- Operating system: Android Oreo (latest version used in Pyongyang 2428)
- CPU: Mediatek MT6575 SoC; MT6575: Core, 40nm ARM Cortex-A9 1GHz CPU
- GPU: IT PowerVR SGX531
- Memory: 8GB RAM
- Storage: 32GB
- Battery: 1,450 mAh
- Rear camera: 2 megapixel
- Front camera: 2 megapixel
- Data inputs: Multi-touch, capacitive touchscreen Push buttons
- Other: FM Radio supports with headphone jack

The Pyongyang Touch (Korean: 평양 타치) is a line of smartphone, with its first version launched in North Korea in 2014 and likely produced by the Chinese company Uniscope. It is named after the capital of the country, Pyongyang. Not much is known about the technical data, but the phone is believed to run a modified version of Android. Externally, it resembles the iPhone 3G and is available in white, pink, and blue. Since access to the Internet is denied to a large part of the population in North Korea, there is only access to the Intranet Kwangmyong. It is particularly popular among the younger population, according to Choson Sinbo.

== Models ==
=== Pyongyang 2418 ===
The device has a "panorama" function and had a flashlight app as default. The user can use Photoshop to edit photos they take with the phone's camera. The phone also offers medical self-diagnosis services and scientific agricultural apps.

=== Pyongyang 2421 ===
The device included a security feature that did not work properly.

=== Pyongyang 2423 ===
The device is able to make Word documents, Excel files and PowerPoints. According to a report by The Stimson Center, the device (along with the Pyongyang 2413) has been jailbroken by North Korean citizens to circumvent surveillance measures and media restrictions on the devices.

=== Pyongyang 2425 ===
The device includes wireless charging, an advanced camera, and facial recognition.

=== Pyongyang 2428 ===
The device uses Android 8.1 as its operating system.
