= Karl August Hermann =

Estonian journalist and composer (1851–1909)

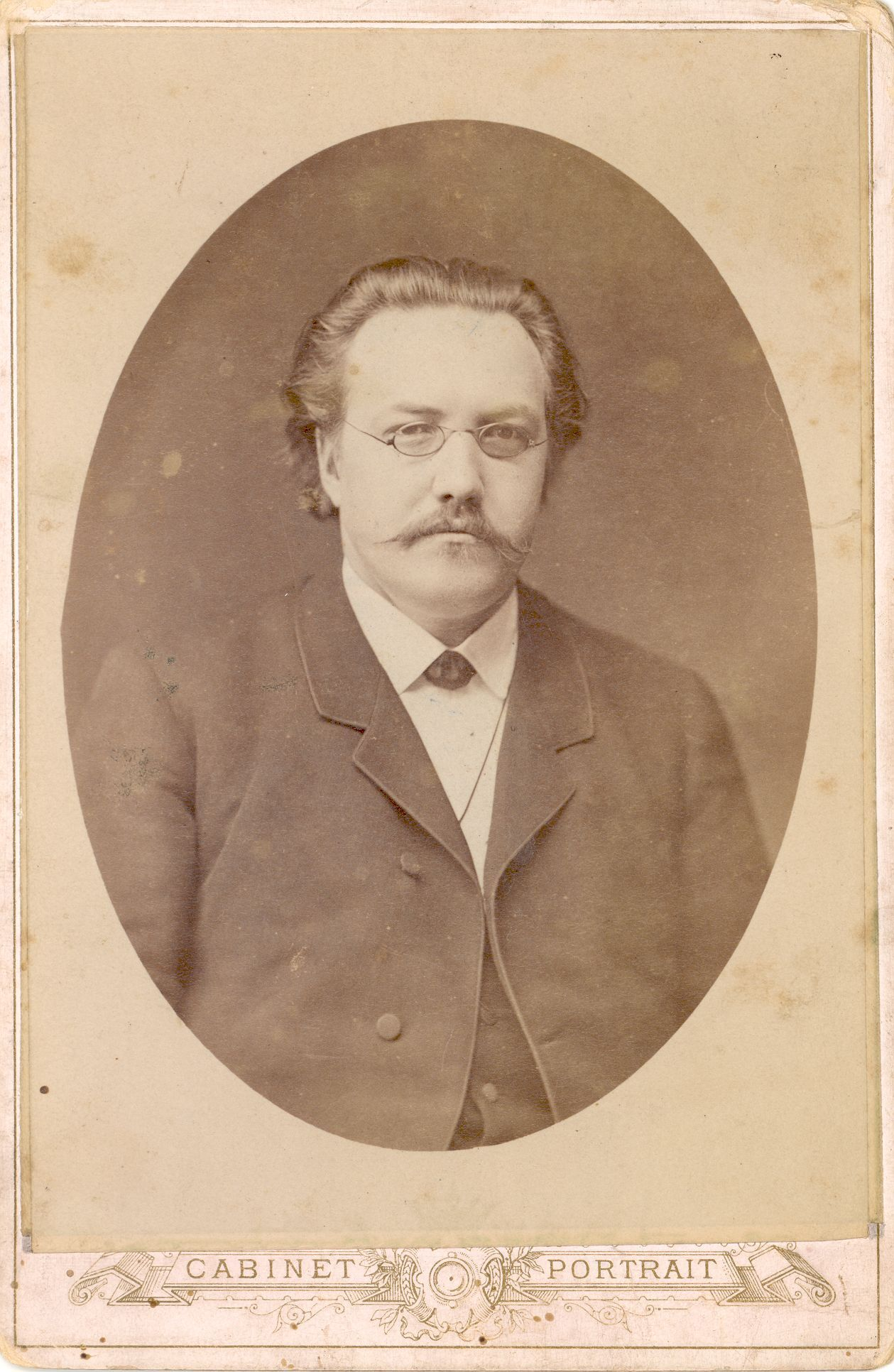

Karl August Hermann (23 September 1851 – 11 January 1909) was an Estonian writer, publicist, linguist and composer.

== Biography ==
Hermann was born on 23 September 1851, in Võhmanõmme, Põltsamaa Parish, Kreis Fellin (present-day Jõgeva County, Estonia). He studied at the Faculty of Theology of the University of Tartu from 1875. He studied linguistics at Leipzig University from 1878, graduating in 1880 and defending his PhD thesis, Der einfache Wortstamm und die drei Lautstufen in der estnischen Sprache (The simple stem and three phonetic levels in the Estonian language).

From 1882 to 1885, Hermann was an editor for Eesti Postimees. In 1886, he acquired the newspaper Perno Postimees, renaming it Postimees, which began publication in Tartu. In 1906, he acquired the newspaper Valgus.

Hermann belonged to the Society of Estonian Literati and was an honorary alumnus of the Estonian Students' Society.

Hermann died on 11 January 1909, aged 57, in Tartu, and is buried in Tartu Raadi Cemetery.

== Works ==
In 1884, Hermann published Eesti keele grammatika (Estonian Grammar). In 1900 he started to publish Eesti Üleüldise teaduse raamat ehk encyklopädia konversationi-lexikon, but only the first volume was published in full.

Hermann composed around 300 choral songs, including "Kungla rahvas" ('Kungla people') and "Oh laula ja hõiska" ('O sing and shout').

In 1895, Hermann published a book in which he argued that Sino-Uralic and Altaic form one large linguistic family.
