= Sarvavijnanakosam =

Malayalam encyclopedia

- Language: Malayalam
- Subject: General
- Genre: Reference encyclopedia
- Publisher: State Institute of Encyclopaedic Publications
- Publication date: 1972-present
- Publication place: India
- Website: http://web-edition.sarvavijnanakosam.gov.in

Sarvavijnanakosam, known in English as the Malayalam Encyclopaedia, is a general encyclopedia in the Malayalam language. It is intended to be "a compendium of world knowledge", covering over 32,000 topics. The first volume was published in 1972, and in 2015 sixteenth volume was published. In total 20 volumes are expected to be published. It is published by the State Institute of Encyclopaedic Publications. The encyclopedia received a national award for best reference book in 1979, and volume 12 received the Dravidian Linguists' Association award for best educational book of 2003.

== Web edition ==
A web edition was launched in June 2008, which contains articles included in volumes 12, 13 and 15 of Sarvavijnanakosam as well as those in the revised editions of the first two volumes. The site uses a MediaWiki platform which allows the public to contribute.

== See also ==
- Viswasahityavijnanakosam, an encyclopedia of world literature in the Malayalam language
- Malayalam Wikipedia
