= The Arabic Encyclopedia =

Arabic encyclopedia published in Syria

The Arabic Encyclopedia الموسوعة العربية
- Language: Arabic
- Series: 24 volumes
- Genre: Encyclopedia
- Publication date: 1998: First Edition
- Publication place: Syria
- Website: arab-ency.com.sy

The Arabic Encyclopedia (Arabic: الموسوعة العربية) is an encyclopedia in 24 volumes in the Arabic language, published by the government of Syria.

== History ==
In 1953, the government of Syria proposed the project to the Arab League that adopted a resolution to set up "The Arabic Encyclopedia". Another proposal for an "Arabic Encyclopedia" was submitted to the Arab League in 1961. However, the project was not implemented for unidentified reasons. Syria adopted a resolution to establish the 'Institute of the Arabic Encyclopedia' (IAE) (Arabic: هيئة الموسوعة العربية) in 1981.

The first edition of the encyclopedia was published in 1998, with this and all further volumes distributed by Dar al-Fikr publishers in Damascus. In 2016, the official website was launched. It allows free online access to all the entries of the encyclopedia. After completion, the comprehensive encyclopedia comprises twenty-two volumes. In addition, there is a special volume of terms in the three languages Arabic, English and French, as well as a special volume for the index.
