= Kwangmyong Encyclopedia =

Encyclopedia published in North Korea

The Kwangmyong Encyclopedia (Korean: 광명백과사전) is a 20-volume encyclopedia published in North Korea. It includes more than 58,000 entries and 9,000 photos, pictures and maps.

== History ==
The prep work for the encyclopedia began in 2004. The encyclopedia has been published since 2006, and was completed in 2013.

== Content ==
Contents of Book are as follows:

Book 1: History of Korea
Book 2: World History
Book 3: Politics & Law
Book 4: Philosophy
Book 5: Economy
Book 6: Literature & Arts
Book 7: Education, Language, Publishing, Broadcasting
Book 8: Korean Geography
Book 9: World geography
Book 10: Mathematics
Book 11: Physics
Book 12: Chemistry
Book 13: Biology
Book 14: Astronomy, Environment
Book 15: Information, Aviation & Nanotechnology
Book 16: Mining, Metal, Machinery & Electronics
Book 17: Chemical Engineering, Light Industries, Construction, Transport & Postal Services
Book 18: Agriculture, Forestry & fishery
Book 19: The Human Body & Health
Book 20: Physical Education

== See also ==
- Great Korean Encyclopedia
- Lists of encyclopedias
