= Spanish methanol poisonings =

Methanol poisonings in Spain (Spanish: Caso del metílico) took place in early 1963, when an alcohol merchant Rogelio Aguiar from Ourense, Galicia, Spain sold drinks containing dangerous amounts of methanol. One glass of drink was enough to kill or blind. Official count of victims is 51 dead and 9 blind, but estimates of number of victims vary between 1,000 and 5,000 dead.

Rogelio Aguiar acquired 75,000 litres of methanol, which it used to produce mixed drinks. The deal was very beneficial, as methanol was much cheaper than real ethyl alcohol. Rogelio Aguiar sold methanol to company from Vigo called "Lago e Hijos".

First deaths were observed on Lanzarote in February. The municipal pharmaceutical inspector, María Elisa Álvarez Obaya, started to think about possibility of poisoning, when she noticed four victims had been in the same party. She analyzed their drinks and confirmed this was a case of methanol poisoning. Even though the pharmacist published warnings, more people were poisoned, and altogether 16 people died on Canary Islands of Lanzarote, La Gomera and Tenerife. Meanwhile, on mainland Spain in Galicia new deaths were recorded daily.

The businessmen were sentenced to 1–20 years in jail for endangering public health. The victims were supposed to get compensation, but due to bankruptcies they did not receive the money.

Galician journalist and writer Fernando Rodríguez Méndez investigated this case for five years and published several books that have returned this story of money, poison and death to the present.
