= The Peoplepedia =

1996 non-fiction book by Les Krantz and Jim McCormick

The Peoplepedia: The Ultimate Reference on the American People
- Cover of 1996 hardback ed.
- Author: Les Krantz and Jim McCormick
- Language: English
- Genre: Reference work
- Publisher: Henry Holt and Company
- Publication date: 1996
- Publication place: United States
- ISBN: 0805037276
- OCLC: 32468218

The Peoplepedia: The Ultimate Reference on the American People is a 1996 book by Les Krantz and Jim McCormick. Covering "Americans and their habits...from serious to silly", it "purports to illuminate 'who we are and how we see ourselves'". It was written in three parts providing "statistical snapshots of American life": "The American Mindset" with popular opinions; "The American Collective" with facts about broad categories such as education or religion; and "Notable Americans" with biographical sketches. A review said it was "entertaining but, in some places, deceptive" and concentrated on men's biographies over women.
