= Agropedia =

Former website

agropedia
- Available in: English, Hindi
- Owner: National Agricultural Innovation Project
- Website: agropedia.iitk.ac.in; agropedia.net
- Launched: January 12, 2009
- Current status: Not active. Browsing still possible.

Agropedia was an online knowledge repository for information related to agriculture in India. It included universal meta models and localized content for a variety of users with appropriate interfaces built in collaborative mode in multiple languages. This national portal, designed as an "agricultural Wikipedia" hosts wide range of agricultural information on a variety of crops, with an aim to empower farmers with crop information.

Backed by Government of India and sponsored by the World Bank through the National Agricultural Innovation Project of the Indian Council of Agricultural Research (ICAR), the open access online resource project was launched on 12 January 2009. Eventually it aims to use weekly alerts from scientists on different crops, to send text messages to farmers across India.

== Development ==
Originally titled "Agropedia Indica", the development of the project was undertaken by team involving various premier institution of India, and spearheaded by Professor Jayantha Chatterjee, of Indian Institute of Technology Kanpur (IIT Kanpur). It was initially envisioned by T. V. Prabhakar also of IIT Kanpur, over three years before, who remained its lead architect.

The project is nurtured under the aegis of the National Agricultural Innovation Project (NAIP) to accelerate technology-led pro-poor growth and diffusion of new technologies for improving agricultural yield and rural livelihood in India. It is a collaborative project of seven consortium partners' viz. ICRISAT- Hyderabad, NAARM- Hyderabad, IIT Kanpur, IIT Bombay, GBPUAT- Pantnagar, UAS- Raichur and IIITM-Kerala. ICRISAT is the Consortium coordinator which works as a channel for communication and overall facilitation. IITK develops the software architecture and deploys it complete with user interface. Content will be provided by the implementing partners, GBPUAT, UAS-Raichur and ICRISAT. IITB and IIITM-Kerala have assured to provide some content through certain web services. The resources of NAARM could be used to introduce and popularize the agropedia.

== Partners ==
Information and Communication Technology (ICT) Resource Institutions

- Indian Institute of Technology Kanpur (IIT Kanpur)
- Indian Institute of Technology Bombay (IIT Bombay)
- Indian Institute of Information Technology and Management, Thiruvananthapuram (IIITM-K)
- National Academy of Agricultural Research Management (NAARM), (Indian Council of Agricultural Research)

Agricultural Information and Learning Resources

- Govind Ballabh Pant University of Agriculture & Technology, Pantnagar
- University of Agricultural Sciences, Dharwad (UASD)

Interface Partner

- International Crops Research Institute for the Semi-Arid Tropics (ICRISAT)
