= Encyclopedia of Albanian Art =

The Encyclopedia of Albanian Art or Enciklopedia e Artit Shqiptar is an encyclopedia that specialises in coverage in Albania, Kosovo, Macedonia, Montenegro and in the Albanian diaspora. It combines knowledge on a wide range of Albanian art, from painting and sculpture to cinema and theatre.

== Contributors ==
A number of authors have contributed to the encyclopedia including Josef Papagjoni, Zana Shuteriqi, Ferid Hudhri, Moikom Zeqo, Jakup Mato and Kristaq Dhamo in Albania. The encyclopedia is the first of its kind in Albania, an ambitious project which will eventually be published in six to eight volumes.

The publication is a product of the Center of Studies of Art, part of the Albanian Academy of Sciences. The encyclopedia has a board of 10 people, including some of the most prominent scholars in their fields. The board are also the most active contributors to the encyclopedia

In October 2007 about 1000 or so pages had been made ready for publication.
