= Mawdoo3 =

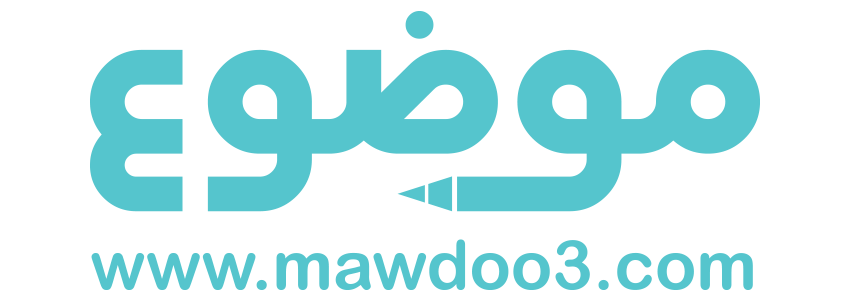

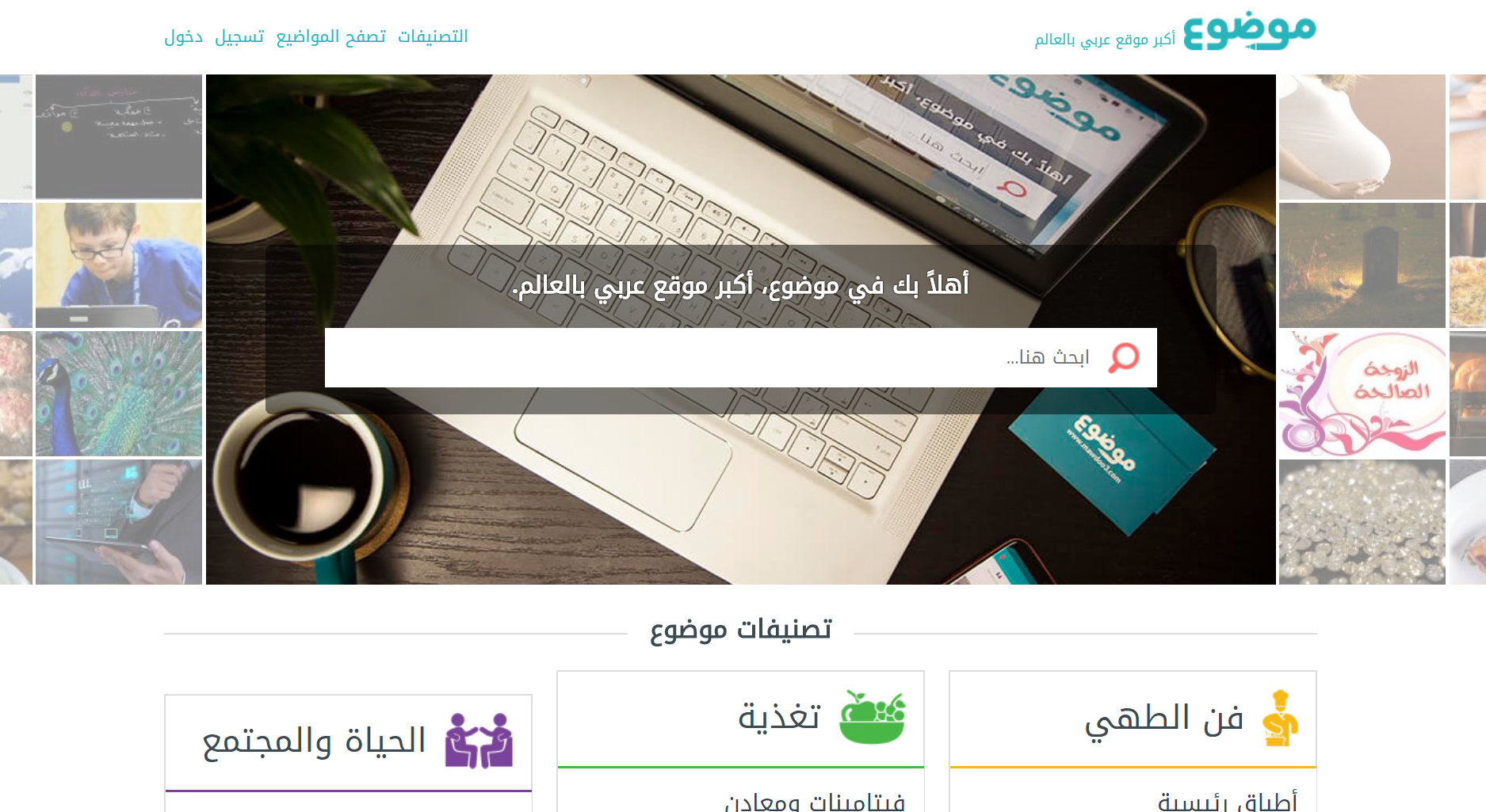
- The Home Page in Mawdoo3
- Website type: Internet content publisher
- Available in: Arabic
- Owners: Mohammad Jaber and Rami Al Qawasmi
- Revenue: $289,000 (2018)
- Website: mawdoo3.com
- Commercial: Yes
- Current status: Active
- Written in: wiki

Mawdoo3 (in Arabic: موضوع Mawḍūʿ; meaning "Subject") is an online Arabic content publisher based in Amman, Jordan. It was established in 2010 by Mohammad Jaber and Rami Al Qawasmi, and launched in 2012. The company claims to be the world's largest Arabic website.

The company expanded its online content with over 140k articles to date. In 2011, it won the first prize for the Queen Rania National Entrepreneurship Award for the category of universities and academics in 2011.

In March 2018, Mawdoo3 also launched a speaking digital assistant called Salma.

== History ==
=== Establishment ===
Mohammed Jaber, who, when he was studying at the Hashemite University in Jordan, said: "The idea of the project came in late 2009 from reading a book about e-marketing during my summer vacation, which prompted me to read further. I bought three specialized books and read them, which revealed to me the opportunity to build a project to develop a keyword analysis service in Arabic".

In 2010, Jaber and Rami al-Qawasmi founded Mawdoo3 with their private money and that of family and friends. The startup won the first prize for the Queen Rania Business Plan Competition Award in 2011, while the founders were students. It was launched in 2010.

=== Investments and partnerships ===
In August 2015, Mawdoo3 announced that it had received US$1.5 million in Series A funding from Dubai-based investor "EquiTrust" (Choueiri Group former corporate investment arm) as a result of a remarkable increase in the traffic with more than 20 million visits per month, of which 12 million are unique with a majority of the traffic coming from Saudi Arabia, followed by Egypt and Jordan.This funding was to be invested in supporting Arabic content and increasing the number of Arabic pages on the Internet as per the announcement.

In addition, Mawdoo3 entered into partnerships with a number of publishers and institutions to provide them with high quality content, such as Mutah University, Queen Rania Center for Entrepreneurship, the Islamic World Academy of Sciences, Medical Reference Altibbi, and the technical Arabic Dictionary".

In July 2018, Mawdoo3 announced that it had received $13.5 million in their series B round of funding, led by U.K.-based Kingsway along with U.S. based Endure Capital. In 2018, Mawdoo3 generated $289,000 in revenue.

=== Growth ===
In early 2016, with approximately 17 Million users, Mawdoo3 became the most popular website in Arabic.

In early 2017, Mawdoo3 AI was founded, A fine-tech division of Mawdoo3 with a mission of creating an Arabic speaking conversational agent that answers factoid questions.

In 2018, Mawdoo3 announced reaching 45 million unique users, achieving a growth rate of approximately 43% of what they have in 2016.

== AI ==
In March 2018, Mawdoo3 launched its web-based Arabic NLP toolkit for developers (ai.mawdoo3.com). Adverised features included Automatic diacritization, named entity recognition, coreference resolution, sentiment analysis and Arabic text to speech.

Mawdoo3 NLP toolkit was designed to serve as building components of Mawdoo3 Arabic speaking digital assistant, Salma, that answers factoid questions from Mawdoo3 platform. Salma is planned also to be provided as an Arabic voice interface service for enterprises in sectors like travel, automobile, telecom and electronics.

== Functionality ==
Mawdoo3 uses the wiki system. Mawdoo3.com adopts a centralized operation model to create and upload content. The team is composed of 20 full-time employees, as well as hundreds of writers divided into paid experts and contributors, who write on specific topics according to special content strategy. It publishes original informational articles and rejects opinion, news, and promotional pieces. Prior to publishing, articles are verified and checked for plagiarism.

== Statistics ==
=== Visitors ===
According to the Alexa website (July, 2018), the distribution of the Arab visitors is as follow:

Order	Country	Percent of Visitors
1	Egypt	20.0%
2	Saudi Arabia	14.3%
3	Algeria	13.1%
4	Sudan	9.2%
