= Britannica Malayalam Encyclopedia =

Malayalam translation of Encyclopedia Britannica

Britannica Malayalam Encyclopedia (also known as Malayalam Britannica and Malayalam Encyclopedia) is a reference work in the Malayalam language. Its content is in large part a translation of the Britannica Concise Encyclopædia.

While it won an award from the Federation of Indian Publishers in 2004, a Consumer Court banned the sale of the book because it was found to be an erroneous reference with many factual errors. The court also found that there was unfair trade practice on the part of the publishers, which are DC Books, Kerala and Encyclopædia Britannica India Pvt.Ltd, a subsidiary of Encyclopædia Britannica Inc.
