= State Institute of Encyclopaedic Publications =

Kerala institution promoting Malayalam

The Kerala State Institute of Encyclopaedic Publications
- Formation: 1961; 65 years ago
- Type: Autonomous Institution
- Headquarters: Thiruvananthapuram, Kerala, India
- Chairman: Pinarayi Vijayan
- Vice Chairman: Saji Cheriyan
- Secretary: Mini Antony, IAS
- Director: Dr. Muse Mary George
- Website: Official website

The State Institute of Encyclopaedic Publications (SIEP) is a cultural institution founded in 1961 under the Department of Cultural Affairs, Government of Kerala, India with the objective of disseminating knowledge to the people of Kerala in their pursuit of learning. It was constituted as part of the government policy that Malayalam should be used as the medium of education, administration and judiciary.

SIEP has engaged in the publication of encyclopaedias contributing to the needs of the lay people and also to the professional interests of the specialists. These include the Sarvavijnanakosam, a Malayalam Encyclopaedia, volume 12 of which won the Dravidian Linguists' Association award for the best educational volume of 2003, and An Encyclopaedia of Dravidian Culture. It is the only body in India functioning as a separate institute for the publication of such encyclopaedias.

Other activities of the institute include organising exhibitions about Malayalam culture and publishing software to promote the use of Malayalam in information technology.

== Current products ==
Following are the current books published by SIEP.

- Sarvavijnanakosam, a general reference encyclopedia in Malayalam.
- Viswasahityavijnanakosam, an encyclopedia on world literature in Malayalam.
- A Frontier of Science Series in several volumes covering the developments in Physics, Chemistry, Life Sciences, Computer Science & IT, Astronomy & Space exploration, Geography & Geology, Meteorology, etc.
  - Paristhithivijnanakosam, on life sciences and Environment.
  - Jyothisasthra Vijnanakosam, on Astronomy & Space exploration.
  - Parinama Vijnanakosam, on Evolution.
- Samskarikam, articles on cultural institutions controlled by Government of Kerala.

== Plans ==
- Vijnanakosam on Kerala in one or two volumes which will contain all relevant information about the state - its land, people, history, places of cultural and tourist importance, prominent institutions, etc.
- Vijnanakosam (in single volume) about the folklore, folk games and festivals of Kerala
- Varshika Vijnanakosam, Yearbook
- Keralavijnanakosam, web edition of an encyclopaedia dealing with the diverse aspects of Kerala.
