= Marefa =

Online Arabic encyclopedia

- The front page
- Website type: Reference
- Available in: Interface: Arabic; Content: to be extended to all languages using Arabic script
- Owner: Marefa Foundation
- Creator: Nayel Shafei
- Website: www.marefa.org
- Commercial: No
- Registration: Encouraged
- Launched: 16 February 2007
- Current status: perpetual work-in-progress

Marefa (in Arabic: المعرفة, lit. 'knowledge') is a not-for-profit online encyclopedia project that uses the wiki system to provide a free Arabic encyclopedia similar to Wikipedia. It was set up by Nayel Shafei on February 16, 2007. Sister projects include Manuscript documentation, Sources, Collaborative books, forums, Blogsphere, E-mail accounts (with unlimited storage), Video/Audio library.

In September 2007, Marefa received 25,000 manuscripts and old books, in Arabic script, from the Government of India. These are scanned images of books stored in and around Osmania University, Hyderabad, India. The books are in Arabic, Persian and Ottoman Turkish. Marefa started the electronic publishing of them, immediately, and made them available for free. University of North Carolina (UNC) puts Marefa as one of top eight sources for Arabic Manuscripts, with notable global cultural centers of Arabic heritage, like, Süleymaniye Library, Istanbul, and Azhar University, Cairo. Middle East Librarian Association recommends the Marefa to its members, and its cited Marefa's receipt of 25,000 Arabic and Persian books and manuscripts from the Government of India.

== Multimedia ==
In addition to articles and original manuscripts, Marefa offers a vast variety of multimedia projects for its visitors. On the home page, viewers can find developing news stories from around the world, updated daily. Marefa recently added a video library where visitors can watch clips uploaded by administrators and other visitors.

In Spring 2009, Marefa began offering weekly live Webinar lectures for site visitors. Marefa members and visitors from around the world discuss pressing global issues, on the Webinar, by hooking up webcams and microphones to their computers and communicating with each other in real time. The weekly Webinar features a guest lecturer speaking about his or her area of expertise. Past Webinars have included talks on the Yemeni secession movement, 2009 Iranian national elections, and historic roots of current crisis in Somalia.

Marefa offers e-mail accounts to members who choose to sign up for such service.

== Relationship with Wikipedia ==
The founder of Marefa, Nayel Shafei, was in 2005–06, one of the contributors to Arabic Wikipedia in number of different articles. After what he describes as a takeover of the Arabic Wikipedia that culminated in banning him, he stopped contributing to it, and formed Marefa.

Marefa started with content from several permitting sources including Wikipedia. Marefa uses Wiki-format for its site but provides articles on individuals, issues, and items often not found on the Arabic Wikipedia site. Marefa often uses content from the English and Arabic sites for baseline material, but Marefa provides additional details, sources, images, multimedia, and commentary for articles that may not be found on the Arabic Wikipedia site. Marefa's articles are in Arabic but also have a multilingual linking system in which alternative language editions of a given article in Marefa are linked to Wikipedia editions in those languages.
