= Gran Enciclopedia Galega Silverio Cañada =

Gran Enciclopedia Gallega Silverio Cañada
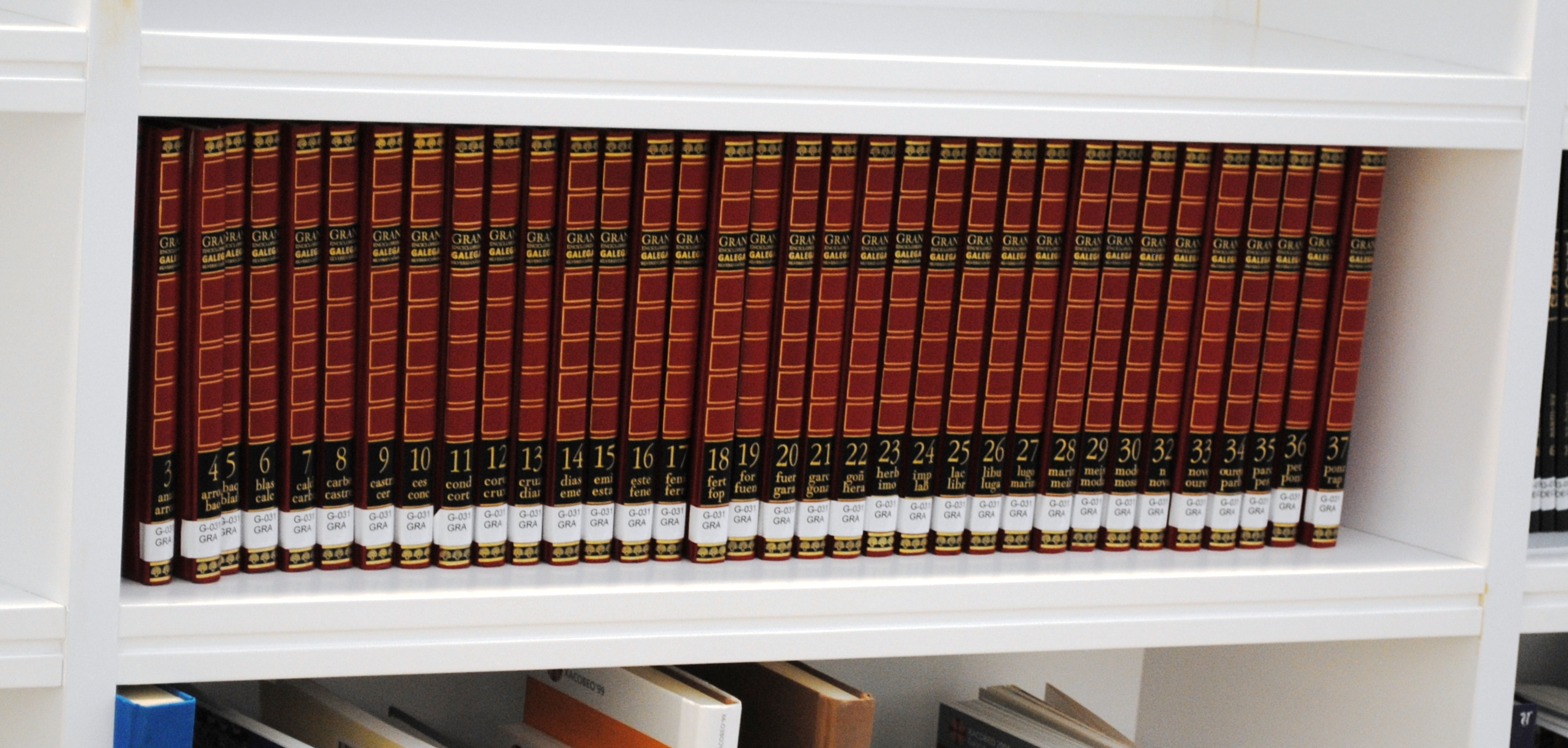
- Volumes of the Gran Enciclopedia Galega in the Library of Galicia.
- Original title: Gran Enciclopedia Galega Silverio Cañada
- Country: Spain
- Language: Spanish, Galician
- Publisher: Editorial Novos Vieiros, Grupo El Progreso
- Published: 1974 (first edition), 2003 (Galician edition)
- Media type: Print (hardcover), DVD

The Gran Enciclopedia Gallega Silverio Cañada, also known as Gran Enciclopedia Galega Silverio Cañada, or simply Gran Enciclopedia Gallega or Gran Enciclopedia Galega, is an encyclopedia focusing on the region of Galicia. It was first published in Spanish and later in Galician. A Galician-language version was also released on DVD.

== History ==
The first edition, consisting of 43 volumes in Spanish, was published in 1974. It was directed by Ramón Otero Pedrayo, with editorial coordination by Perfecto Conde Muruais, Arturo Reguera López, and Xosé Ramón Fandiño Veiga, with contributions from Xesús Alonso Montero.

Thirty years later, in 2003, a Galician-language edition was published by two publishing groups: Editorial Novos Vieiros from A Coruña (66 volumes) and Grupo El Progreso from Lugo (44 volumes).

The DVD version, in Galician, was released in 2005. It contains 100,000 entries, 25,000 photographs, 2,500 graphics, and 500 maps, including an individual map for each of the 315 municipalities of Galicia.

== Bibliography ==
- Cañada, Silverio; Cañada, Silverio (2003). Coru - Crux. Gran enciclopedia galega / Silverio Cañada. Lugo: El Progreso-Diario de Pontevedra. ISBN 978-84-87804-03-8.
