= The Encyclopaedia of World Literature =

1994–2016 Indian encyclopaedia of literature

- Original title: വിശ്വസാഹിത്യ വിജ്ഞാനകോശം
- Language: Malayalam
- Subject: World literature
- Genre: Reference encyclopedia
- Publisher: State Institute of Encyclopaedic Publications
- Publication date: 1994-2016
- Publication place: India

The Encyclopaedia of World Literature (Malayalam: വിശ്വസാഹിത്യ വിജ്ഞാനകോശം) is a 10-volume specialized encyclopaedia published by the State Institute of Encyclopaedic Publications in India. The work on the encyclopedia began in 1984 and the first volume came out 10 years later in 1994. The tenth and concluding volume was published in two parts in 2016.
