= Enciclopedia Universal Micronet =

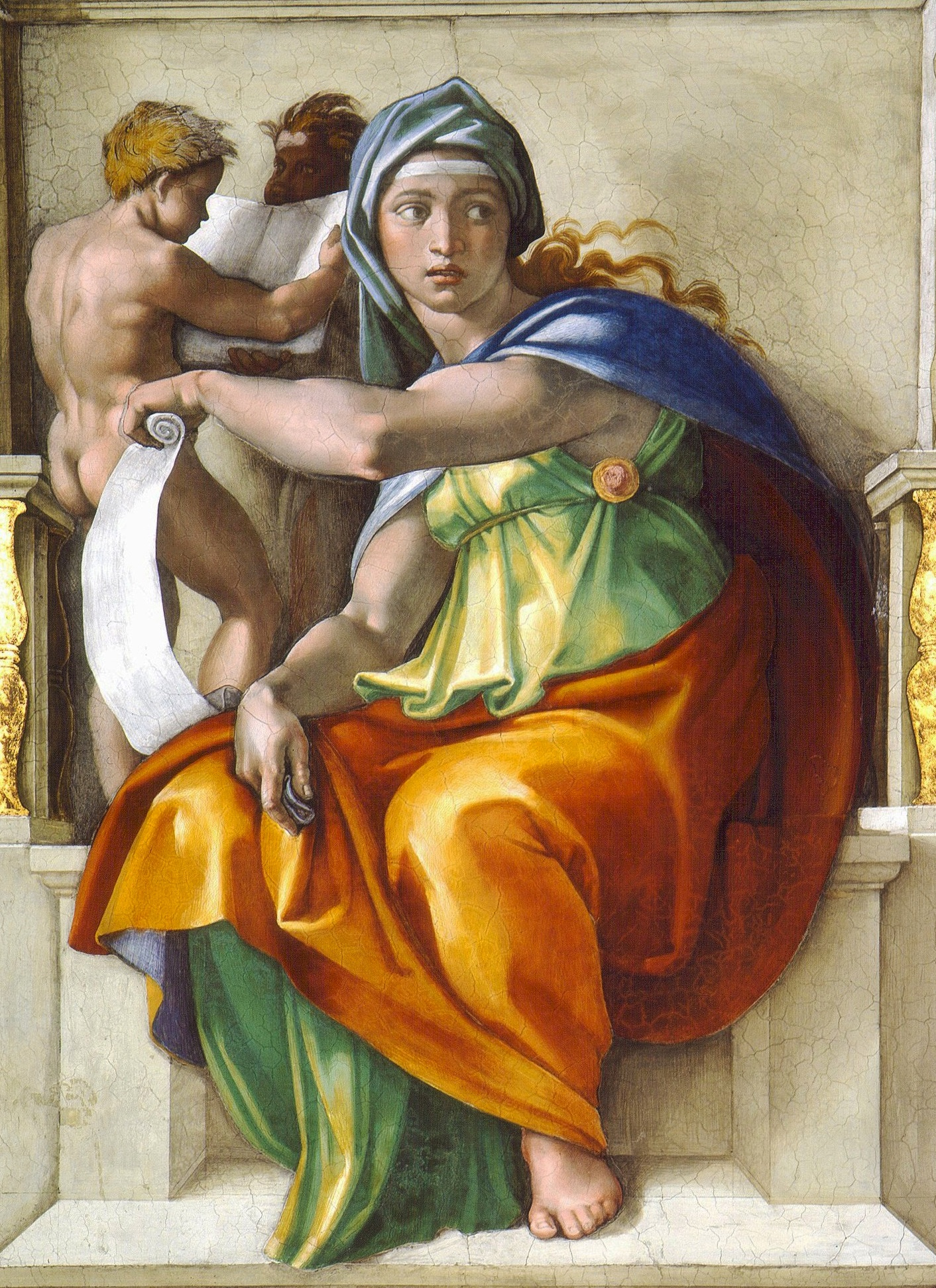
Enciclopedia Universal Micronet's image cover.

Enciclopedia Universal Micronet is a digital encyclopedia in Spanish language created in 1995. The 2010 version contains more than 185,000 articles.
