= Lists of encyclopedias =

For lists of encyclopedias, see:

- List of encyclopedias by branch of knowledge
- List of encyclopedias by date
- List of encyclopedias by language
- List of 18th-century encyclopedias
- List of 19th-century encyclopedias
- List of 20th-century general encyclopedias
- List of online encyclopedias
- List of online encyclopedias of U.S. states
- List of philosophical encyclopedias

== By language ==
- List of encyclopedias in Arabic
- List of encyclopedias in Chinese
- List of encyclopedias in Dutch
- List of encyclopedias in Finnish
- List of encyclopedias in French
- List of encyclopedias in German
- List of encyclopedias in Hungarian
- List of encyclopedias in Italian
- List of encyclopedias in Latin
- List of encyclopedias in Norwegian
- List of encyclopedias in Polish
- List of encyclopedias in Portuguese
- List of encyclopedias in Romanian
- List of encyclopedias in Russian
- List of encyclopedias in Spanish
- List of encyclopedias in Swedish
- List of encyclopedias in Ukrainian
- List of 20th-century general encyclopedias in English

== See also ==
- Bibliography of encyclopedias
- List of almanacs
- Lists of dictionaries
- List of digital library projects
- Cyclopedia (disambiguation)
