= List of 20th-century general encyclopedias =

== Arabic ==
- Global Arabic Encyclopedia (1996)
- Arab Encyclopedia (1998)

== Azeri ==
- Azerbaijani Soviet Encyclopedia (1976)

== Belarusian ==
- Byelorussian Soviet Encyclopedia (1969)

== Catalan ==
- Gran Enciclopèdia Catalana (1968)

== Croatian ==
- General Encyclopedia of the Yugoslav Lexicographical Institute (1977)
- Croatian Encyclopedia (1999)

== Czech ==
- Masarykův slovník naučný (7 volumes, 1925–1933)
- B. Kočího Malý slovník naučný (2 volumes, 1925–1929, online)
- Nový velký ilustrovaný Slovník naučný (22 volumes, 1929–1934, online)
- Komenského slovník naučný (10 volumes, 1937–1938)
- Příruční slovník naučný (PSN, 4 volumes, 1962–1967)
- Malý encyklopedický slovník A-Ž (1 volume, 1972)
- Ilustrovaný encyklopedický slovník (IES, 3 volumes, 1980–1982)
- Malá československá encklopedie (MČSE, 6 volumes, 1984–1987)
- Diderot (8 volumes, 1999–2000)
- Universum (10 volumes, 1999–2001)

== Danish ==
- Den Store Danske Encyklopædi (1994)

== Dutch ==
- Oosthoek (1907)
- Eerste Nederlandse Systematisch Ingerichte Encyclopaedie (1946)
- Grote Nederlandse Larousse Encyclopedie (1971)
- Grote Spectrum Encyclopedie (1974)

== Finnish ==
- Tietosanakirja (1909)
- Pieni tietosanakirja (1925)
- Uusi tietosanakirja (1960)
- Facta (1969)

== French ==
- Petit Larousse (1905)
- Nouvelle Encyclopédie autodidactique illustrée d'enseignement moderne (1922)
- Encyclopédie française (1935)
- Grand Larousse encyclopédique (1960)
- Encyclopedie universelle (1961)
- Encyclopedie Internationale Focus (1963)
- Quid (1963)
- Encyclopædia Universalis (1966)
- Grand Dictionnaire Encyclopédique Larousse (1982)

== Georgian ==
- Georgian Soviet Encyclopedia (1965)

== German ==
- Habbels Konversations-Lexikon (1912)
- Meyers Blitz-Lexikon (1924)
- Der Kleine Beckmann (1927)
- Jedermann's Lexikon (1929)

== Greek ==
- Great Greek Encyclopedia (1926)
- Helios (1945)

== Gujarati ==
- Bhagavadgomandal (1940)
- Gujarati Vishwakosh (1985)

== Hebrew ==
- Encyclopaedia Hebraica (1948)

== Icelandic ==
- Icelandic Encyclopedia A–Ö (1990)

== Italian ==
- Chirone : piccola enciclopedia metodica italiana (1914)
- Enciclopedia Italiana di Scienze, Lettere ed Arti (1929)
- Enciclopedia Disney (1970)

== Japanese ==
- Heibonsha World Encyclopedia (1988)

== Kazakh ==
- Kazakh Soviet Encyclopedia (1972)

== Korean ==
- Doosan Encyclopedia (1982)

== Kyrgyz ==
- Kyrgyz Soviet Encyclopedia (1976)

== Latvian ==
- Latvian Soviet Encyclopedia (1981)

== Marathi ==
- Maharashtriya Jnanakosha (1916)
- Marathi Vishwakosh (1976)

== Malayalam ==
- Sarvavijnanakosam (1972)

== Norwegian ==
- Norsk Allkunnebok (1948)
- Pax Leksikon (1978)
- Store norske leksikon (1978)

== Persian ==
- Moin Encyclopedic Dictionary (1946)
- The Persian Encyclopedia (1966)

== Polish ==
- Wielka Encyklopedia Powszechna PWN (1962)
- WIEM Encyklopedia (mid-1990s)

== Portuguese ==
- Grande Enciclopédia Portuguesa e Brasileira (1936)
- Enciclopédia Barsa (1964)

== Romanian ==
- Dicționar enciclopedic român (1962)

== Russian ==
- Great Soviet Encyclopedia (1926)

== Slovak ==
- Slovenský náučný slovník. (1932)
- Pyramída. (1971–1990)
- Malá slovenská encyklopédia. (1993)
- Encyclopaedia Beliana. (1999–)
- Všeobecný encyklopedický slovník. (2002)
- Univerzum – všeobecná obrazová encyklopédia A - Ž. (2011)

== Spanish ==
- Enciclopedia universal ilustrada europeo-americana (1908)
- El Nuevo Tesoro de la Juventud (1975)
- Great Aragonese Encyclopedia (1981)

== Swedish ==
- Svensk uppslagsbok (1929)
- Focus (1958)
- Bra böckers lexikon (1973)
- Nationalencyklopedin (1980)
- Barnens lexikon (1981)

== Tajik ==
- Tajik Soviet Encyclopedia (1978)

== Tamil ==
- Tamil Encyclopedia (1954)

== Turkish ==
- AnaBritannica (1986)

== Uzbek ==
- Uzbek Soviet Encyclopedia (1971)
