= List of 18th-century encyclopedias =

== In English ==
=== General ===
- The great historical, geographical, genealogical and poetical dictionary by Jeremy Collier (1701)
- An Universal, Historical, Geographical, Chronological and Poetical Dictionary (1703)
- Lexicon Technicum by John Harris (1704)
- Cyclopaedia, or an Universal Dictionary of Arts and Sciences by Ephraim Chambers (1728)
- General Dictionary, Historical and Critical by Thomas Birch (1734-41)
- Dictionarium polygraphicum by John Barrow (1735)
- An Universal History of Arts and Sciences by Dennis de Coetlogon (1745)
- A new universal history of arts and sciences. 1759.
- A new and complete dictionary of arts and sciences. 1763.
- Complete Dictionary of the Arts and Sciences by Thomas Henry Croker (1764–1766)
- The new complete dictionary of arts and sciences, or, An universal system of useful knowledge Vol. 2 (1778)
- New Royal Cyclopaedia and Encyclopaedia (1788). Edited by George Selby Howard and published in London in 1788, this was largely a plagiarization of Ephraim Chambers's Cyclopaedia.
- Encyclopædia Perthensis (1796–1806, ed 2 by 1816)

==== Britannica ====
- Encyclopædia Britannica First Edition (1768–1771)
- Encyclopædia Britannica Second Edition (1777–1784)
- Encyclopædia Britannica Third Edition (1797)
- Dobson's Encyclopædia (1789–1798; largely a reprint of the Britannica's 3rd edition)
- Moore's Dublin Edition (1788–1797; largely a reprint of the Britannica's 3rd edition)

=== Specialized ===
- The Complete Farmer: Or, a General Dictionary of Husbandry
- Medicinal Dictionary by Robert James (1743–1745),
- The universal dictionary of trade and commerce by Malachy Postlethwayt (an adaptation of Dictionnaire universel de commerce. by Jacques Savary des Brûlons (1751)
- Urania or, A compleat view of the heavens: containing the antient and modern astronomy, in form of a dictionary by John Hill (1754)
- Chemical Dictionary by William Nicholson (1795)
- A mathematical and philosophical dictionary by Charles Hutton (1795)

== In Chinese ==
- Complete Classics Collection of Ancient China (1725–26), Qing dynasty
- Complete Library of the Four Treasuries (1782), Qing dynasty

== In French ==
- Dictionnaire de Trévoux (1704–1771)
- La Science des personnes de cour, d'épée et de robe by Chevigny (1707)
- Nouveau dictionnaire historique et critique by Jacques-Georges Chauffepié (1750)
- Dictionaire historique by Prosper Marchand (1758)
- Encyclopédie, by Diderot and D'Alembert (1751–1772)
- Descriptions des Arts et Métiers (1761–1788)
- Encyclopédie ou dictionnaire universel raisonné des connaissances humaines, Yverdon, (1770–1780)
- Encyclopédie Méthodique by Charles-Joseph Panckoucke (1782–1832)

=== Specialized ===
- Dictionnaire philosophique, Voltaire

== In German ==
- Reales Staats- und Zeitungs-Lexicon by Philipp Balthasar Sinold von Schütz (1704)
- Curieuses Natur- Kunst- Gewerk- und Handlungs-Lexicon by Paul Jacob Marperger (1712)
- Allgemeines lexikon der Künste und Wißenschaften by Johann Theodor Jablonski (1721)
- Musicalisches Lexicon by Johann Gottfried Walther (1732)
- Allgemeines Gelehrten-Lexicon by Christian Gottlieb Jöcher (1733–1751)
- Grosses vollständiges Universal-Lexicon by Johann Heinrich Zedler (1751–1754)
- Oekonomische Encyklopädie by Johann Georg Krünitz (1773–1858)
- Deutschen Encyclopädie (1788)
- Historisch-biographisches Lexikon der Tonküstler by Ernst Ludwig Gerber (1790–1792)
- Conversations-Lexikon mit vorzüglicher Rücksicht auf die gegenwärtigen Zeiten (1796–1808; see Brockhaus)

== In Hebrew ==
- Ma'aseh Toviyyah (1707)

== In Italian ==
- Vincenzo Coronelli, Biblioteca Universale Sacro-Profana (1701–1707)
- Gianfrancesco Pivati, Nuovo dizionario scientifico e curioso, sacroprofano (1746–1751)
- Lorenzo Hervás y Panduro, Idea dell'Universo (1778–1792)

== In Japanese ==
- Wakan Sansai Zue (1712)

== In Polish ==
- Nowe Ateny (1745)
- Zbiór potrzebniejszych wiadomości (1781)

== See also ==
- List of 19th-century encyclopedias
- List of 20th-century general encyclopedias
- List of English-language 20th-century general encyclopedias
- History of the Encyclopædia Britannica
