= List of encyclopedias in Finnish =

This is a list of encyclopedias in Finnish.

The standard Finnish word for "encyclopedia" is tietosanakirja, literally a "knowledge word-book", or "knowledge dictionary". The adjectives iso and suuri may be somewhat interchangeably understood as "big", "great", or "large". Historically, the three main publishers of encyclopedias in Finnish have been Otava, WSOY (Werner Söderström Osakeyhtiö, in 2011 acquired by Bonnier Group), and Weilin+Göös (in 1995 acquired by WSOY).

Printed (paper)
Digital (online)
Both*

*This usually means that volumes of the encyclopaedia were originally printed on paper, but at some point (usually in the 1990s or early 2000s), the encyclopaedia has been digitised and made available in whole or in part in electronic form (usually online, but not necessarily). New entries may or may not be added, while old entries (originally printed) may or may not be updated. Usually, publication of paper-printed editions has been discontinued.

Title in Finnish	Meaning in English	Published
Facta & Facta 2001	Facta & Facta 2001	1969–2007 (print); 1994–2011 (CD-ROM/online)
Factum. Uusi tietosanakirja	Factum. New Encyclopaedia	2003–2005
Iso tietosanakirja	Big Encyclopaedia	1931–1958
Oma maa	(Our) Own Land	1905–1912; 1958–1959
Otavan iso Fokus	Otava's Big Focus	1971–1975
Otavan iso tietosanakirja: Encyclopaedia Fennica	Otava's Big Encyclopaedia: Encyclopaedia Fennica	1960–1965
Otavan Suuri Ensyklopedia	Otava's Great Encyclopaedia	1976–1983
Pieni tietosanakirja	The Small Encyclopaedia	1925–1928
Sanakirja yleiseen sivistykseen kuuluvia tietoja varten	Dictionary of Facts Belonging to a General Education	1883–1890 (Note: The first encyclopedia in Finnish, written by Agathon Meurman, mostly based on the German Meyers Konversations-Lexikon.)
Spectrum Tietokeskus	Spectrum Knowledge Centre	1976–1987
Suomen kirjailijat	Writers in Finland	1809–1916 (print vol. 1); 1917–1944 (print vol. 2); 1945–1980 (print vol. 3); 1993–? (online database) (Note: Series published by the Finnish Literature Society. An online database named "Suomen kirjailijat -tietokanta" [Writers in Finland -Database] was launched in the 1990s.)
Suomenkielinen Wikipedia	Finnish Wikipedia	2002–present
Suuri Suomalainen Tietosanakirja	Great Finnish Encyclopaedia	1988–1991
Tiedon Värikäs Maailma	The Colourful World of Knowledge	1972–1980
Tietosanakirja	Encyclopaedia	1909–1922
Uusi tietosanakirja	New Encyclopaedia	1929–1932
Uusi tietosanakirja	New Encyclopaedia	1960–1972
WSOY iso tietosanakirja	WSOY Big Encyclopaedia	1995–1997

== See also ==
- Encyclopaedia synoptica – a Latin encyclopedia from 1672 by Johannes Gezelius the Elder; the first encyclopedia published in Finland
- Northern Sami Wikipedia – written in Northern Sámi, a distant Uralic relative of Finnish
- Uppslagsverket Finland (1982–2007; online since 2009) – an encyclopedia about Finland written in Swedish
