= List of encyclopedias in Swedish =

This is a list of encyclopedias in the Swedish language. (Note: For the purposes of this list, the Swedish terms encyklopedin, lexikon, uppslagsverk(et) and uppslagsbok are all translated as "encyclop(a)edia".)

Printed (paper)
Digital (online)
Both*

*This usually means that volumes of the encyclopaedia were originally printed on paper, but at some point (usually in the 1990s or early 2000s), the encyclopaedia has been digitised and made available in whole or in part in electronic form (usually online, but not necessarily). New entries may or may not be added, while old entries (originally printed) may or may not be updated. Usually, publication of paper-printed editions has been discontinued.

Title in Swedish	Title in English	Volumes	Published
Barnens lexikon	Children's Encyclopaedia	6	1981, 2003
Bonniers familjelexikon	Bonnier's Family Encyclopaedia	20	1983–1986
Bra böckers lexikon	Good Books Encyclopaedia	100 (Note: 4 editions of 25 volumes each.)	1973–1995
Encyklopedi om livet (Note: Available online in 19 languages, one of which is Swedish.)	Encyclopedia of Life		2008–present
Focus (Note: Originally written in Swedish, later translated to Danish, Norwegian, French, Portuguese, and Spanish. It introduced a new era of smaller modular encyclopaedias, several later editions.)	Focus	5	1958–1960
Kulturhistorisk leksikon for nordisk middelalder	A cultural-historical encyclopaedia of the Nordic Middle Ages	22	1956–1978, 1980–1982
Kunskapens bok	The Book of Knowledge	53 (Note: 6 editions, 8 or 9 volumes each.)	1937–1959
Lexikon 2000	Encyclopaedia 2000	25	1995
MethodKit	MethodKit	42 (Note: As of February 2019, they have released 42 card decks that have been sold in 70 countries and translated into 14 languages.)	2012–present
Nationalencyklopedin	The National Encyclopaedia	20	1989–1996 (Note: Publication has stopped, but it is still available online.)
Nationalnyckeln till Sveriges flora och fauna	National Key to Sweden's Flora and Fauna	21 (Note: Publication is ongoing, with 21 volumes published as of 2019.)	2005–present
Nordisk familjebok	Nordic Family Book	99 (Note: 1876–1899: edition 1 of 20 volumes. 1904–1957: editions 2–4 of 38, 17, and 22 volumes. 1993: edition 5 with 2 volumes in hardcover and CD-ROM.)	1876–1899; 1904–1957; 1993
Nordisk familjeboks sportlexikon	Nordic Family Book Sport Encyclopaedia	7	1938–1949 (Note: Published in six volumes between 1938 and 1946, with a supplemental volume in 1949; Project Runeberg has been digitising it since 2017.)
Nordisk kvinnolitteraturhistoria (Note: Published in print in Swedish and Danish; and online in Swedish, Danish and English.)	The History of Nordic Women's Literature	5	1993–1998
Norrländsk uppslagsbok	Norrland Encyclopaedia	4	1993–1996
Susning.nu (Note: A Swedish online wiki started in 2001; anyone-can-edit encyclopedia until 2004; shut down in 2009.)	"Clue.now"		2001–2009
Svensk uppslagsbok	Swedish Encyclopaedia	63 (Note: 2 editions, 31 and 32 volumes.)	1929–1955
Svenska släktkalendern	Swedish Family Calendar	50	1911–present
Svenskspråkiga Wikipedia	Swedish Wikipedia		2001–present
Uppslagsverket Finland	Encyclopaedia Finland	8	1982–present (Note: 1982–1985: edition 1. 2003–2007: edition 2. 2009–present: freely available online.)
Svenskt kvinnobiografiskt lexikon (Note: Launched online in Swedish and English in 2018.)	Biographical Dictionary of Swedish Women		2018–present
