= Uusi tietosanakirja =

Uusi tietosanakirja may refer to:

- Uusi tietosanakirja (1929), Finnish encyclopedia
- Uusi tietosanakirja (1960), Finnish encyclopedia
