= List of encyclopedias in Romanian =

This is a list of encyclopedias in Romanian, including in "Moldovan" written in the Moldovan Cyrillic alphabet. (Note: As of 2025, there is a scholarly and political consensus, in both Romania and Moldova, that what was called "the Moldovan language", written in the Moldovan Cyrillic alphabet during the Moldavian Autonomous Soviet Socialist Republic (1924–1940) and the Moldavian Soviet Socialist Republic (1940–1991), was really just another name for the Romanian language. It was merely due to Soviet pressure that this language was written with Cyrillic characters, in an attempt to culturally differentiate Moldova from Romania. The Republic of Moldova resumed writing the language in Latin script in 1989, and declared "Romanian" its official language at independence in 1991. There had been some legal uncertainty due to the 1994 Constitution of Moldova calling the language "Moldovan", but that was amended to "Romanian" in 2023.)

- Dicționar enciclopedic român (1962–1966)
- Enciclopedia Cugetarea (1940, 1999)
- Enciclopedia română (1899–1904)
- Enciclopedia României (1938–1943)
- Lexiconul Tehnic Român (1948–1968)
- Romanian Wikipedia (2003–present)

Written in the Moldovan Cyrillic alphabet:

- Литература ши арта Молдовей Енчиклопедие Literatura si arta Moldovei Enciclopedie in 2 volume [Literature and Art of Moldavia. Encyclopaedia in 2 volumes] (in Romanian). Chișinău: Redacţia Principală a Enciclopediei Sovietice Moldoveneşti. 1985–1986.
- Moldavian Soviet Encyclopedia ("Enciclopedia sovietico-moldoveană"; Енчиклопедия Советикэ Молдовеняскэ): an eight-volume encyclopedia published by the Redacţia Principală a Enciclopediei Sovietice Moldoveneşti, in 1970-1981
- Popular Medical Encyclopedia ("Enciclopedia medicală curentă"; Енчиклопедия медикалэ курентэ): a one-volume encyclopedia published by the Redacţia Principală a Enciclopediei Sovietice Moldoveneşti, in 1984
- Moldovan Wikipedia 2004–2006; frozen until definitively deleted in 2017. Now :mo: redirects to Romanian Wikipedia.
