= Charles Edward de Coetlogon =

English divine

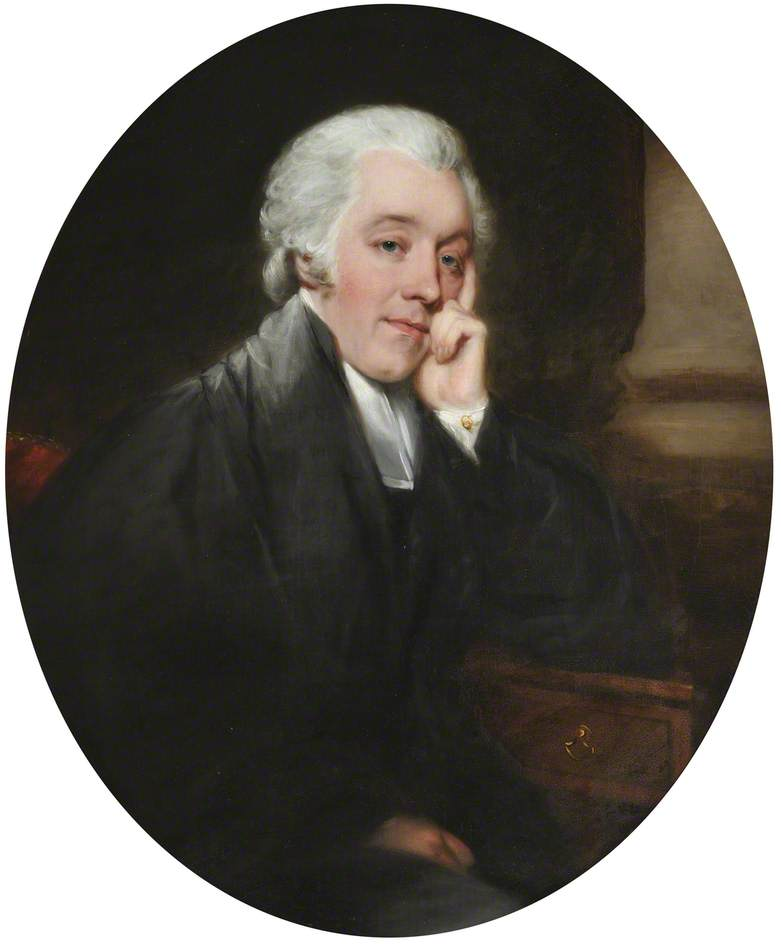
- Died: 16 September 1820
- Occupation: Divine

Charles Edward de Coetlogon (1746? – 16 September 1820) was an English divine.

== Biography ==
De Coetlogon was the son of the Chevalier Dennis de Coetlogon, M.D., a knight of St. Lazare, and author of 'An Universal Dictionary of Arts and Sciences,' published in 1745. Charles was admitted to Christ's Hospital in April 1755, and the following entry relating to him is contained in the register for that date: 'Charles Edward Coetlogon, son of Dennis Coetlogon, deceased. Baptised 13 March 1747, admitted from St. Leonard, Shoreditch. Richard Beckford, Esq.' Having obtained a university exhibition in 1766, he proceeded to Pembroke Hall, Cambridge, where he took the degree of B.A. in 1770, and that of M.A. in 1773. Soon after his ordination he was appointed assistant-chaplain to Martyn Madan at the Lock Hospital, where he quickly became known as a popular and eloquent preacher. In 1789 he was appointed by Mr. Alderman Pickett as his chaplain during his mayoralty, and in 1794 was instituted vicar of Godstone, Surrey. Towards the close of his life he became so infirm that he was unable to discharge his parochial duties. He died in Stamford Street, Blackfriars Road, on 16 September 1820, in the seventy-fifth year of his age, and was buried in Godstone churchyard on the 25th of the same month. Aided by a fine presence and great fluency of speech, De Coetlogon acquired a considerable reputation as a preacher of the Calvinistic school. He was the editor of 'The Theological Miscellany, and Review of Books on Religious Subjects,' from January 1784 to December 1789, and frequently wrote 'recommendatory prefaces' to editions of serious books. Besides a large number of separate sermons, he published the following works:

- 'The Portraiture of the Christian Penitent,' attempted in a course of sermons upon Psalm li. (2 vols. Lond. 1775, 8vo).
- 'A Seasonable Caution against the Abominations of the Church of Rome' (Lond. 1779, 8vo; second edition ditto).
- 'Ten Discourses delivered in the Mayoralty of 1790' (Lond. 1790, 8vo).
- 'Hints to the People of England for the year 1793' (Anon. Lond. 1792, 8vo).
- 'The Temple of Truth, or the Best System of Reason, Philosophy, Virtue, and Morals analytically arranged' (published under the pseudonym of Parresiastes, Lond. 1806, 8vo).
- 'The Miscellaneous Works of the Rev. C. E. De Coetlogon, Vicar of Godalming (sic), Surrey' (3 vols. London, 1807, 8vo). The first volume of these works contains the second edition of 'The Temple of Truth,' &c. (1807); the second, 'Studies Sacred and Philosophic: adapted to the Temple of Truth' (1808); and the third 'Additional Studies: perfective of the Temple of Truth' (1810). It may be added here that De Coetlogon was never vicar of Godalming.
- 'The King, or Faint Sketches for a true portrait of the Venerable Sovereign of the British Empire' (Lond. 1818, 8vo); second edition with additions, 1820.
- 'The Protestant Reformation of the Sixteenth Century, briefly celebrated as a motive to national gratitude,' &c. (Lond. 1818, 8vo).
