= Enciclopedia =

Enciclopedia (in Spanish and Italian), or enciclopédia (in Portuguese), means the English word encyclopedia.

Enciclopedia may refer to:

- Enciclopedia universal ilustrada europeo-americana (1908-)
- Enciclopedia Italiana or Treccani (1929-)
- Enciclopedia Libre Universal en Español (2002-)
- Grande Enciclopédia Portuguesa e Brasileira (1936-)
- Radio Enciclopedia, Cuban radio station
