= List of encyclopedias in Norwegian =

This is a list of encyclopedias in the Norwegian language (usually in Bokmål, sometimes in Nynorsk).

Printed (paper)
Digital (online)
Both (Note: This usually means that volumes of the encyclopaedia were originally printed on paper, but at some point (usually in the 1990s or early 2000s), the encyclopaedia has been digitised and made available in whole or in part in electronic form (usually online, but not necessarily). New entries may or may not be added, while old entries (originally printed) may or may not be updated. Usually, publication of paper-printed editions has been discontinued.)

Title in Norwegian	Title in English	Published
1001 filmer du må se før du dør	1001 films you must see before you die	
Adressebok for Oslo	Address book for Oslo	
Allkunne	All-knowing	
Arbeidernes Leksikon	The Labourer's Encyclopedia	
Arendal byleksikon	Arendal City Encyclopedia	
Arkitekturleksikon (1999)	Encyclopedia of Architecture	
Aschehougs konversasjonsleksikon	Aschehoug's Conversation Dictionary	
Asker og Bærum leksikon	Asker and Bærum Encyclopaedia	
Aviskatalogen	Newspaper Catalogue	
Bergen byleksikon	Bergen City Encyclopedia	
Biografisk leksikon til Norsk Salmebok og Norsk Koralbok	Biographical Encyclopedia of the Norwegian Hymnal and the Norwegian Choral Book	
Botanisk- og plantefysiologisk leksikon	Botanical and Pant Physiology Encyclopedia	
Caplex	Caplex	
Cappelens musikkleksikon	Cappelen's Music Encyclopedia	
Damms store medisinske leksikon	Damm's Great Medical Encyclopedia	
Den store film- og videoguiden	The Great Film and Video Guide	
Diplomatarium Norvegicum	Diplomatarium Norvegicum	1847–2011
Drammen byleksikon	Drammen City Encyclopedia	
Dødsfall i Norge	Deaths in Norway	
Etterretninger for sjøfarende	Mariner's Information	
Familieboken	The Family Book	
Felleskatalogen	The Common Catalogue (pharmaceutical)	
Film Max	Film Max	
FilmLex	FilmLex	
Flora Norvegica	Flora Norvegica	
Fredrikstad byleksikon	Fredrikstad City Encyclopedia	
Gyldendals konversasjonsleksikon	Gyldendal's Conversational Dictionary	
Hermes leksikon	Hermes Lexicon (Nynorsk)	1979–1980
Hjemmets store leksikon	The Great Home Encyclopedia	
Horticultura	Horticulture	
Hvem er hvem i norsk kulturliv?	Who's who in Norwegian cultural life?	
Hvem er Hvem?	Who is Who?	
Hvem Hva Hvor	Who What Where	
Illustreret norsk konversationsleksikon	Illustrated Norwegian Conversational Dictionary	
Kringla Heimsins (leksikon)	Norsk konversasjonsleksikon Kringla Heimsins	
Kristen sang og musikk	Christian Song and Music	
Kunnskapsforlagets Idrettsleksikon	Kunnskapsforlaget's Sports Encyclopedia	
Kunnskapsforlagets Store medisinske leksikon	Kunnskapsforlaget's Great Medical Encyclopedia	
Legevakthåndboken	The Emergency Room Handbook	
Litteraturvitenskapelig leksikon	Literary Encyclopedia	
Lokalhistoriewiki	Local History Wiki	
Matematikkleksikon	Mathematics Encyclopedia	
Media (leksikon)	Media (dictionary)	
MetLex	MetLex (Note: MetLex (Meteorological Lexicon) was a Norwegian professionally edited encyclopedia that was published by the Norwegian Meteorological Institute from 2009 to 2016. In 2016, its 706 articles were merged into the Great Norwegian Encyclopedia.)	2009–2016
Molde byleksikon	Molde City Encyclopedia	
Moss byleksikon	Moss City Encyclopedia	
NevroNEL	NeuroNEL	
Almanakk for Norge	Almanac for Norway	
Norges gamle Love	Old Law of Norway	
Norges leger	Norwegian Doctors	
Norges lover	Norwegian Laws	
Norges statskalender	Norwegian State Calendar	
Norsk Allkunnebok	Norwegian All-Knowledge Book	
Norsk biografisk leksikon	Norwegian Biographical Encyclopedia	
Norsk flora	Norwegian flora	
Norsk Forfatter-Lexikon 1814–1880	Norwegian Authors' Dictionary 1814–1880	
Norsk historisk leksikon	Norwegian Historical Encyclopedia	
Norsk idrettsleksikon	Norwegian Sports Encyclopedia	
Norsk kjendisleksikon	Norwegian Celebrity Encyclopedia	
Norsk krigsleksikon	Norwegian War Encyclopedia	
Norsk kunstnerleksikon	Norwegian Artists' Encyclopedia	
Norsk legemiddelhåndbok	Norwegian Medicines Handbook	
Norsk oversetterleksikon	Norwegian Translator's Dictionary	
Norsk pop- og rockleksikon	Norwegian Pop and Rock Encyclopedia	
Norsk salmeleksikon	Norwegian Hymnal Dictionary	
Norsk signaturleksikon	Norwegian Signature Dictionary	
Norsk stadnamnleksikon	Norwegian Place Name Dictionary	
Norske Gaardnavne	Norwegian Farm Names	
Oppdag Groruddalen!	Discover the Grorud Valley!	
Oslo byleksikon	Oslo City Encyclopedia	
PaxLeksikon	Pax Leksikon	
Refleks Leksikon	Reflex Encyclopedia	
Ringerike by- og bygdeleksikon	Ringerike City and Village Encyclopedia	
Sceneweb	Sceneweb	
Skattkista	Treasure Chest	
Sport i navn og tall	Sports in Name and Number	
Sportsboken	The Sports Book	
Store norske leksikon (SNL)	Great Norwegian Encyclopedia	1906–present
Topographisk-Statistisk Beskrivelse over Kongeriget Norge	Topographical-Statistical Description of the Kingdom of Norway	
Trondheim byleksikon	Trondheim City Encyclopedia	
Våre falne 1939–1945	Our fallen 1939–1945	
Wikipedia på bokmål og riksmål	Bokmål Wikipedia	2001–present
Wikipedia på nynorsk	Nynorsk Wikipedia	2004–present

- no:Musikkens verden
- nn:Norsk Ordbog (1873) Norwegian Dictionary : with Danish Explanation
- nn:Norsk Salmehistorie
- no:Fylkesleksikon for Sogn og Fjordane (Note: Formerly NRK Sogn og Fjordane Fylkesleksikon.)
- nn:Nynorsk leksikon
