= Finnish Wikipedia =

Finnish-language edition of Wikipedia

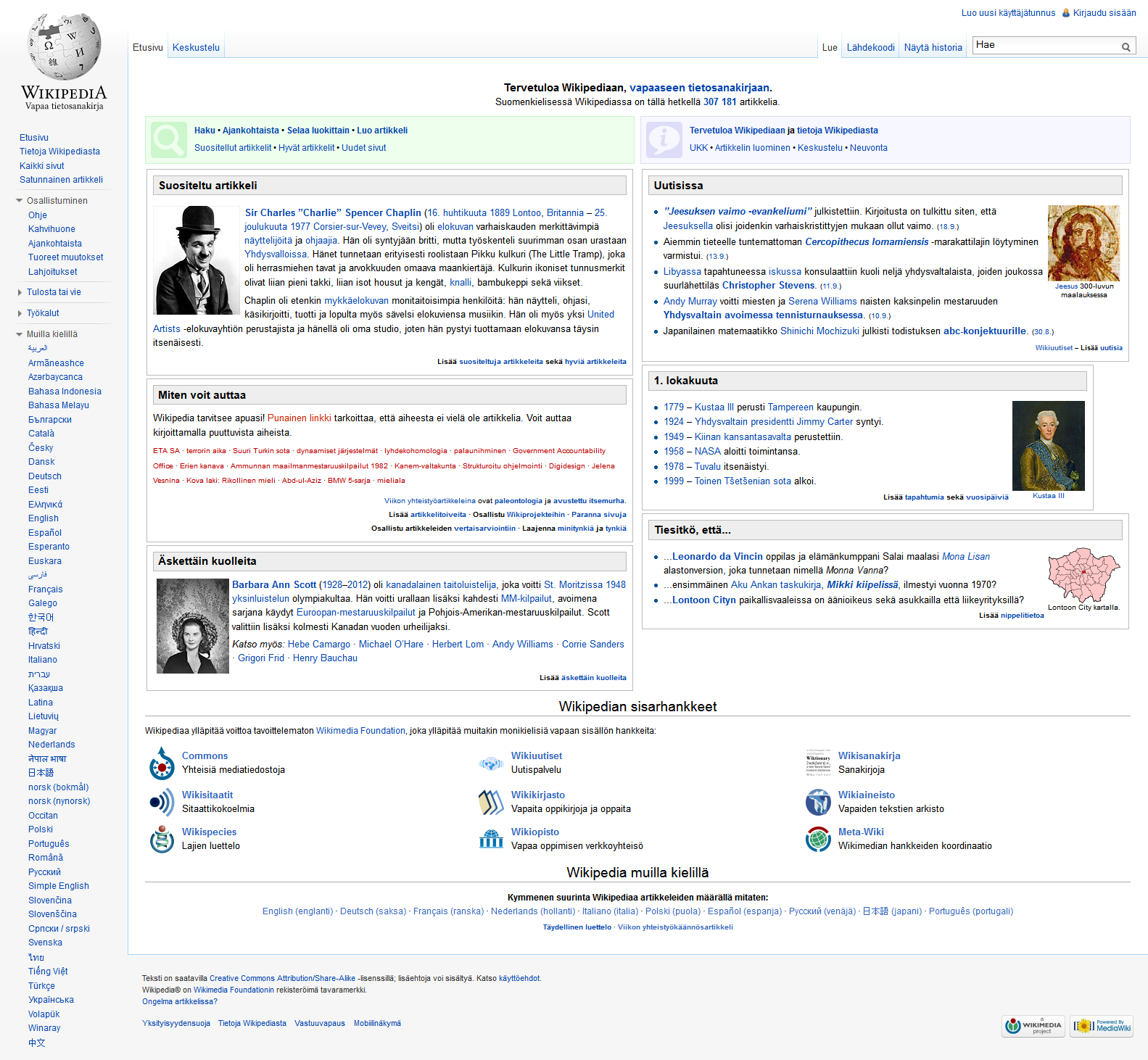
- Screenshot The main page of the Finnish Wikipedia
- Website type: Internet encyclopedia project
- Available in: Finnish
- Headquarters: Miami, Florida
- Owner: Wikimedia Foundation
- Website: fi.wikipedia.org
- Commercial: No
- Registration: Optional
- Launched: 9 September 2002; 24 years ago
- Content license: Creative Commons Attribution/ Share-Alike 4.0 (most text also dual-licensed under GFDL); Media licensing varies

The Finnish Wikipedia (Finnish: Suomenkielinen Wikipedia) is the edition of Wikipedia in the Finnish language. With 625,242 articles, it is currently the 29th-largest Wikipedia and the largest Wikipedia in a Uralic language. Wikipedia is the only encyclopedia in Finnish which is still updated.

The Finnish language project was started on 9 September 2002, but it remained at a very primitive stage until well into 2003. The speed of development picked up somewhat after the MediaWiki software was upgraded to Phase III in late November 2003, and continued to increase steadily through 2004.

In 2013, the reliability of the Finnish Wikipedia was investigated by the newspaper Helsingin Sanomat. The researchers used experts to evaluate quality of randomly selected 134 articles and found that 70% of the articles scored well for accuracy.

In 2026, Finnish Wikipedia contributors received the State Award for Public Information for "their long-term and communal work in building and maintaining open knowledge" on Finnish Wikipedia as well as on Swedish, Inari Sámi and Northern Sámi Wikipedias. The prize of €20,000 was presented to Wikimedia Suomi, a local Wikimedia chapter.

== Milestones ==
- 600,000 articles – 11 August 2025
- 550,000 articles – 2 April 2023
- 500,000 articles – 28 December 2020
- 450,000 articles – 12 January 2019
- 400,000 articles – 29 August 2016
- 350,000 articles – 9 July 2014
- 300,000 articles – 26 June 2012
- 250,000 articles – 24 September 2010
- 200,000 articles – 12 April 2009
- 150,000 articles – 4 February 2008
- 100,000 articles – 11 February 2007
- 50,000 articles – 21 February 2006
- 25,000 articles – 27 June 2005
- 15,000 articles – 9 February 2005
- 10,000 articles – 14 October 2004
- 5,000 articles – 15 April 2004
- 1,000 articles – September 2002

== Gallery ==
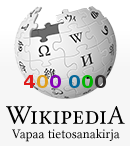
Finnish Wikipedia's 400,000 article logo (29 August 2016)

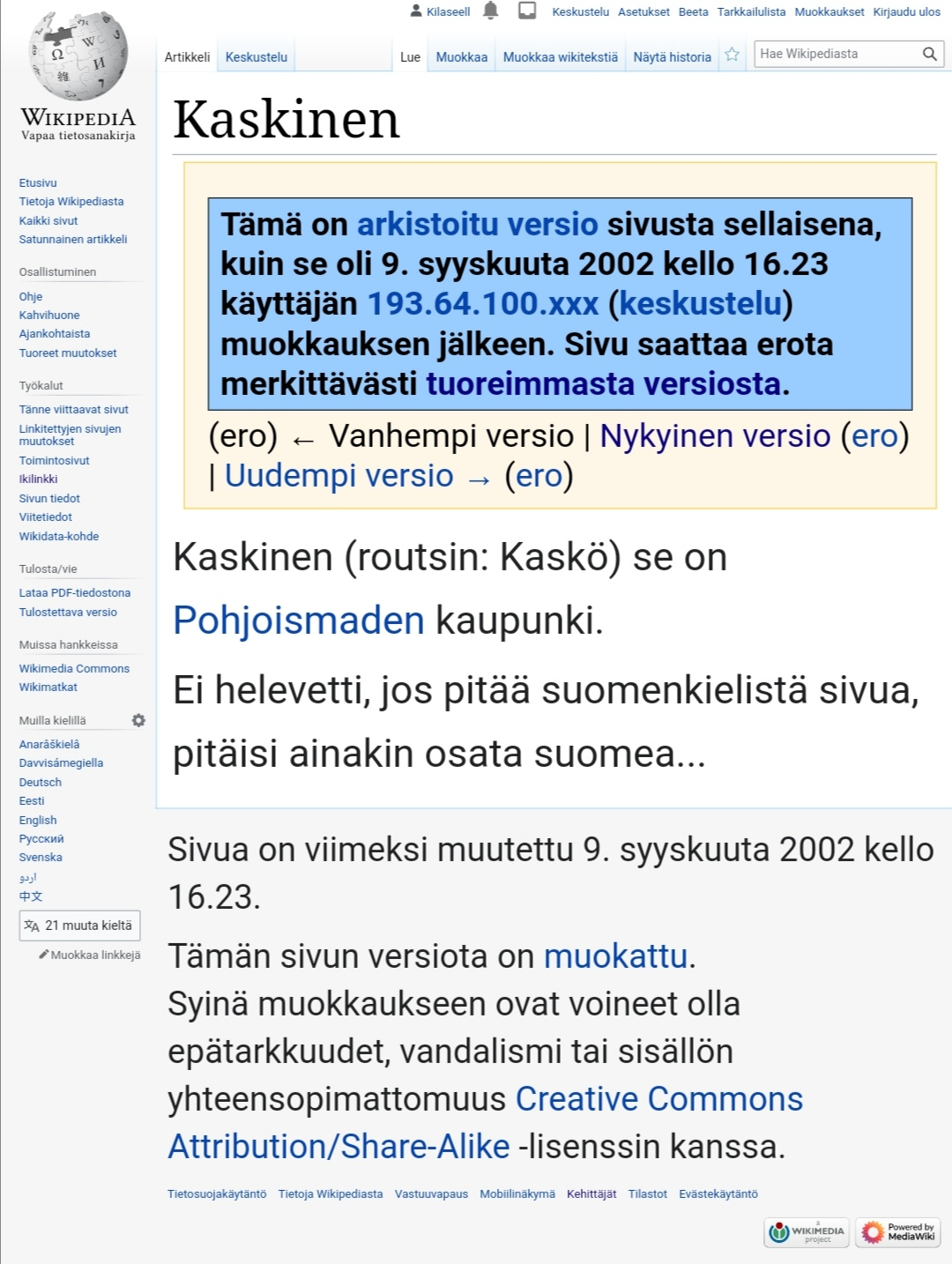
Oldest article that has survived. It's about the Finnish town Kaskinen.
