= List of encyclopedias in Portuguese =

This is a list of encyclopedias in Portuguese, in all varieties of the Portuguese language around the world.

Printed (paper)
Digital (online)
Both*

*This usually means that volumes of the encyclopaedia were originally printed on paper, but at some point (usually in the 1990s or early 2000s), the encyclopaedia has been digitised and made available in whole or in part in electronic form (usually online, but not necessarily). New entries may or may not be added, while old entries (originally printed) may or may not be updated. Usually, publication of paper-printed editions has been discontinued.

Title in Portuguese	Meaning in English	Published
Barsa	Barsa (portmanteau of founders' surnames Barrett + Almeida Sá)	1964–present
Diciopédia	Dictio-pedia (portmanteau of "dictionary" + "encyclopedia")	1997–2011 (Note: Published by Porto Editora (multimedia and online) from 1997 to 2009. Discontinued in 2011.)
Enciclopédia Verbo Luso-Brasileira de Cultura – Edição Século XXI	Verbo Luso-Brazilian Encyclopædia of Culture – 21st-Century Edition	1998–2009 (Note: Published by Editorial Verbo; 29 volumes.)
Enciclopédia da Vida	Encyclopedia of Life	2008–present (Note: Online since 2008 in 19 languages, including Brazilian Portuguese.)
Grande Enciclopédia Portuguesa e Brasileira	Grand Portuguese and Brazilian Encyclopædia	1936–1999 (Note: 40 volumes and later supplements.)
Infopédia	Infopedia	2003–present (Note: Published by Porto Editora (online); paid subscription to access dictionaries in 39 languages.)
Grande Enciclopédia Larousse Cultural	Grand Cultural Encyclopædia Larousse	1998
Enciclopédia Luso-Brasileira de Cultura	Luso-Brazilian Encyclopædia of Culture	1963–1995 (Note: Published by Editorial Verbo; 22 volumes.)
Lello Universal – Dicionário Enciclopédico Luso-Brasileiro	Lello Universal – Luso-Brazilian Encyclopædic Dictionary	c. 1950–2002
Conhecer	Knowing	1966–1981 (Note: Adapted from UK partwork Knowledge.)
Enciclopédia Mirador Internacional	International Mirador Encyclopædia	1976
Enciclopédia Infantil Verbo	Verbo Children's Encyclopædia	1976
Grande Enciclopédia Delta Larousse	Delta Larousse Grand Encyclopædia	1970 (Note: Adapted from the Grand Larousse encyclopédique.)
Focus – Enciclopédia Internacional	Focus – International Encyclopædia	1964
Enciclopédia Delta Larousse	Delta Larousse Encyclopædia	1960 (Note: Adapted from the Encyclopédie Larousse méthodique.)
Trópico – Enciclopédia Ilustrada em Cores	Trópico – Colour Illustrated Encyclopædia	1957
Enciclopédia Brasileira Globo	Globo Brazilian Encyclopædia	1943
Tesouro da Juventude	Youth's Thesaurus	1920 (Note: Adapted from The Children's Encyclopædia (1915).)
Wikipédia em português	Portuguese Wikipedia	2001–present

== See also ==
- Encyclopedias written in Galician:
  - Gran Enciclopedia Galega Silverio Cañada: on paper and DVD
  - Galician Wikipedia (Wikipedia en galego)
