= List of encyclopedias in Italian =

This is a list of encyclopedias in the Italian language.

Printed (paper)
Digital (online)
Both*

*This usually means that volumes of the encyclopaedia were originally printed on paper, but at some point (usually in the 1990s or early 2000s), the encyclopaedia has been digitised and made available in whole or in part in electronic form (usually online, but not necessarily). New entries may or may not be added, while old entries (originally printed) may or may not be updated. Usually, publication of paper-printed editions has been discontinued.

Title in Italian	Title in English	Published
Armi da guerra	War Machine	1983–1986
Enciclopedia biografica universale	Universal Biographical Dictionary	2006–2009
Chirone : piccola enciclopedia metodica italiana	Chiron : small Italian methodical encyclopaedia	1914
Enciclopedia Garzanti di astronomia e cosmologia	Garzanti Encyclopaedia of Astronomy and Cosmology (Note: Italian translation of Companion to the Cosmos (1996) by Mary and John Gribbin.)	1998
Grande enciclopedia aeronautica	Great Aeronautical Encyclopaedia	1936
L'aviazione	Aviation	1982
Biblioteca Universale Sacro-Profana	Sacred-Profane Universal Library	1701–1707
Capire	Understanding	1962–1964
Conoscere	Knowledge	1958–1963
Dell'Arcano del Mare	The Arcane of the Sea	1645–1646
Dizionario Biografico degli Italiani	Biographical Dictionary of the Italians	1960–2020
Dizionario enciclopedico degli scacchi	Encyclopaedic Dictionary of Chess	1971
Dizionario enciclopedico italiano	Italian Encyclopaedic Dictionary	1955–present
Dizionario enciclopedico Melzi	Melzi Encyclopaedic Dictionary	1881–1939
Dizionario enciclopedico universale (Note: A two-volume Corriere della Sera encyclopaedia.)	Universal Encyclopaedic Dictionary	1995
Dizionario Enciclopedico Universale della Musica e dei Musicisti	Universal Encyclopaedic Dictionary of Music and Musicians	1983–2005
Dizionario geografico fisico storico della Toscana	Geographical, Physical and Historical Dictionary of Tuscany	1833–1846
Dizionario storico della Svizzera (Note: Published in German, French, Italian, and an abridged edition in Romansh.)	Historical Dictionary of Switzerland	1998–present
Enciclopedia bresciana	Brescian Encyclopaedia	1972–2007
Enciclopedia costantiniana	Constantinian Encyclopaedia	2013
Enciclopedia Dantesca	Dante Encyclopaedia	1970–1975
Enciclopedia Disney	Disney Encyclopaedia	1970
Enciclopedia dei Papi	Encyclopaedia of Popes	2000, 2014
Enciclopedia dell'italiano	Encyclopaedia of Italian	2010–2012
Enciclopedia della scienza e della tecnica	Encyclopedia of Science and Technology	1963–1992
Enciclopedia dello Sport	Encyclopaedia of Sport	2008
Enciclopedia Einaudi	Einaudi Encyclopaedia	1977–1984 (Note: The Einaudi Encyclopedia has not been updated or made available online or on CD-ROM.)
Enciclopedia federiciana	Frederick's Encyclopedia	2005–2008
Enciclopedia filosofica	Philosophical Encyclopaedia	1957–2006
Idea dell'Universo	Idea of the Universe	1778–1792
Enciclopedia multimediale Mondadori	Mondadori Multimedia Encyclopaedia	1998–2004 (Note: The first edition of 1998 consisted of 12 books. The last edition was made available on CD-ROM in or around the year 2004.)
Nuova Enciclopedia Italiana	New Italian Encyclopaedia	1875–1888
Nuovo dizionario scientifico e curioso, sacroprofano (Note: By Gianfrancesco Pivati.)	New scientific and curious dictionary, sacroprofane	1746–1751
Enciclopedia oraziana	Horatian Encyclopaedia	1998
Enciclopedia Treccani (Note: Full title: Enciclopedia Italiana di scienze, lettere ed arti, "Italian Encyclopedia of Science, Letters and Arts". It is commonly known as the "Treccani", after Giovanni Treccani (1883–1961), founder of the Institute Giovanni Treccani for the publication of the Italian Encyclopaedia.)	Treccani Encyclopaedia	1929–present (Note: The first edition was published in the years 1929–1937 in 35 volumes and an index. Between 1938 and 2025, 11 appendices have been published, and publication is ongoing. "Treccani.it" was launched as the online version in 1996.)
Enciclopedia Universo	Universe Encyclopaedia	1962–1978
Enciclopedia virgiliana	Virgil Encyclopaedia	1984–1991
Fiori e vita di filosafi ed altri savi ed imperadori	Flowers and lives of philosophers and other scholars and emperors	c. 1270–1275
Le Garzantine	The Garzantines (Note: The Garzantines are a series of general and thematic encyclopaedias published by Garzanti.)	1962–present
Grande Dizionario Enciclopedico	Great Encyclopaedic Dictionary	1933–2015
HM: Il grande libro dell'heavy metal	HM: The Big Book of Heavy Metal	2011
Italia Judaica	Jewish Italy	2017
Omnia (encyclopedia)	Omnia	1997–2009 (Note: All published on CD-ROM.)
Orbis Pictus (Note: Originally published in Latin in 1658. Best known for its 1666 quadrilingual edition in Latin, German, Italian and French. Many other editions and translations were published.)	Orbis Pictus	1658–1780
Piccola Enciclopedia	Little Encyclopaedia	1853
I Quindici, I Libri del Come e del Perché (Note: I Quindici, I Libri del Come e del Perché ("The Fifteen, The Books of How and Why") was the Italian version of the 15-volume U.S. children's encyclopaedia Childcraft – the How and Why Library of 1934.)	The Fifteen, The Books of How and Why	1964–2006
Enciclopedia dello spettacolo	Encyclopedia of Performing Arts	1954–1966
Storia dell'arte italiana del '900	History of 20th-century Italian Art	1981–2010
Enciclopedia della televisione	Encyclopaedia of Television	1996–2008
Enciclopedia universale illustrata (Note: By Francesco Vallardi.)	Illustrated Universal Encyclopaedia	1887
Vita meravigliosa (Note: Published in Spanish under the title Lo sé todo ("I Know Everything").)	Marvellous Life	1962 (Note: Published 12 volumes by Mario Confalonieri in Milan in 1962.)
Wikipedia in italiano	Italian Wikipedia	2001–present
