= Grote Nederlandse Larousse Encyclopedie =

The Grote Nederlandse Larousse Encyclopedie (abbr. GNLE) is a Dutch-language encyclopaedia based on the French Grand Larousse encyclopédique, which appeared from 1971 to 1979 in 25 volumes. The project of publisher Heideland-Orbis (Hasselt) was larger in scope than its example, as well as the then existent Dutch encyclopaedias Winkler Prins and Oosthoek. Due to the cooperation with the publisher of the Larousse they could appeal to the extensive know-how of the French encyclopaedia and supplement it with the help from Dutch and Belgian experts.

The encyclopaedia contains 500,000 lemmas, 1066 categories grouped in 20 disciplines, 8000 literary quotations, 52,000 illustrations, 1200 geographical and thematic maps and 40 000 citations. A full medical encyclopaedia is included, as well as the Koenen-Endepols dictionary. A separate atlas is part of the series.

Only a single edition of the Grote Nederlandse Larousse appeared.

- Grote Nederlandse Larousse Encyclopedie. Samenstellers: L. Nagels en L. Vandeschoor. 25 dln. A-Z 1972–79. Atlas, 1979. 2 supplementen 1980, 1983. 's-Gravenhage: Scheltens en Giltay (vanaf dl. 17: Hasselt: Heideland-Orbis / 's-Gravenhage: Scheltens en Giltay).
