= List of encyclopedias in Russian =

This is a list of encyclopedias in the Russian language.

- Aluminium: The Thirteenth Element (Алюминий. Тринадцатый элемент.) (Note: Also in English, both published in 2007.)
- Brockhaus and Efron Encyclopedic Dictionary (Энциклопедический словарь Брокгауза и Ефрона, 1890–1906) (Note: Co-published by F. A. Brockhaus AG in Leipzig and Efron in Saint Petersburg.)
- Concise Literary Encyclopedia (Краткая литературная энциклопедия, 1962–1978)
- Encyclopedia of Domestic Animation (Энциклопедия отечественной мультипликации)
- Encyclopedic lexicon (Энциклопедический лексикон): not finished, letters А–Д (1834–1841)
- Geographical-statistical dictionary of Russian Empire (Географическо-статистический словарь Российской Империи) (1863–1885)
- Granat Encyclopedic Dictionary (Энциклопедический словарь Гранат, 1910–1948)
- Great Olympic Encyclopedia (Большая олимпийская энциклопедия, 2006)
- Great Russian Encyclopedia (Большая Российская энциклопедия, БРЭ)
- Great Soviet Encyclopedia (Большая Советская энциклопедия, БСЭ)
- The History of Cities and Villages of the Ukrainian SSR (Note: Also in Ukrainian.)
- Krugosvet (online since 2000)
- Kutepov's Hunting (Note: Formally titled The Grand Princely, Tsarist and Imperial Hunting in Rus' (Великокняжеская, царская и императорская охота на Руси).) (1896–1911)
- Kyiv: An Encyclopedic Handbook (Note: Original edition in Ukrainian published in 1981 as Київ: енциклопедичний довідник, Kyjiv: entsyklopedychnyj dovidnyk. Translated editions in Russian published in 1982, 1985–1986, and 1986 as Киев: энциклопедический справочник, Kiev: entsiklopedicheskij spravochnik.)
- Literary Encyclopedia (Литературная энциклопедия, 1929–1939)
- Moldavian Soviet Encyclopedia (Note: Also in the Romanian language (Romanian: Enciclopedia Sovietică Moldovenească), officially called the "Moldovan language" and written in Moldovan Cyrillic: Енчиклопедия Советикэ Молдовеняскэ. The Russian title is Молдавская советская энциклопедия.)
- Orthodox Encyclopedia (Православная энциклопеди, online since 2000) (Note: Under the general editorship of the Patriarch of Moscow and all Rus', the head of the Russian Orthodox Church.)
- RationalWiki (Note: Original in English; has 17 translated versions, including Russian.)
- Russian Wikipedia (Русская Википедия, online since 2001)
- Shorter Jewish Encyclopedia (Краткая еврейская энциклопедия, 1976–2005 in Jerusalem)
- Small Soviet Encyclopedia (1928–1932; 1933–1947; 1958–1960)
- Soviet Encyclopedic Dictionary (Советский Энциклопедический Словарь, СЭС 1979–1986)
- Soviet Historical Encyclopedia (Советская историческая энциклопедия, 1961–1976)
- Soviet Military Encyclopedia (Советская военная энциклопедия, 1976–1980)
