= An Universal, Historical, Geographical, Chronological and Poetical Dictionary =

An universal, historical, geographical, chronological and poetical dictionary, published in early 1703 was the first English-language reference work to present general information in an alphabetical format. However, the work was considered inferior in quality to another work, the Lexicon Technicum, which came out a few months later the same year and is considered the first "true" English language encyclopedia.

== Full title ==
Its full title was An universal, historical, geographical, chronological and poetical dictionary: exactly describing the situation, extent, customs, laws, Manners, Commodities, &c. of all Kingdoms, Common-Wealths, Provinces, Islands and Cities, in the known world. Containing Likewise The Lives of the Patriarchs, Prophets, Apostles, and Primitive Fathers; Emperors, Kings, Princes, Popes, Cardinals, Bishops, and other eminent Persons; with an Account of the Inventors and Improvers of Arts and Sciences, Philosophers, and all Celebrated Authors. Also The History of the Pagan Gods, very useful for the Understanding of Classick Authors; of the several Sects among the Jews, Christians, Heathens and Mahometans, with their principal Ceremonies, Games and Festivals; of General Councils and Synods, when, and where Assembled; of the Establishment and Progress of Religious and Military Orders; and of the Genealogies of the most Illustrious Families, especially our English, Scotch and Irish. The Whole consisting of a curious Miscellany of Sacred and Prophane History, Extracted from Moreri, Bayle, Baudrand, Hoffman, Danet, and many more of the best and choicest Historians, Geographers, Chronologers and Lexicographers, Antient and Modern. In two volumes.
