= List of encyclopedias in Latin =

This is a list of encyclopedias in Latin.

Printed (paper)
Digital (online)
Both*

*This usually means that volumes of the encyclopaedia were originally printed on paper, but at some point (usually in the 1990s or early 2000s), the encyclopaedia has been digitised and made available in whole or in part in electronic form (usually online, but not necessarily). New entries may or may not be added, while old entries (originally printed) may or may not be updated. Usually, publication of paper-printed editions has been discontinued.

| Title in Latin | Title in English | Published |
|---|---|---|
| De expetendis et fugiendis rebus | On Seeking and Avoiding Things | 1501 |
| De Medicina | On Medicines | c. 45 CE |
| De natura rerum (Cantimpré) | On the Nature of Things | c. 1237–1244 |
| De Nuptiis Philologiae et Mercurii | On the Marriage of Philology and Mercury | c. 420 CE |
| De proprietatibus rerum | On the Properties of Things | c. 1240 |
| De verborum significatione libri XX | Twenty Books on the Meaning of Words | c. 150 CE |
| Disciplinarum libri IX | Nine Books of Disciplines | c. 50 BCE |
| Encyclopaedia Cursus Philosophici | Encyclopaedia of the Philosophical Course | 1620–1630 |
| Encyclopaediæ, seu orbis disciplinarum, tam sacrarum quam prophanarum, epistemon | Encyclopaedia or Knowledge, Both Sacred and Profane, of the World of Disciplines | 1559 |
| Etymologiae | Etymologies | c. 625 CE |
| Fons memorabilium universi | Source of Notable Information about the Universe | c. 1430 |
| Legenda aurea | Golden Legend | 1265–present |
| Hortus deliciarum | The Garden of Delights | 1185–1899 |
| Lexicon Universale | Universal Encyclopaedia | 1677–1698 |
| Liber Floridus | Book of Flowers | 1120–1460 |
| Naturalis Historia (Plinius) | Natural History (Pliny) | 79 CE – present |
| Naturales quaestiones | Natural Questions | 64 CE – present |
| Nowe Ateny (Note: The book uses the Polish language as the main text, and primarily Latin for the in-line references.) | New Athens | 1745–present |
| Omne Bonum | Every Good Thing | c. 1375 |
| Orbis Pictus (Note: Originally published in Latin in 1658. Best known for its 1666 quadrilingual edition in Latin, German, Italian and French. Many other editions and translations were published.) | Orbis Pictus | 1658–1780 |
| Otia Imperialia | Recreation for an Emperor | c. 1211 |
| Speculum Maius | The Greater Mirror | c. 1250–1964 |
| Vicipaedia Latina | Latin Wikipedia | 2002–present |

== See also ==
- List of old Latin lexicons in Hungary
- Summa: an encyclopedic genre in Latin, usually on law, theology or philosophy
