= Arnulv Sudmann =

Arnulv Sudmann (19 June 1912 – 30 April 1981) was a Norwegian journalist, magazine editor, encyclopedist and associate professor. He was a proponent for the use of the Nynorsk language.

== Biography ==
Sudmann was born at Voss in Hordaland, Norway. He took artium in 1931, and later a magister degree in psychology at the University of Oslo in 1942.

He was a journalist at Norsk Tidend from 1935 to 1936 and edited the magazine Nynorsk Vekeblad from 1941 to 1943. He was the principal editor of the Nynorsk encyclopedia Norsk Allkunnebok. It was the largest Nynorsk encyclopedia ever published. The work was published in ten volumes between 1948 and 1964.

He was an associate professor at the high school Gudbrandsdal landsgymnas from 1960 to 1961, then secretary of Nynorsk in the Norwegian Language Board from 1961 to 1972 and office manager for Nynorsk at the same place from 1972 to 1980. Sudmann was appointed a research fellow in 1980, and thus belongs to the group of fellows who received government grants as they retire from public service.

He married Solveig Gjellesvik in 1946. He died at Oslo in 1981.
