= List of philosophical encyclopedias =

An encyclopedia of philosophy is a comprehensive reference work which seeks to make available to the reader a number of articles on the subject of philosophy. Many paper and online encyclopedias of philosophy have been written, with encyclopedias in general dating back to the 1st century AD with Pliny the Elder's Naturalis Historia.

== Encyclopédie ==
The Encyclopédie was a French encyclopedia edited by the philosopher and art critic Denis Diderot and the scientist, mathematician, and philosopher Jean le Rond d'Alembert. It was compiled by a group of intellectuals called the Encyclopédistes and includes, in addition to Diderot and d'Alembert, the famous philosophers Jean-Jacques Rousseau and François-Marie Arouet (better known by his pen name, Voltaire).

== Encyclopedia of Philosophy ==
The Encyclopedia of Philosophy is a major philosophy encyclopedia that was first published in 1967 by Macmillan in eight volumes and was edited by Paul Edwards. The second edition was published in 2006 in ten volumes and was edited by Donald M. Borchert, as The Editor in Chief.

== Routledge Encyclopedia of Philosophy ==
The Routledge Encyclopedia of Philosophy is edited by Edward Craig and was first published by Routledge in 1998. It contains more than 2,000 articles written by over 1,300 contributors.

== Stanford Encyclopedia of Philosophy ==
The Stanford Encyclopedia of Philosophy is an open access online encyclopedia maintained by Stanford University. The encyclopedia was started in 1995 by Edward N. Zalta. Contributors to the Encyclopedia give Stanford University the permission to publish the articles but retain the copyright to those articles.

== Internet Encyclopedia of Philosophy ==
The Internet Encyclopedia of Philosophy is an online encyclopedia that has the stated purpose of "providing detailed, scholarly information on key topics and philosophers in all areas of philosophy. The IEP is free of charge and available to all internet users world wide. The present staff of 25 editors and approximately 200 authors hold doctorate degrees and are professors at colleges and universities around the world, most notably from the United States, Great Britain, and Australia. The submission and review process of articles is the same as that with printed philosophy journals, books and reference works. The authors are specialists in the areas in which they write, and are frequently leading authorities.

== Other ==
- The Continuum Encyclopedia of British Philosophy is published by Continuum and devoted to philosophy in Great Britain.
