= Nationalnyckeln till Sveriges flora och fauna =

- Publication date: 2005
- ISBN: 978-91-88506-62-7

Nationalnyckeln till Sveriges flora och fauna (Swedish for "National Key to Sweden's Flora and Fauna") is a set of books, the first volume of which, Fjärilar: Dagfjärilar (Butterflies, 140 species), appeared on 25 April 2005. The publishing plan comprises 100,000 illustrations spread over more than 100 volumes, to appear over a period of 20 years, listing and providing popular scientific descriptions of all species of plants (flora) and animals (fauna) in Sweden. So large a work has never been published in the history of Swedish literature.

Nationalnyckeln is a popular scientific account produced on contract from the Riksdag by the Swedish Species Information Centre (ArtDatabanken) at the Swedish University of Agricultural Sciences (SLU) in Uppsala.
