= Norrländsk uppslagsbok =

Swedish scholarly encyclopedia on the land Norrland in northern Sweden

- ISBN: 9151842554

Norrländsk uppslagsbok (shortened NU) is a Swedish scholarly encyclopedia on the land Norrland in northern Sweden.

The encyclopedia was issued in the years 1993–1996, at first by the publishing house Bra Böcker (Good Books) according to its model, the Nationalencyklopedin, and with Kari Marklund as chief editor. Production of the encyclopedia was made in cooperation with Umeå University.

As of the second volume, the publishing was taken over by Norrlands Universitetsförlag and Lars-Erik Edlund became editor-in-chief. Foundation for the Promotion of Knowledge about Norrland (Swedish: Fonden för främjande av kunskap om Norrland) was responsible for the remaining volumes, a foundation made up by Umeå University, the former Högskolan i Luleå, former Mitthögskolan and former Högskolan i Gävle/Sandviken as well as Royal Skyttean Society, Folkuniversitetet and Kempestiftelserna.

== Volumes ==
- Volume 1: A - Gästg, chief editor: Kari Marklund, assistant editors: Lars-Erik Edlund, Tore Frängsmyr, 1993
- Volume 2: Gästr - Lanz, chief editor: Lars-Erik Edlund, assistant editor: Tore Frängsmyr, 1994
- Volume 3: Lapp - Reens, chief editor: Lars-Erik Edlund, assistant editor: Tore Frängsmyr, 1995
- Volume 4: Regio - Övre, chief editor: Lars-Erik Edlund, assistant editor: Tore Frängsmyr, 1996
