= Cyclopedia =

Cyclopedia, cyclopaedia and cyclopedien are archaic terms for an encyclopedia.

The term may specifically refer to:

- Cyclopædia, or an Universal Dictionary of Arts and Sciences, 1728, edited by Ephraim Chambers
- Rees's Cyclopædia, 1802–20, edited by Abraham Rees
- Penny Cyclopaedia, edited by George Long, published from 1833 to 1843
- Tomlinson's Cyclopaedia of Useful Arts, 1852–54, edited by Charles Tomlinson
- New American Cyclopaedia, 1857–63, editors George Ripley and Charles A. Dana
- The Cyclopedia of New Zealand, 1897–1908, edited by A. McKee and H. Gamble
- The English Cyclopaedia, 1866, edited by Charles Knight
- American Cyclopaedia, 1873–76, the successor to the New American Cyclopaedia, the primary editors were George Ripley and Charles A. Dana
- Cyclopedia of Universal History, 1880–84, World History
- Cyclopaedia of Political Science, Political Economy, and the Political History of the United States, 1881, edited by John Joseph Lalor
- Johnson's New Universal Cyclopaedia, 1876, edited by Frederick Barnard and Arnold Guyot
- Johnson's Universal Cyclopaedia, 1893, edited by Charles Kendall Adams
- Pears Cyclopaedia, a one volume encyclopaedia originally published in the United Kingdom by Pears Soap as Pears Shilling Cyclopaedia in December 1897
- Taber's Cyclopedic Medical Dictionary
- Universal Cyclopaedia, 1900, edited by Charles Kendall Adams
- Universal Cyclopaedia and Atlas, 1902, edited by Rossiter Johnson
- The Baseball Cyclopedia, 1922, by Ernest J. Lanigan

== Modern use ==
- The Dungeons & Dragons Rules Cyclopedia

== See also ==
- List of historical encyclopedias, for a number of less notable Cyclopediae
