= Childcraft =

Illustrated encyclopedia for children

File photo of Childcraft at a house in India

Childcraft, also known as Childcraft – The How and Why Library, is a multi-volume illustrated encyclopedia for children, which originated in 1934.

== History ==
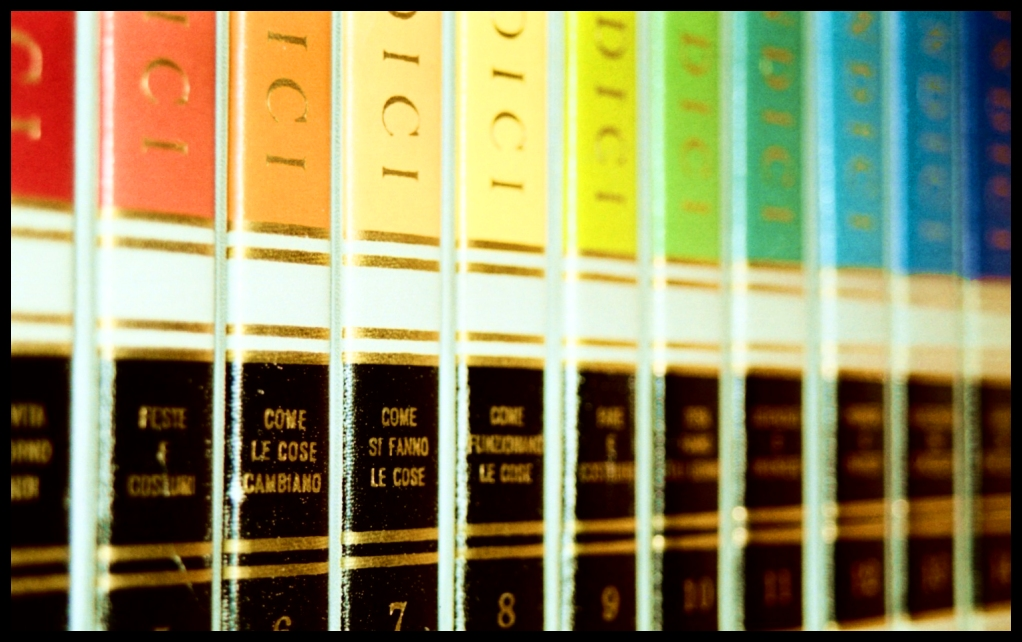
An edition of the Italian version I Quindici ("The Fifteen").

The Childcraft series was first published in 1934 by W. F. Quarrie & Company, then publishers of the World Book encyclopedia. The title was Childcraft – The How and Why Library.

Childcraft was created as an encyclopedia for young children with simple texts and illustrations designed to make learning fun. Each volume addressed different subjects, including literature — such as short stories and poetry, including fairy tales and nursery rhymes — as well as mathematics and the sciences.

Starting out as seven volumes in the late 1930s, the series was re-issued in a new edition every few years, sometimes incorporating new volumes and re-arranging existing ones. It grew to 15 volumes in the 1950s, and remained there, though further changes were made in later editions. An Italian translation, published by Field Educational Italia between 1964 and the late 1970s, was called I Quindici, I Libri del Come e del Perché ("The Fifteen, The Books of How and Why"); "Fifteen" referred to the 15 volumes comprising the English edition of Childcraft – The How and Why Library at the time.

The Childcraft set also added a separate, optional, special annual volume each year, starting in 1965. Some of these were later incorporated as regular volumes.

In addition, by the 1980s the series had broadened its reach to a dozen foreign language editions, with editions shipped to over 50 countries around the world.

== Contents ==
The 2025 edition consists of the following 10 unnumbered volumes:

- About You
- Art Around Us
- How Does It Happen?
- How Things Work
- Our Earth
- See the World
- Shapes and Numbers
- The Universe
- The World of Animals
- The World of Plants

The 2011–2013 edition consists of the following 12 unnumbered volumes:

- Art Around Us
- The World of Animals
- The World of Plants
- Our Earth
- Our Universe
- How Does It Happen?
- How Things Work
- Shapes and Numbers
- About You
- Who We Are
- See the World
- Celebrate!

The 2000-2007 edition consists of the following 15 volumes:

1. Poems and Rhymes—Poetry
2. Once Upon a Time—Short stories and folk tales
3. Art Around Us
4. The World of Animals
5. The World of Plants
6. Our Earth
7. Our Universe
8. How Does it Happen?
9. How Things Work
10. Shapes and Numbers
11. About You
12. Who We Are
13. See the World
14. Celebrate!
15. Guide and Index

The 1985–1996 edition consists of the following:

1. Once Upon a Time
2. Time to Read (1982–1990) or Stories and Poems (1991–1995)
3. Stories and Poems (1982–1990) or Time to Read (1991–1995)
4. World and Space
5. About Animals
6. The Green Kingdom
7. How Things Work (1982–1990) or Story of the Sea (1991≠1995)
8. About Us
9. Holidays and Birthdays
10. Places to Know
11. Make and Do
12. Look and Learn (1982–1990) or How Things Work (1991–1995)
13. Mathemagic
14. About Me
15. Guide for Parents (1982–1990) or Guide to Childcraft (1991–1995)

The 1973–1982 edition consists of the following:

1. Poems and Rhymes
2. Stories and Fables
3. Children Everywhere
4. World and Space
5. About Animals
6. How Things Work
7. How We Get Things
8. What People Do
9. Holidays and Customs
10. Places to Know
11. Make and Do
12. Look and Learn
13. Look Again
14. About Me
15. Guide for Parents

The last several volumes of the 1954 edition were aimed at parents-to-be and the parents of young children, rather than the children themselves. The full fifteen-volume set consisted of the following:

1. Poems of Early Childhood
2. Storytelling and Other Poems
3. Folk and Fairy Tales
4. Animal Friends and Adventures
5. Life in Many Lands
6. Great Men and Famous Deeds
7. Exploring the World Around Us
8. Creative Play and Hobbies
9. Science and Industry
10. Art for Children
11. Music for the Family
12. You and Your Family
13. Your Young Child
14. Your Child Goes to School
15. Your Child in Today's World

The following "Childcraft Annual" volumes were released.

- 1965. Places to Know
- 1966. Look and Learn
- 1967. Braving the Elements
- 1968. Look Again
- 1969. About Me
- 1970. Children Everywhere
- 1971. About Animals
- 1972. The Green Kingdom
- 1973. About Us
- 1974. Animals in Danger
- 1975. The Magic of Words
- 1976. Prehistoric Animals
- 1977. About Dogs
- 1978. Mathemagic
- 1979. Story of the Sea
- 1980. The Indian Book
- 1981. The Bug Book
- 1982. The Puzzle Book
- 1983. Feathered Friends
- 1984. Great Myths and Legends
- 1985. Conquest of the Sky
- 1986. Mysteries and Fantasies
- 1987. Dinosaurs
- 1988. Stories of Freedom
- 1989. World of Color/People to Know
- 1990. A Place to Live/How We Get Things
- 1991. I Was Wondering
- 1992. Pets and Other Animals
- 1993. Inventors and Inventions
- 1994. A Look Into Space
- 1995. Our Amazing Bodies
- 1996. Exploring the Ocean
- 1997. Science, Science Everywhere
- 1998. Friends in the Wild
- 1999. The Fact Factory
- 2000. World Adventure
- 2001. Stories to Share
- 2002. Secrets of the Past
- 2003. Heroes and Helpers
- 2004. Native North Americans
- 2005. All About Birds
- 2006. Tales of Mystery and the Unknown
- 2007. Insects, Spiders, and Creepy Crawlers
- 2008. Dogs, from Woofs to Wags
- 2009. Tales Through Time
- 2010. Brain Games
- 2011. Code Red: Animals in Peril
- 2012. Letters to Words
- 2013. A Dream Takes Flight
- 2014. The Secret Files of Professor L. Otto Funn
- 2015. Dr. Mollie Cule Reboots the Robot
- 2016. Dinosaurs Great & Small
- 2017. MFF (Math Friends Forever)
- 2018. Monster All Around
- 2019. Where in the World Can I...
- 2020. Animals at Work
- 2021. Taste the World!
- 2022. Out of This World
