= Complete Dictionary of Arts and Sciences =

The Complete Dictionary of Arts and Sciences was an encyclopedia edited by Temple Henry Croker. It is notable for being published in Coventry – the first English encyclopedia published outside London.

Publication began in April 1765 with the issuance of the first of what were eventually 150 three-page sheets that were eventually collected into a folio dated 1764–1766.

Other contributors included Thomas Williams, MD, who provided articles on medicine, anatomy and chemistry, and Samuel Clark who provided articles on mathematics. Nevertheless, the work was largely a plagiarization of Ephraim Chambers' Cyclopaedia, or a Universal Dictionary of Arts and Sciences.
