= Grote Spectrum Encyclopedie =

Dutch encyclopedia

The Grote Spectrum Encyclopedie ("Great Spectrum Encyclopedia") (published by Het Spectrum, Utrecht between 1974 and 1980) is a Dutch encyclopedia which treats subjects in 5000 large and comprehensive articles (like the Encyclopædia Britannica) with a clear accent on the social sciences.

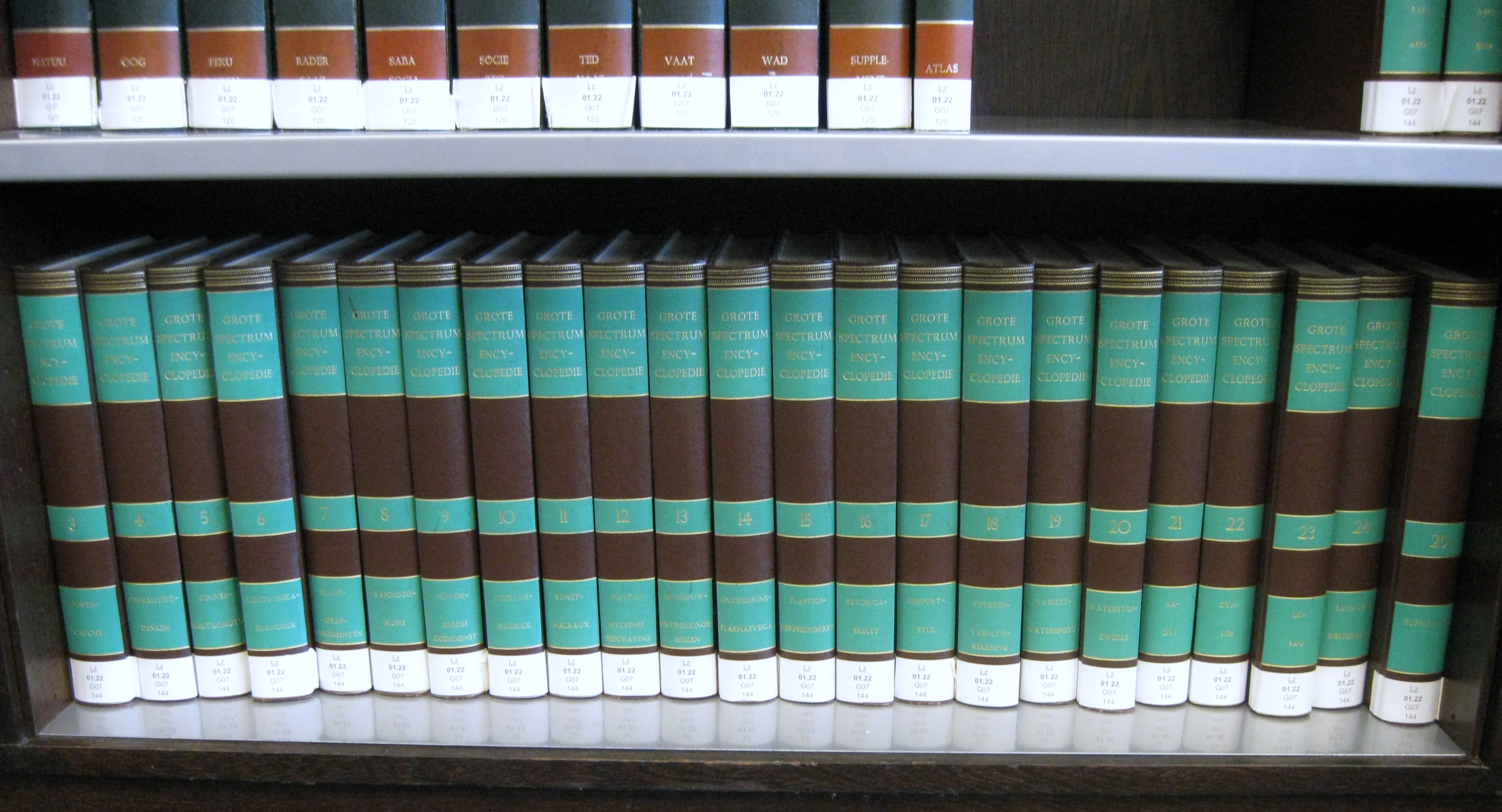
Encyclopedia of Spectrum

== Description ==
Encyclopedia contains about 5000 large detailed articles on various topics with an emphasis on social sciences. All illustrations and design are colored, which is new for this kind of encyclopedias, published in the Netherlands. The editor-in-chief of the encyclopaedia in 1972-1974 was Inez van Eyck, who in 1971-1972 also was preparing articles for the publication. The circulation of the encyclopedia, as a rule, was sold with the delivery of volumes to the house. The total cost was 2500 guilders . As a rule, the possibility of buying on credit was used, the payment of which amounted to 60 guilders per month for a full five years. The rise of new storage media in the 1990s (CD-ROM, DVD) halted the plans for a second edition of the Grote Spectrum Encyclopedie. An actualised supplement did appear in 2002.

== Composition ==
The encyclopedia is functionally illustrated and consists of 20 volumes A-Z, and four index volumes with references to lemmas within the treated subjects. The fourth index volume also contains a comprehensive bibliography (which is not included in the articles themselves). A supplement (volume 25) appeared in 1984.

| Vol | Title | Note |
|---|---|---|
| 1 | Aal-Arg | |
| 2 | Arg-Bew | |
| 3 | Bew-Cau | |
| 4 | Cau-Den | |
| 5 | Den-Ele | |
| 6 | Ele-Fra | |
| 7 | Fra-Gra | |
| 8 | Gra-Hum | |
| 9 | Hum-Joo | |
| 10 | Jor-Kub | |
| 11 | Kun-Mal | |
| 12 | Mal-Myc | |
| 13 | Mijn-Ont | |
| 14 | Ont-Pla | |
| 15 | Pla-Res | |
| 16 | Ret-Ske | |
| 17 | Ski-De Sti | |
| 18 | Sty-Var | |
| 19 | Var-Wat | |
| 20 | Wat-Zwo | |
| 21 | Aa-Dyj | Scribble volume |
| 22 | Dyk-Leh | Scribble volume |
| 23 | Lei-Sau | Scribble volume |
| 24 | Sau-Zzw, bibliography | Scribble volume |
| 25 | Supplements | Additional volumes |
