= Porto Editora =

Portuguese publisher

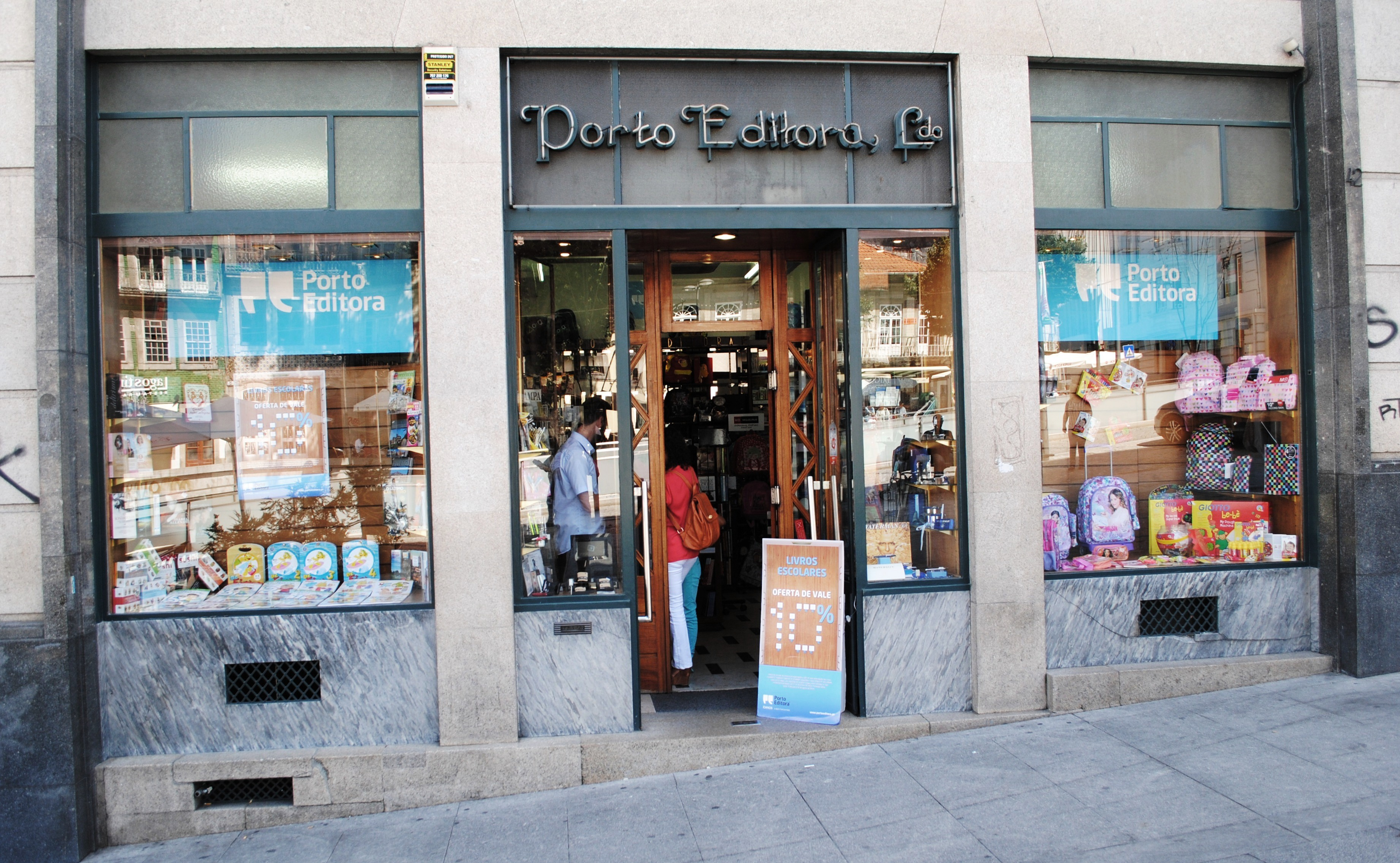
Praça D. Filipa de Lencastre.

Porto Editora is the largest Portuguese publisher with a consolidated turnover of more than 90M € in 2010. It is the leading educational publisher in Portugal in the areas of educational books, dictionaries and multimedia products, both off-line and on-line. Porto Editora was founded in 1944 in Porto by a group of teachers within different areas of education.
