= Romanian Wikipedia =

Romanian-language edition of Wikipedia

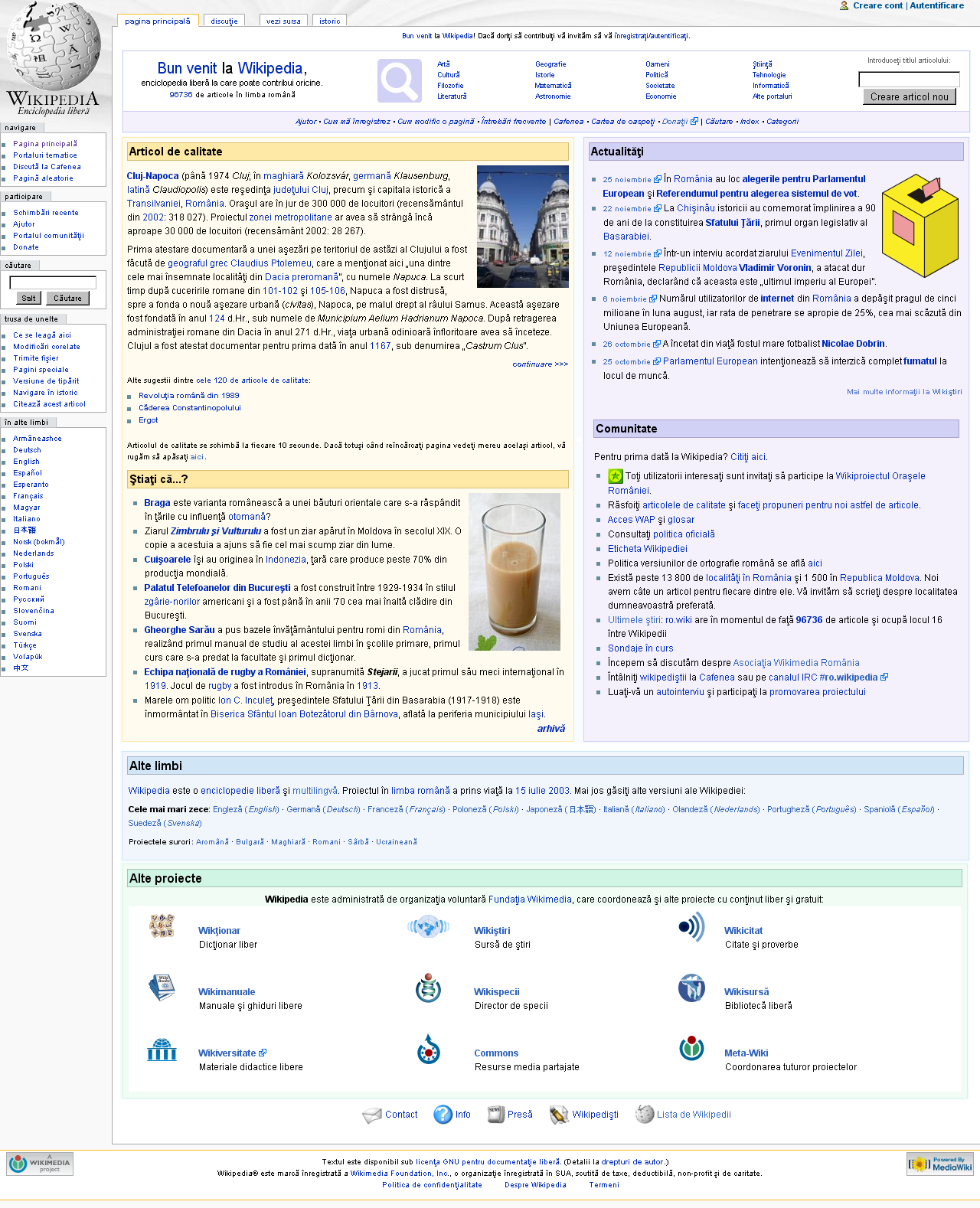
- Main Page of the Romanian Wikipedia in November 2007
- Website type: Internet encyclopedia project
- Available in: Romanian
- Owner: Wikimedia Foundation
- Website: ro.wikipedia.org
- Commercial: No
- Registration: Optional
- Launched: 10 July 2003; 23 years ago
- Content license: Creative Commons Attribution/ Share-Alike 4.0 (most text also dual-licensed under GFDL); Media licensing varies

The Romanian Wikipedia (abr. ro.wiki or ro.wp; Romanian: Wikipedia în limba română) is the Romanian language edition of Wikipedia, the free encyclopedia. Started on 12 July 2003, as of 22 September 2026 this edition has 549,066 articles and is the 32nd largest Wikipedia edition. In December 2004, users on the Romanian Wikipedia started to talk about founding a local chapter of Wikimedia, Asociația Wikimedia România.

== History ==
The first articles in the Romanian Wikipedia were written in July 2003, with the first version of the main page being drafted on 12 July. The user interface, initially in English, started being translated into Romanian by Bogdan Stăncescu (registered with the username Gutza) as soon as he was given sysop rights. The same user subsequently contacted several Romanian universities that were available on the internet, as well as the Romanian Academy, in order to attract new contributors. His efforts were soon remarked by the Romanian media, who invited him on several occasions to introduce the project to the public. By the end of 2003, the Romanian Wikipedia had exceeded 3,000 articles, ranking 16th among all Wikipedias. The 10,000th article was written on 13 December 2004, and the 50,000th on 5 January 2007.

In April 2004, the Romanian Wikipedia supported the launch of the Aromanian Wikipedia (see Aromanian language).

In June 2004, the Romanian Wikipedia encountered problems concerning its division and the creation of a separate Moldovan Wikipedia (see Moldovan language). A Moldovan-language version of Wikipedia was brought into existence because it was created automatically together with a larger number of other Wikipedias, as the language had been assigned separate ISO 639 codes (mo/mol—which were deprecated in November 2008 by the ISO authorities). At its beginnings, it worked as a portal redirecting to the Romanian Wikipedia, but in March 2005, it eventually began allowing content (although only intended for Cyrillic Moldovan/Romanian as it was used before 1989 in the Moldavian SSR and remains in use only in the breakaway state of Transnistria), starting big editing wars and endless discussion. Between December 2006 up to its deletion in November 2017, it was frozen and editing was no longer permitted. This question was raised from time to time, although users on Wikipedia voted on its closure and its deletion.

The Romanian Wikipedia reached the 100,000 article milestone on 11 January 2008. As of September 2025, it has 516,000 articles and 1,967 active users, of whom 18 are administrators.

== Peculiarities ==
The logo of the Romanian Wikipedia was at first slightly different from the logos of other Wikipedias. The Cyrillic letter И in the logo was replaced with the Romanian letter Ă. It was later restored to the generic Wikipedia logo.

Articles can contain small spelling variations, mostly regarding the use of the letters â and î, both used for the close central unrounded vowel /ɨ/ (cf. Romanian alphabet). According to the 1993 spelling rules promoted by the Romanian Academy, /ɨ/ is transcribed as either î, when used as the first or last letter of words, or â, when it occurs in the middle of the word (with some exceptions). Still, between 1953 and 1993, the Romanian language only used î - after 1964 an exception was made for derivations of the words România ("Romania"), român ("Romanian") and related words. The Academy rules are mandatory in government organisations and in state schools in Romania. Moldova adopted the Latin alphabet for the Romanian language before the spelling reform in 1993, and it didn't switch to the new spelling up until 2001, using the letter î before exclusively (exceptions were made for România and the other related words, spelled with â). Other spelling differences include sunt/sînt or niciun/nici un. The Romanian Wikipedia community adopted a language policy stating that both pre-1993 and post-1993 spelling norms are permitted, and editing an article just to switch it from one norm to the other is not acceptable; switching is allowed if the article is significantly expanded or rewritten.

Concerning the addressing policy, Romanian Wikipedia uses the polite forms of the personal pronouns and verbs. A policy on this was discussed in early 2006, and consensus was reached for the use of dumneavoastră (polite "you") instead of tu (familiar "you") on its pages.

== Timeline ==
Annual number of articles as of December (each year) since the creation of edition.

View source data.

Number of total articles at a specific time

- October 2003: 250 articles
- 20 December 2003: 2,500 articles
- 7 April 2004: 5,000 articles
- 12 December 2004: 10,000 articles
- 5 January 2007: 50,000 articles
- 11 January 2008: 100,000 articles
- 21 May 2009: 125,000 articles
- 13 September 2010: 150,000 articles
- 5 August 2012: 200,000 articles
- 25 July 2014: 250,000 articles
- 13 April 2015: 300,000 articles
- 2 September 2015: 350,000 articles
- 15 August 2019: 400,000 articles
- 28 October 2024: 500,000 articles
