= Dennis de Coetlogon =

French physician and encyclopedist

Dennis de Coetlogon (ca 1700 – 23 October 1749) was a French medical doctor who moved to England around 1727. He is best known as the author of An Universal History of Arts and Sciences, the name for encyclopedias in Great Britain. Its plan was followed by Encyclopædia Britannica, keeping important subjects together, but on the other facilitating reference by numerous and short separate articles arranged in alphabetical order. Coetlogon's work "endeavours to render each treatise as complete as possible, avoiding above all things needless repetitions, and never puzzling the reader with the least reference".

Born in France, he was naturalised as a citizen of England. He was a knight of St. Lazare. His son was theologian and author, Rev. Charles Edward de Coetlogon.
