= Slovenský náučný slovník =

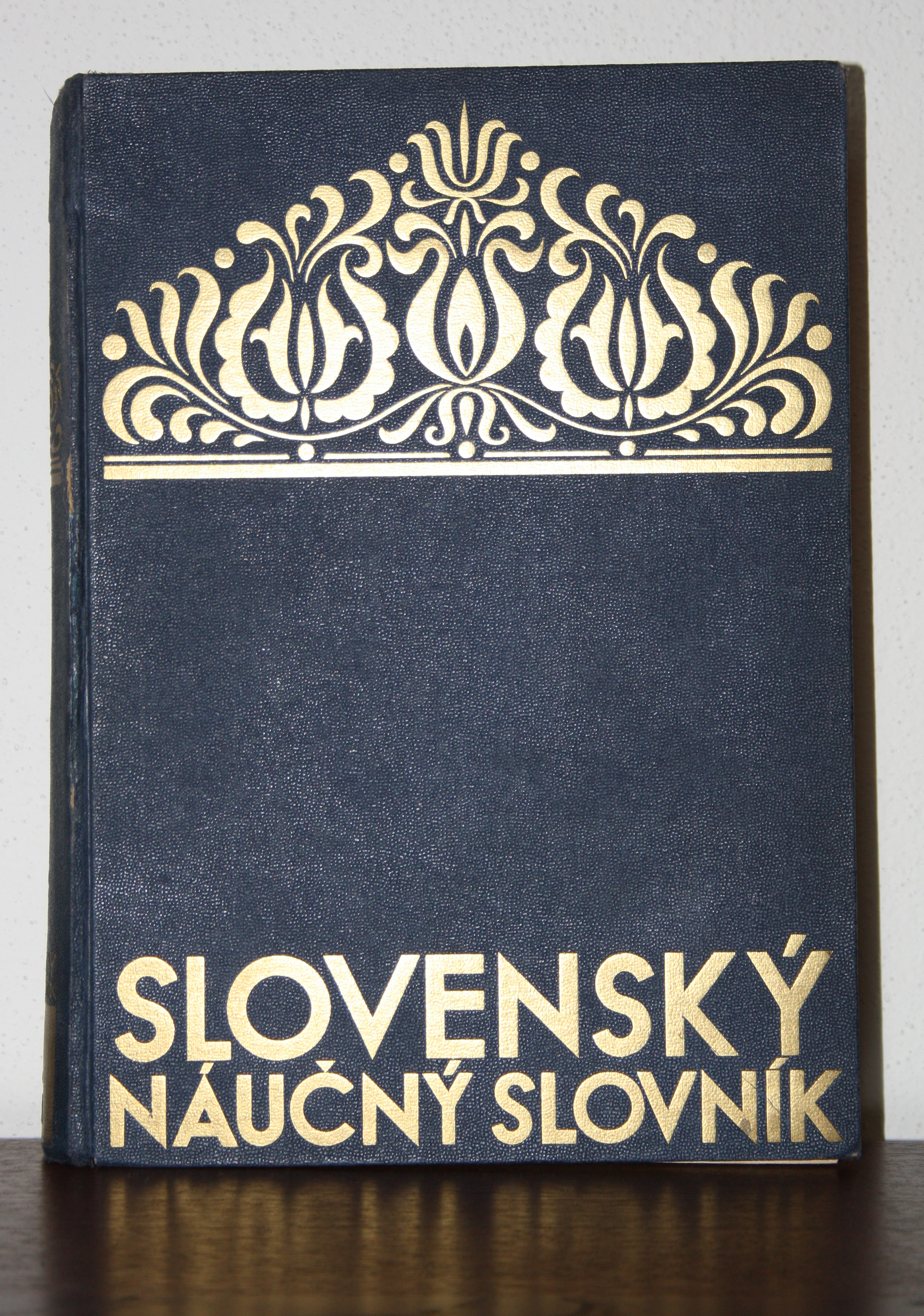
- The cover of Slovenský náučný slovník
- Author: Pavel Bujnák (ed.) et al.
- Language: Slovak
- Subject: General
- Genre: Reference encyclopaedia
- Published: 1932, LITEVNA, literárne a vedecké nakladateľstvo Vojtech Tilkovský
- Publication place: Slovakia
- Media type: 3 volumes, hardbound
- Pages: 1071

The Slovenský náučný slovník (Slovak encyclopaedia) is the first general encyclopedia in Slovak. It was published in 1932 in three volumes.

== Coverage ==
Slovenský náučný slovník focuses mainly on Slovak topics and less on universal or global topics. According to the editor Pavel Bujnák, "the foreign countries in various educational dictionaries are (…) insufficiently and often tendentiously or maliciously presented about Slovakia. Thus the goal of the first Slovenský náučný slovník was set and the coverage of the particular headwords was determined." Slovenský náučný slovník includes many illustrations and photographs, mostly black and white, as well as maps. It covers the topic of Czechoslovakia generously.
