= State Award for Public Information =

State Award for Public Information (Finnish: Tiedonjulkistamisen valtionpalkinto) is a Finnish award granted by the Ministry of Education and Culture for achievements in public information and the dissemination of knowledge. The award was given first time in 1968. The awards are currently granted on the proposal of the Committee for Public Information (Finnish: Tiedonjulkistamisen neuvottelukunta).

== List of winners ==
=== 2026 ===
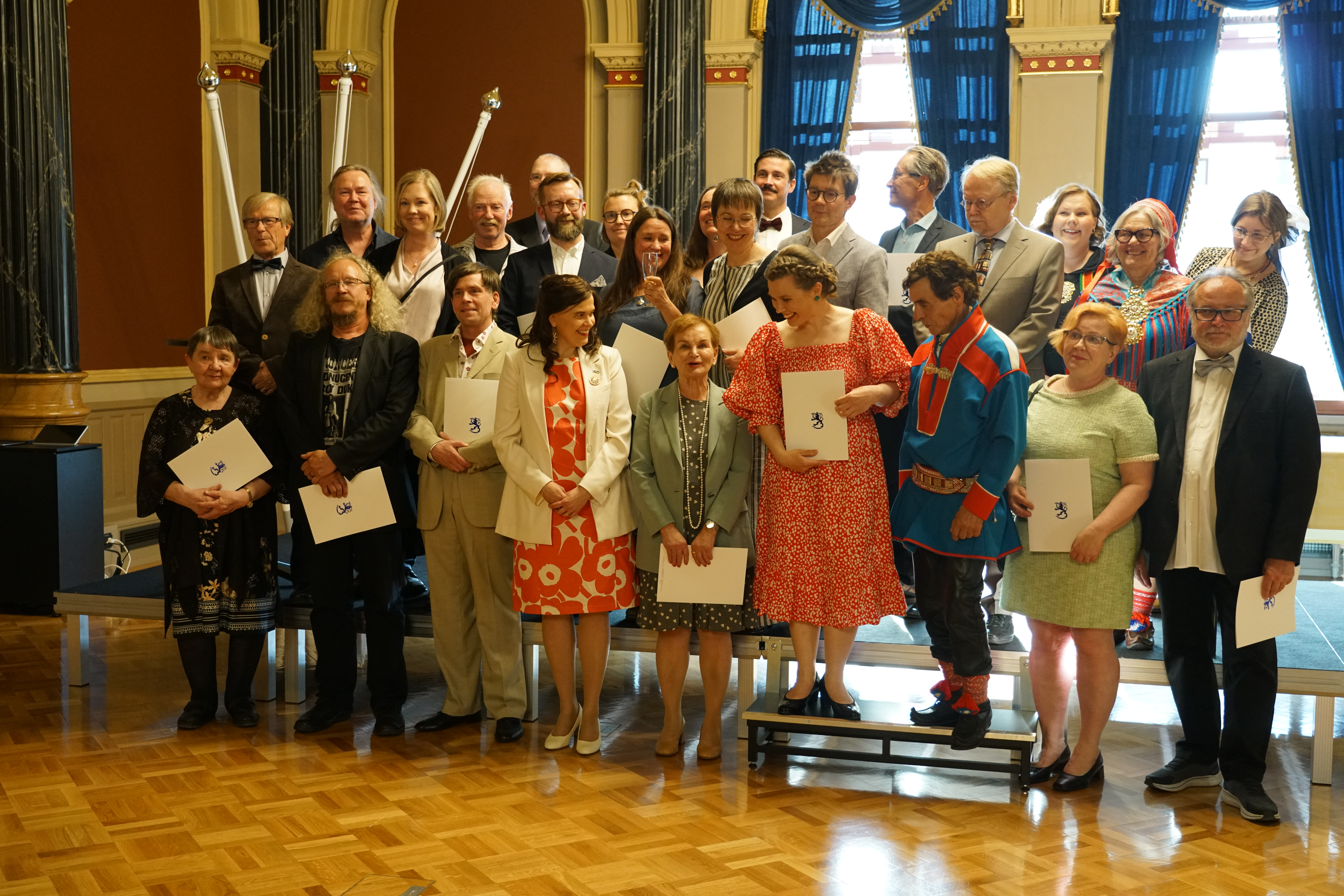
Group portrait from the 2026 Finnish State Awards for Public Information ceremony.

- Commissioners of the Truth and Reconciliation Commission Concerning the Sámi People (Hannele Pokka, Irja Jefremoff, Kari Mäkinen, Anni-Siiri Länsman and Heikki Paltto) for bringing difficult historical experiences to light.
- The makers of the Naturväktarna and Luontoilta nature programmes (incl. producers Annika Löfgren, Christina Staffans and Olli Koski, hosts Joakim Lax and Minna Pyykkö, and their teams of experts) for long-running nature programs and increasing public interest in nature.
- Timo R. Stewart : for the book Palestiina ja Israel. Historia karttoina (Palestine and Israel: History in Maps)
- Leea Lakka : for the book Kapina pulpetissa
- Sonja Koski : for the book Simpanssi sisällämme
- Finnish Wikipedians : for longterm building and maintaining open knowledge
- Finnwatch : for responsible knowledge production and opening societal debate
