= John Harris (writer) =

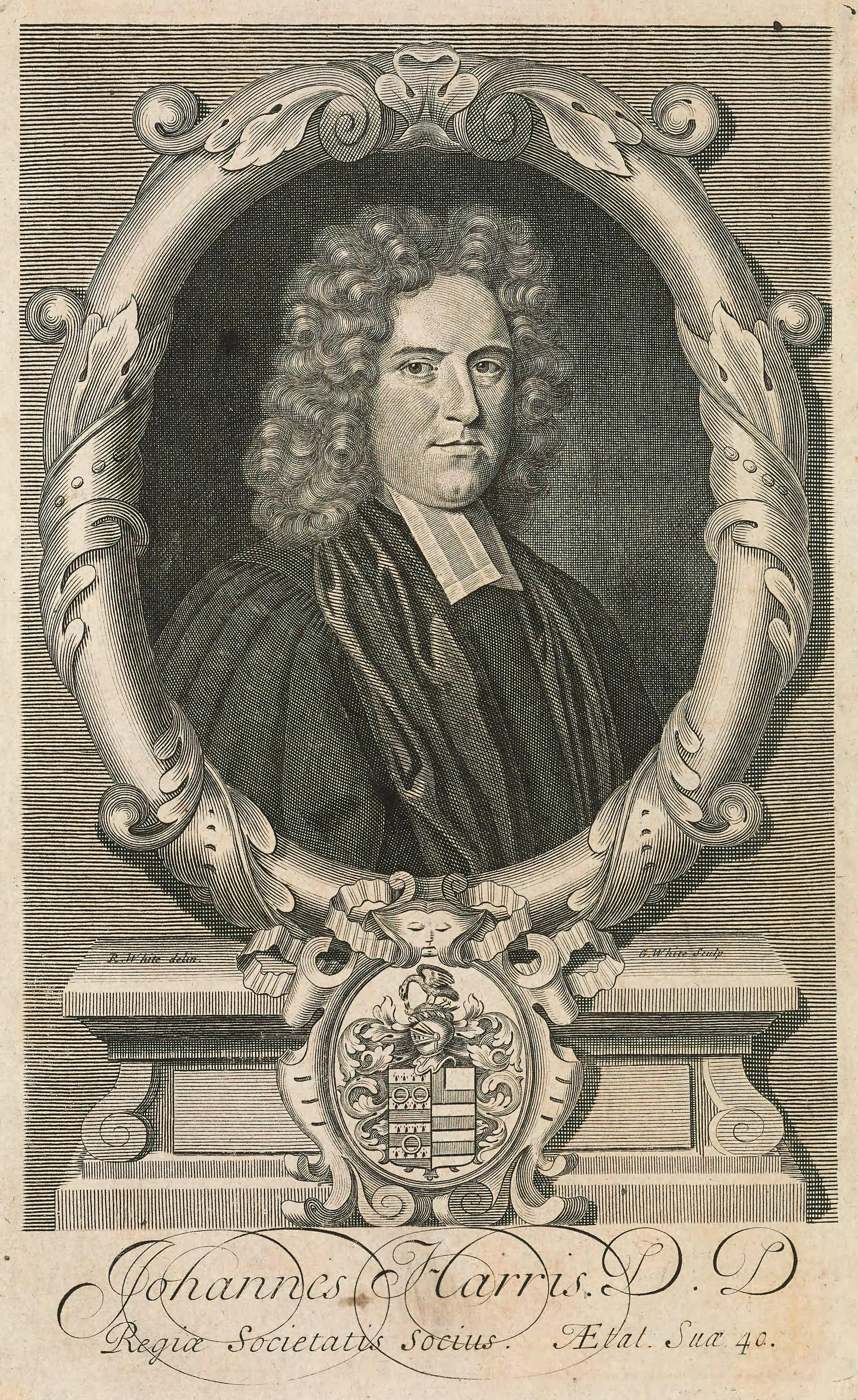
Engraving of John Harris, the frontispiece of Lexicon Technicum

John Harris (c. 1666 – 7 September 1719) was an English writer, scientist, and Anglican priest. He is best known as the editor of the Lexicon Technicum: Or, A Universal English Dictionary of Arts and Sciences (1704), the earliest of the English encyclopaedias; as the compiler of the Complete Collection of Voyages and Travels (1744), published under his name; and as the author of an unfinished county history of Kent.

== Life ==
Harris was born about 1666, probably in Shropshire, and was a scholar of Trinity College, Oxford, from 1684 to 1688. He was presented to the vicarage of Icklesham in Sussex, and subsequently to the rectory of St Thomas, Winchelsea. In 1696 he was elected a Fellow of the Royal Society and published a paper in the Society's Philosophical Transactions on microscope observations of animalcula which included the very first description of a bdelloid rotifer.

In 1698 he gave the seventh series of the Boyle Lectures, Atheistical Objections against the Being of God and His Attributes fairly considered and fully refuted.

Between 1702 and 1704 he delivered at the Marine Coffee House in Birchin Lane, London, the mathematical lectures founded by Sir Charles Cox, and advertised himself as a mathematical tutor at Amen Corner. The friendship of Sir William Cowper secured for him the office of private chaplain, a prebend in Rochester Cathedral (1708), and the rectory of the united London parishes of St Mildred, Bread Street and St Margaret Moses, as well as other preferments.

In politics he showed himself a Whig, and engaged in a bitter quarrel with the Rev. Charles Humphreys, who afterwards was chaplain to the High-Church Tory Henry Sacheverell.

Harris for a time acted as vice-president of the Royal Society. At his death, he was completing an elaborate History of Kent in Five Parts of which the first volume only was published, by D. Midwinter of St Paul's Churchyard, London, in 1719. He is said to have died in poverty brought on by his own bad management of his affairs.

== Works ==
- Astronomical Dialogues Between a Gentleman and a Lady. London, 1719; also
  - Dialoghi astronomici (in Italian). Venezia: Simone Occhi. 1751.
