= Latin Wikipedia =

Latin-language edition of Wikipedia

- The logo of Latin Wikipedia, a globe featuring glyphs from various writing systems

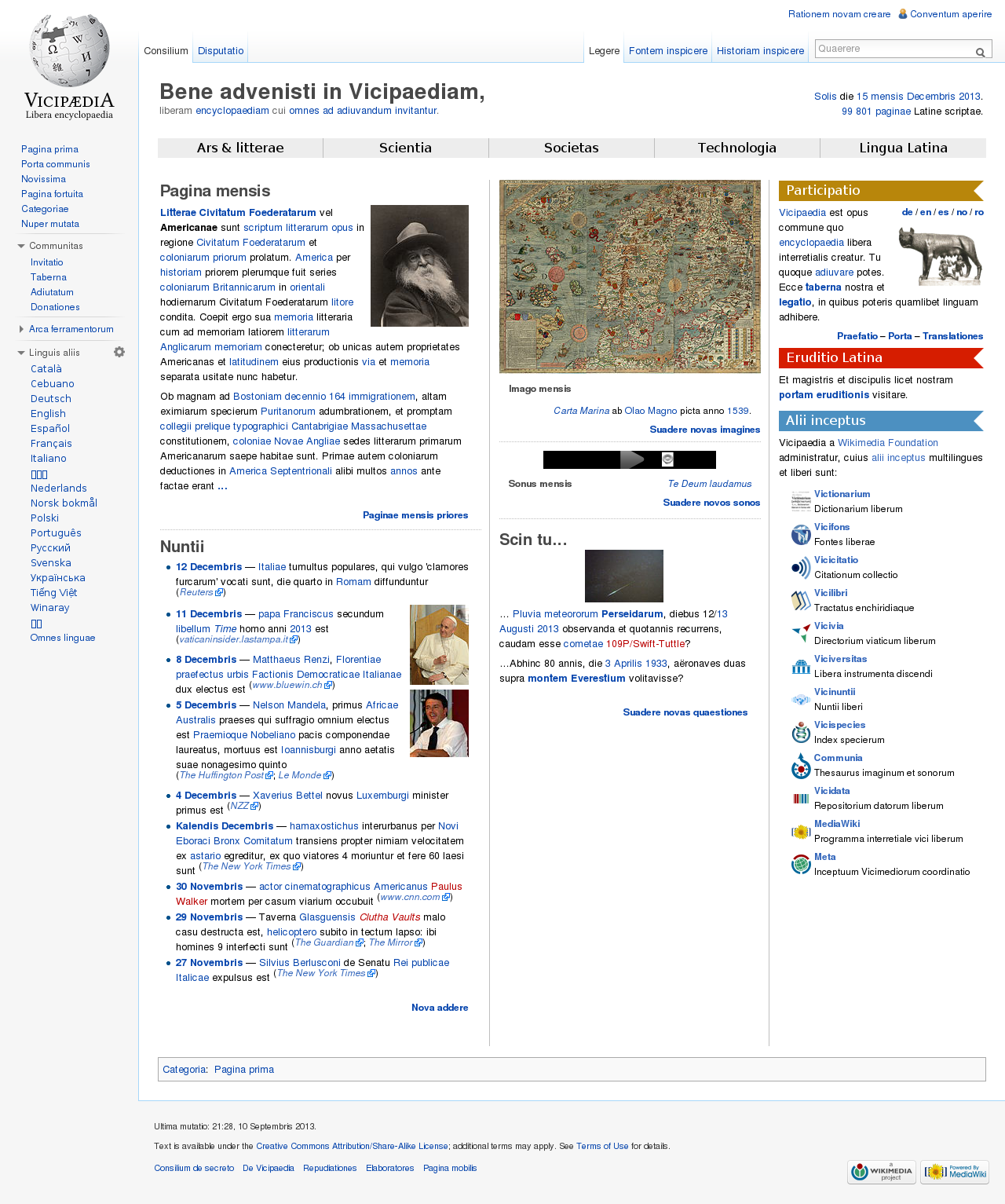
- Main Page of the Latin Wikipedia
- Website type: Online encyclopedia
- Available in: Latin
- Country of origin: United States
- Owner: Wikimedia Foundation
- Creator: Jimmy Wales
- Website: la.wikipedia.org
- Commercial: No
- Users: 193
- Launched: May 2002
- Current status: Active
- Content license: Creative Commons Attribution/ Share-Alike 4.0 (most text also dual-licensed under GFDL); Media licensing varies

The Latin Wikipedia (Latin: Vicipaedia or Vicipaedia Latina) is the Latin language edition of Wikipedia, created in May 2002. As of 27 September 2026, it has 142,413 articles. While all primary content is in Latin, modern languages such as English, Italian, French, German or Spanish are often used in discussions, since many users find this easier.

Professional Latinists have observed a gradual improvement in the encyclopedia. According to Robert Gurval, chairman of the UCLA classics department, "the articles that are good are in fact very good," though some contributors do not write the language perfectly. The Latin Wikipedia was the first edition of Wikipedia written in a defunct language; others such as the Old Church Slavonic Wikipedia came later.

== Modern vocabulary and coining policies ==
When the Latin Wikipedia began, the predominant topics were those having to do with classical history, but beginning in 2006, a group of new contributors greatly expanded the coverage of 20th-century topics, such as pop culture and technology.

The official policy of Vicipaedia is that neologisms and user coinings are not allowed ("Noli fingere!" Latin for "Don't coin/make up things"). In order to deal with concepts that did not exist in Classical or Medieval Latin, terms from modern Latin sources are used, such as botanical Latin, scientific Latin, 18th- and 19th-century Latin language encyclopedias and books, the official Vatican dictionary of modern Latin, as well as current Latin newspapers and radio shows, such as Ephemeris and Radio Bremen.

As in any language with a broad international character, often more than one correct term exists for a given concept (just as in English a certain car part is called a "bonnet" by British speakers but a "hood" by Americans). In Latin the existence of multiple synonyms is even more prevalent since the language has been in continuous use over a wide geographical area for over 2000 years. Sometimes the same concept is represented by different terms in classical, medieval, scientific and modern Latin. In general Vicipaedia adopts the oldest or classical term for the page name, with redirects from any others; major alternatives are listed in the article with footnote references. There is often lively debate among editors about shades of meaning. The practice of avoiding invented words and giving references for alternative terms agrees well with the general Wikipedia insistence on verifiability and the rule against original research.

Many universities and other institutions have official Latin names. In fields where Latin is the current standard language, Vicipaedia normally adopts official names as pagenames, even if they belong to scientific or technical, rather than to classical Latin. This applies to:

- names of Catholic dioceses
- Catholic official titles
- biological species and other taxa
- planets, asteroids, satellites, and constellations
- topographical features on extraterrestrial bodies
- anatomical names
- names of diseases
- names of substances used in medicine

When occasionally a term for a modern concept cannot be found, the customary practice is to do exactly what most other languages do: to borrow an international word (often from a Romance language or English). Such direct borrowing was done for the particle names photon (Latin: photon), and gluon (Latin: gluon) and for the unit of temperature Kelvin (Latin: Kelvinus). The word is given a Latin morphology if this can be done easily, or, if not, used unchanged in its foreign form; but many international words already have a Latin or Graeco-Latin appearance, because Greek and Latin have always served as sources of new scientific terminology.

== Orthography ==
Latin Wikipedia made it policy for all to follow the more widespread contemporary late 20th century orthographical habit of distinguishing u (pronounced as [u]) from v (pronounced as [w] in Classical Latin and as [v] in Ecclesiastical Latin) but not i (pronounced as [i]) from j (pronounced as [j] in both Classical and Ecclesiastical Latin). This orthographical practice was not without detractors, who claimed that it is a copy of the Italian spelling reform in which the i/j distinction is lost but the u/v distinction is maintained.

The Latin Wikipedia logo reads "VICIPÆDIA", displaying the "Æ". However, in accordance with contemporary practice, Vicipaedia does not use ligatures in its articles for the diphthongs written ae ("Æ", "æ") and oe ("Œ", "œ"), even though in Latin a diphthong like the ae in aes is pronounced differently from an hiatus like the ae in aer, both in the classical and even more so in the Italianate pronunciation. The ligatures were adopted by the Romans to save space, and æ and œ in particular were later maintained by Latin typographers to distinguish the diphthong from the hiatus. Latin Wikipedia has chosen another convention, namely to write hiatus with the diaeresis: aë, oë. If Latin Wikipedia users prefer, however, they can activate a gadget under user preferences that automatically displays ae and oe without the diaeresis as ligatures on the pages.

Latin Wikipedia, in common with the majority of paper/parchment Latin media, does not require the marking of long vowels in words (in Latin textbooks this is usually done by adding a macron over a character, as for example, the e in stēlla.) Thus, both terra and terrā are written simply as terra, although the former is in the nominative case, while the latter in the ablative. The context usually makes clear which one is being used, though the use of macron or apex is allowed when the distinction is necessary.

== Gallery ==
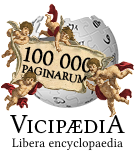
Latin Wikipedia's 100,000 article logo (18 December 2013)

== See also ==
- List of Wikipedias
