= Norwegian State Calendar =

Publication of the Norwegian Government (1815–2012)

The Norwegian State Calendar (Norges Statskalender) was an official publication of the Government of Norway, published annually from 1815 to 2012, and listing the members of the royal house, the government, courts, Parliament, the upper level of the civil service and recipients of state/royal honours. It ceased publication from 1 January 2012, as this information is now found in many other publications.
