= Great Olympic Encyclopedia =

2006 encyclopedia by Valeri Shteinbakh

- The 1st volume cover
- Author: Valeri Shteinbakh
- Language: Russian
- Subject: Olympic Games
- Genre: Reference encyclopedia
- Publisher: Olimpia Press
- Publication date: 2006
- Publication place: Russia
- Media type: Print (Hardcover)
- Pages: 784 pp (1st volume); 968 pp (2nd volume)
- ISBN: 5-94299-088-3

The Great Olympic Encyclopedia (Russian: Большая олимпийская энциклопедия, or БОЭ; transliterated Bolshaya olimpiyskaya entsiklopediya) is the 3rd Olympic encyclopedia in Russian, issued by the Bolshaya Rossiyskaya entsiklopediya state publisher. In 2007, the Great Olympic Encyclopedia has been included in Yandex.Dictionaries.

== Summary ==
The encyclopedia has only one author Valeri Shteinbakh, and contains 10,070 entries about the history of the Ancient Olympic Games, the results of the Summer Olympic Games and the Winter Olympic Games, the sports included or not in the Olympics, biographies of the sportspersons and other trivia.
