= Příruční slovník naučný =

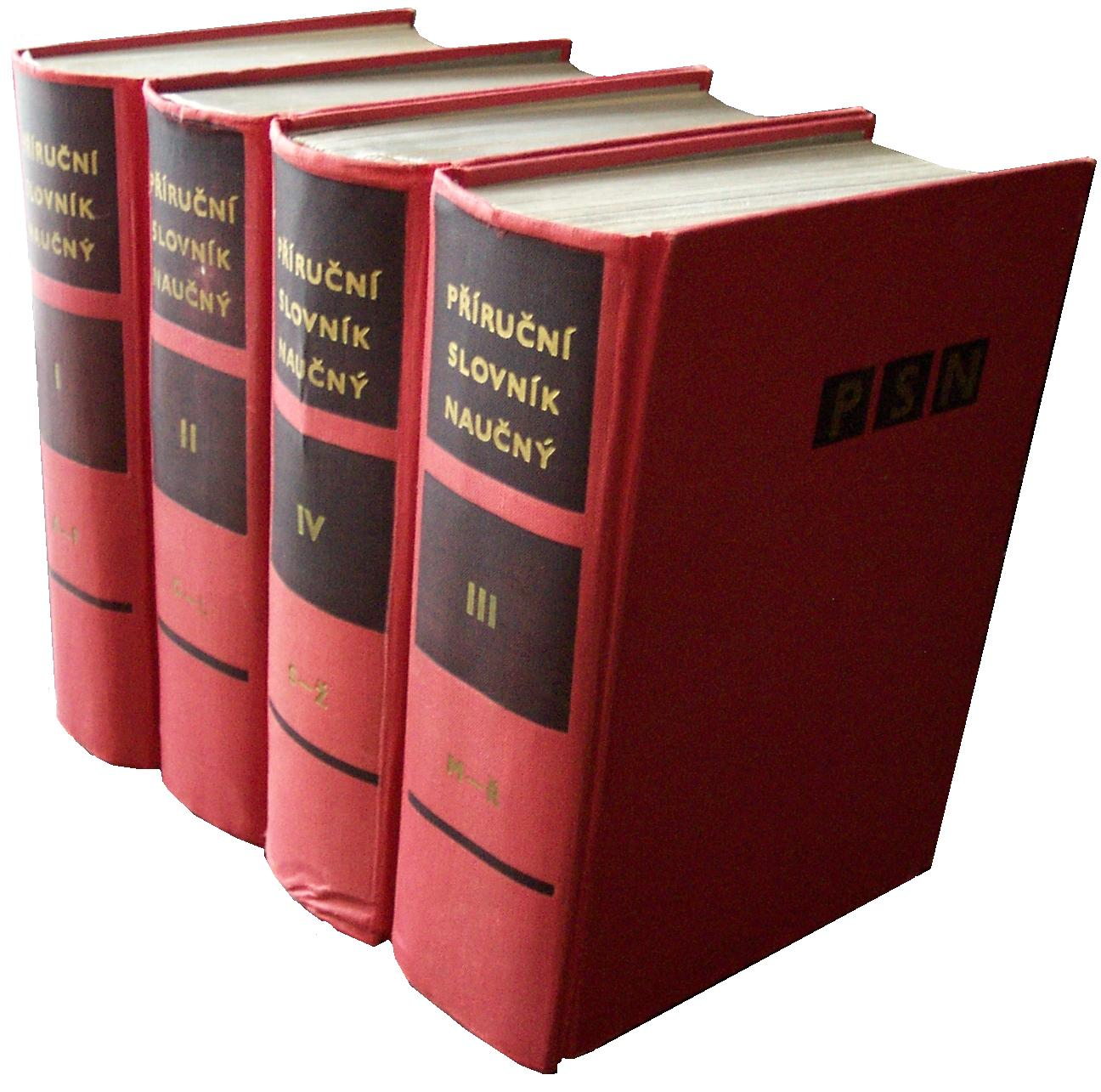
All volumes

Příruční slovník naučný (PSN) was a four-volume encyclopedia in Czech published in Czechoslovakia between 1962 and 1966.

The encyclopedia was published by the Czechoslovak Academy of Sciences. The aim was to displace the older Otto's encyclopedia by a new work, fitting the political views of the Communist Party of Czechoslovakia. Apart from traditional items it contains a large amount of (very flattering) information about the worldwide communist movement and its leaders, and about countries of the Eastern Bloc.

The main editor was academician Vladimír Procházka. The volumes have around 800 to 900 pages of dense print each.

The encyclopedia was mandatorily bought by all organisations in the Czech part of Czechoslovakia; tens of thousands were printed.
