= Oosthoek (encyclopedia) =

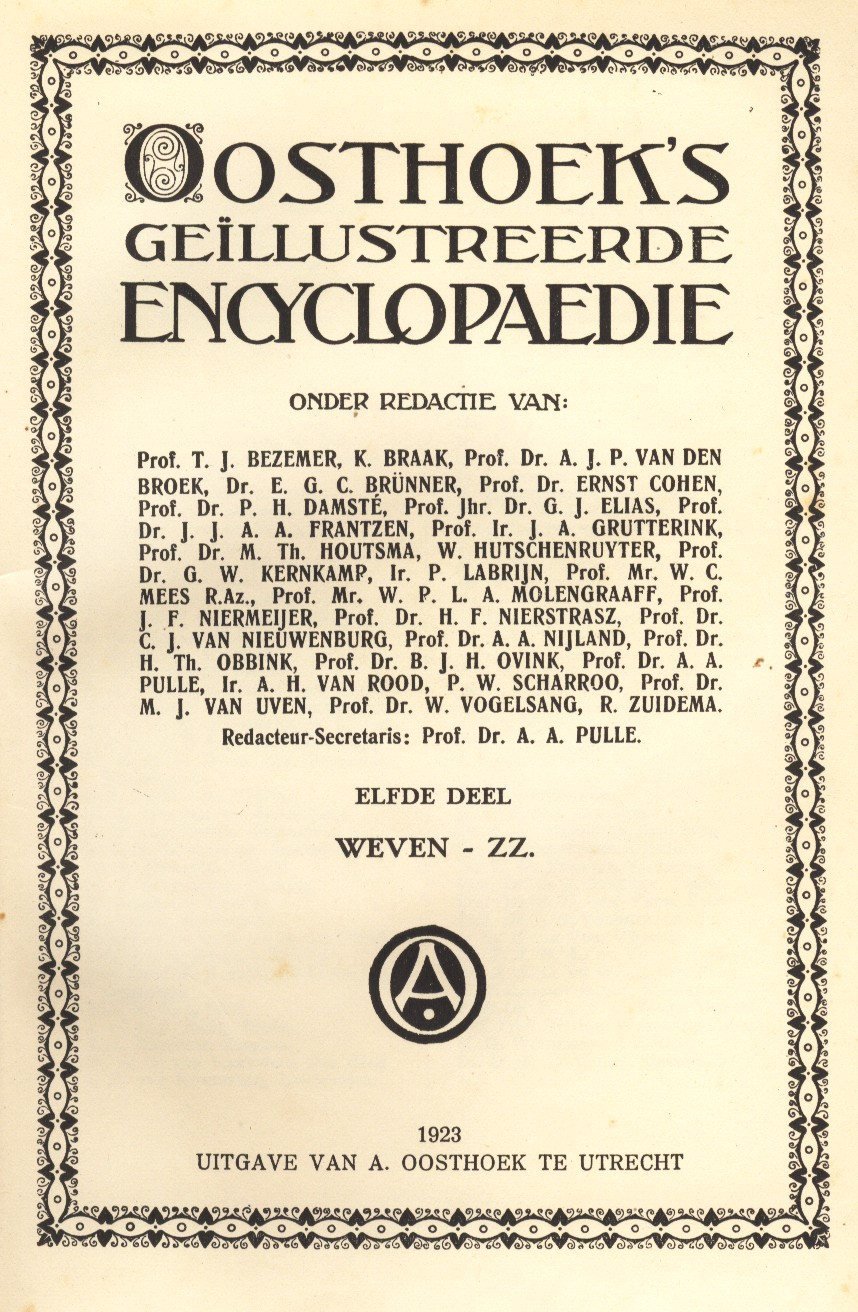
Frontispiece of the first edition of Oosthoek's Geïllustreerde Encyclopaedie (1923)

The Oosthoek is a Dutch encyclopedia, published by Oosthoek's Uitgevers Mij. N.V. in Utrecht, which was founded in 1907 by A. Oosthoek (1876–1949) and which merged with Kluwer in 1970. The encyclopedia is a continuation of Vivat's Geïllustreerde Encyclopedie (11 vols., Amsterdam, 1899–1908), bought by Oosthoek and it appeared from 1916 as Oosthoek's Geïllustreerde Encyclopaedie. The content and illustrations of both Vivat as well as the pre-war editions of Oosthoek are based on the German Meyers Konversations-Lexikon. The 7th and latest edition (1976–81) is titled De Grote Oosthoek.

== Editions ==
De Kleine Oosthoek
Edition	Title	Volumes	Year
1	De Kleine Oosthoek	2	1964–65
2	De Kleine Oosthoek	2	1976

De Grote Oosthoek
Title	Edition	Editor-in-chief	Volumes	Publisher
Oosthoek's Geïllustreerde Encyclopaedie	1ste druk	Redacteur-Secretaris: A.A. Pulle	11 dln. 1916–1923. Supplement (dl. 12) 1925	Utrecht: Oosthoek
Oosthoek's Geïllustreerde Encyclopaedie	2de druk	Redacteur-secretarissen E.C.G. Brünner en H. F. Nierstrasz	12 dln. 1925–32. Supplement (dl. 13) 1934	Utrecht: Oosthoek
Oosthoek's Geïllustreerde Encyclopaedie	3de bijgewerkte en aangevulde druk	Redacteur-secretarissen: H.F. Nierstrasz en E.C.G. Brünner	12 dln. 1932-39	Utrecht: Oosthoek
Oosthoek's Encyclopaedie	4de druk		15 dln. 1947–53. Supplementen (dln. 16 en 17) 1955 en 1957	Utrecht: Oosthoek.
Oosthoeks Encyclopedie	5de druk		15 dln. 1959–64. Supplement (dl. 16) 1966	Utrecht: Oosthoek
Oosthoeks Encyclopedie	6de druk	Hoofdredactie Jac L. Griep en J.A. van Houtte	15 dln. 1968–73. 4 Supplementen (dl. 16–19)	Utrecht: Oosthoek
De Grote Oosthoek. Encyclopedie en woordenboek	7de uitgave	Hoofdredactie Jac L. Griep en J.A. van Houtte	20 dln. 1976–81. Atlas (dl. 21), 1978. Supplementen 1 en 2 1981, 1985	Utrecht: Oosthoek
