= Biblioteca Universale Sacro-Profana =

The Biblioteca universale sacro-profana (1701–07) was an unfinished encyclopedia from the early eighteenth century, published in Italian by the cartographer and Franciscan friar Vincenzo Coronelli.

Coronelli announced the encyclopedia to his Franciscan colleagues in 1696 and began work on it in 1698. By this time, he had been named Minister General in the Franciscan order. Thanks to his position of leadership, he was initially able to bring tremendous resources to bear on the project, but after he was removed from his position as Minister General in 1704, the encyclopedia fell on hard times and soon came to a halt.

The Biblioteca universale was one of the first universal encyclopedias in a European vernacular language with entries arranged alphabetically. It was planned to contain 45 volumes, but only 7 volumes appeared, reaching the letter C.
