= Dicționar enciclopedic român =

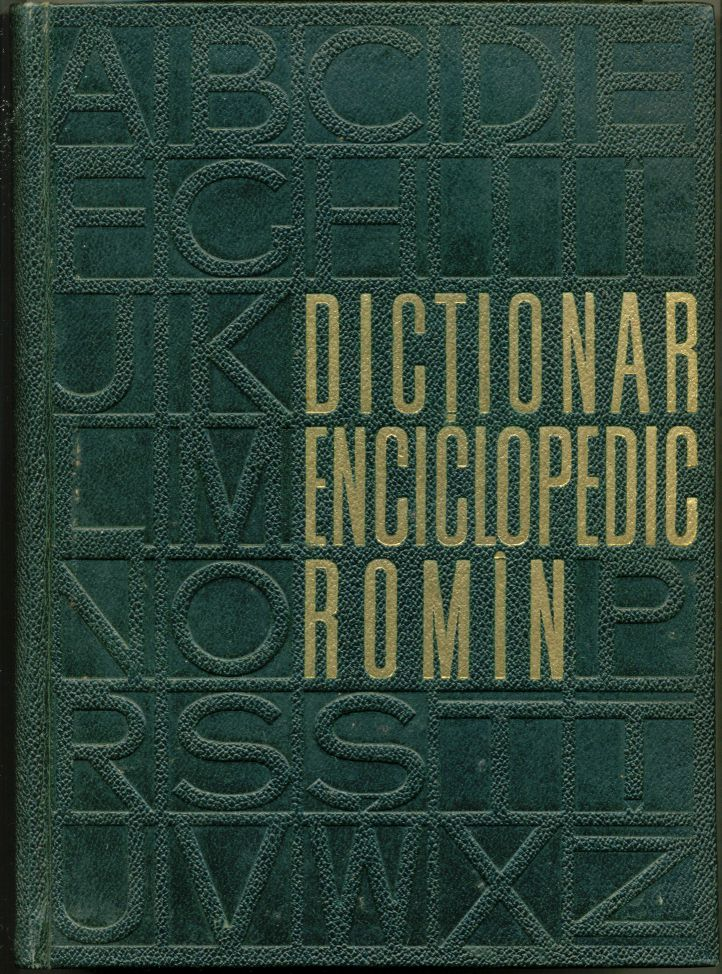

The Dicționar enciclopedic român is a Romanian encyclopedia published by Editura Politica between 1962 and 1966. It contained many specialized articles as well as biographical articles on topics in Romanian and universal culture.

== Overview ==
The Dicționar enciclopedic român was developed under the auspices of the Academy of the People's Republic of Romania (later the academy of the Socialist Republic of Romania, after the name change in 1965.) Volumes one and two were published under the title Dicționar enciclopedic romîn in conformity with the Romanian orthographic regulations of 1953.

== Content ==
The encyclopedia had a total of approximately 3,700 pages and 46,000 words. There were about 6000 illustrations and over 200 charts and maps.

Volume	Year published	letters covered	Pages
1	1962	A–C	880
2	1964	D–J	945
3	1965	K–P	911
4	1966	Q–Z	959

== Contributors ==
There were more than 400 individual authors working on this project, divided into 21 teams: agriculture and forestry; art; biology, botany and zoology; chemistry; law; economics; logic, philosophy, the history of religion and atheism; physics; geography and geology; medieval history, modern history, and contemporary history; history of the labour movement; ancient history and archaeology; linguistics; romanian literature; world literature; mathematics and astronomy; human medicine, biochemistry, pharmacology and physical culture; military affairs; psychology and pedagogy; Scientific socialism and press; technology.

The main editorial Committee was composed of the following individuals:

- President: Acad Athanase Joja
- Principle coordinator: Prof. univ. Dimitrie Macrea, MC al Academiei RPR
- Members: Prof. univ. George Bărănescu, MC al Academiei RPR, Acad. Mihai Beniuc, Acad. Elie Carafoli, Acad. Șerban Cioculescu, Prof. univ. Florin Ciorăscu, MC al Academiei RPR, Acad. Constantin Daicoviciu, Acad. Virgil Ianovici, Acad. Traian Ionașcu, Acad. Gheorghe Ionescu-Sisești, Acad. Iorgu Iordan, Conf. Univ. George Ivașcu, Acad. Vasile Malinschi, Acad. Cornel Micloși, Acad. Ștefan Milcu, Acad. Grigore Moisil, Acad. Ilie Murgulescu, Acad. George Oprescu, Acad. Andrei Oțetea, Acad. Emil Pop, Acad. Călin Popovici, Acad. Mihai Ralea, Acad. Remus Răduleț, Prof. univ. ing. Valter Roman, Acad. Alexandru Roșca, General de armată Iacob Teclu, Acad. Șerban Țițeica, Acad. Nicolaie Teodorescu, Gheorghe Vasilichi, Acad. Tudor Vianu.

== Bibliography ==
- Academia Republicii Popular Române, Dicționar enciclopedic român, Editura Politică, București, 1962-1966
