= Barnens lexikon =

Swedish 1981 children's encyclopedia

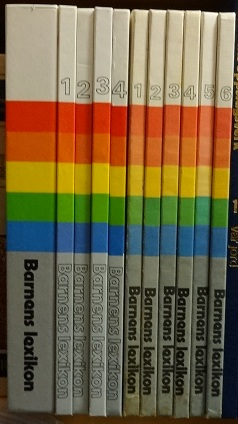
- Barnens lexikon
- Author: Lars Gunnar Larsson (text); Hardy Hedman (text)
- Illustrator: Tord Nygren
- Country: Sweden
- Language: Swedish
- Genre: children/non-fiction
- Published: 1981
- No. of books: 6

Barnens lexikon was a series of Swedish encyclopedias for children of various ages published in a number of editions.

It was originally published in 1981 following an idea from Sven Lidman. A later edition was published in 2003 under the title Barnens A till Ö.

The first edition was published in four volumes. A six-volume edition with identical contents was released for the members of Barnens bokklubb. The first edition contained 2 500 entries accompanied by 1 200 coloured images drawn by Tord Nygren. As publishing loomed closer Nygren needed to produce 50 drawings per week. At an average rate of 2 hours per drawing he had to work 15-hour shifts seven days a week to finish on time.
