= Northern Sámi Wikipedia =

Northern Sami–language edition of Wikipedia

Northern Sami Wikipedia
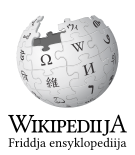
- Website type: Internet encyclopedia project
- Available in: Northern Sami
- Owner: Wikimedia Foundation
- Website: se.wikipedia.org
- Commercial: No
- Registration: Optional
- Content license: Creative Commons Attribution/ Share-Alike 4.0 (most text also dual-licensed under GFDL); Media licensing varies

The Northern Sami Wikipedia is the edition of Wikipedia in the Northern Sami language.

It was used as one example of how Wikipedia's categories system works (in the context of social ontologies).

== Statistics ==
It started in 2004 and has 7,907 articles, ranking 195th of all Wikipedias.

Readers

It is 134th of about 290 in number of page requests; there are half a million page requests per month, but it's not possible to know how many of these are human readers.

Content

It is 137th of about 290 in number of articles (there are 7,907); articles are about 500 characters long on average, with approximately 400,000 words in total. It's above average in terms of editors/speakers and articles/speakers. There are many articles about towns around the world (mostly automated creations).

User activity

There were almost no new articles in 2008–2011, and new articles usually come in bursts; in 2013, editing activity was lower than in previous years, with fewer than 10 active editors per month making fewer than 100 edits per month. There are currently 24 active users and activity is still low.
