= Facta (encyclopedia) =

Finnish encyclopedia

- Language: Finnish
- Genre: Encyclopedia
- Publisher: Tietosanakirja Oy; WSOY
- Publication date: 1969–2011
- Publication place: Finland

Facta is an encyclopedia in Finnish. It was published as a series of 11 volumes with more than 150,000 entries between 1969 and 1974. It describes subjects from a Finnish point of view. It was run by editors in chief Veli Valpola and Maija Numminen and published by Tietosanakirja Oy.

Facta was followed in the 1980s–2000s by the Facta 2001 series with additional volumes, the 22 volumes of which contain approximately 100,000 search terms. The Facta 2001 book series has also been published in digital editions, including the encyclopedia CD-Facta (1994) published on CD-ROM. Finally, Facta (whose last volume was completed in 2007) lived on as an Internet service for several years, but it was discontinued at the end of 2011 as unprofitable.
