= Norsk Allkunnebok =

Norwegian encyclopedia

Norsk Allkunnebok is a Norwegian encyclopedia published in ten volumes in Nynorsk language by the publishing house Fonna Forlag from 1948 to 1966. When the first volume came out in 1948, 235 people were involved in the production of content. The articles were signed and there was something new in a Norwegian encyclopedia. Allkunneboka focused on conditions in Norway. It is the only major encyclopedia in Nynorsk. The encyclopedia contains a lot of statistical details, particularly about the primary industries. Some of the material is not found elsewhere and is valuable for posterity, while other parts are out of date. Themes outside Norway are hardly dealt with. The photographs are in black and white.

Principal editor was Arnulv Sudmann.
