= Uusi tietosanakirja (1929) =

Finnish encyclopedia

- Language: Finnish
- Genre: Encyclopedia
- Publication date: 1929–1932
- Publication place: Finland

Uusi tietosanakirja (1929) is an encyclopedia in Finnish. It was published as a series of 2 volumes in 1929 and 1932. It describes subjects from a Finnish point of view. The Chief editor was Väinö Hämeen-Anttila and its publisher was Karisto.
