= An Universal History of Arts and Sciences =

An Universal History of Arts and Sciences was a two-volume encyclopedia compiled in English by the French expatriate Dennis (or Denis) de Coetlogon. It was published in 209 weekly installments from 1741 to 1745. In his preface, Coetlogon criticized Ephraim Chambers' Cyclopaedia and other extant dictionaries of the arts and sciences for conveying superficial information and not supporting true education. To remedy the problem, Coetlogon chose to base his encyclopedia on "treatises" rather than articles. In the end, the Universal History comprised 169 treatises averaging around fifteen pages in length but varying widely from a mere fourteen lines ("Cosmography") to 113 pages ("Geography"). It is likely that the example of the Universal History played a role in the adoption of treatises in the first edition (1771) of the Encyclopaedia Britannica a few decades later.
