= Grande Enciclopédia Portuguesa e Brasileira =

Grande Enciclopédia Portuguesa e Brasileira (Great Portuguese and Brazilian Encyclopaedia) is a Portuguese 40-volume encyclopedia, published between 1936 and 1960 by Editorial Enciclopédia.

It is both a dictionary, focusing on the study and the presentation of the words of the Portuguese language, and an encyclopaedia, covering all branches of knowledge. Articles are illustrated by drawings, photographs and maps. It is an especially rich resource for the history and culture of Portugal, and for some decades it was considered as the standard encyclopedia in Portugal.

10 supplemental volumes were published between 1981 and 1987.

In 1998-1999 another six-volume supplement was published by a new company, Edições Zairol.
