= Uusi tietosanakirja (1960) =

Finnish encyclopedia

- Language: Finnish
- Genre: Encyclopedia
- Publication date: 1960–1972
- Publication place: Finland

Uusi tietosanakirja is an encyclopedia in Finnish. It was published as a series of 26 volumes in 1960 and 1972. It describes subjects from a Finnish point of view. Chief editor was Veli Valpola and publisher, Tietosanakirja Oy.

Volumes 1–24 were published in 1960–1966 and supplementary volumes 1 and 2 in 1972. They contain a total of 130,000 articles, making the new encyclopedia the most extensive Finnish-language encyclopedia. 30,000 sets were sold.
