= Language School "Dr. Petar Beron" =

Foreign language secondary school

Coordinates: 42°16′35.3″N 22°40′34.5″E

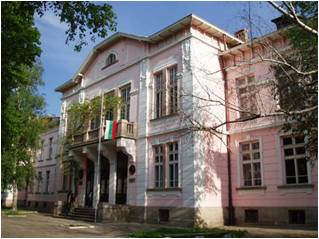
- Kyustendil; Bulgaria

Information
- Type: Public High School
- Motto: The limits of my language are the limits of my world
- Established: 1987
- Principal: Ivanka Yankova
- Grades: 8–12
- Campus: Urban
- Colors: Purple & Yellow
- Website: http://www.egkn-bg.hit.bg/

Foreign Language School "Dr. Petar Beron" is a secondary school in Kyustendil, Bulgaria, established in 1987, initially opening two classes in English, expanding to French, German and Russian the following year, and Spanish being added to the curriculum in more recent years. The school teaches the foreign language exclusively in the first year of the five-year study, then offering the STEM subjects in the respective language from Year 2. The educational process lasts 5 years (8-12 grades). It is situated in a baroque building, originally built for a hunting lodge of Ferdinand I of Bulgaria in 1904.

The school is named after 19th century Bulgarian educator Petar Beron.
