= Pieni tietosanakirja =

Finnish encyclopedia

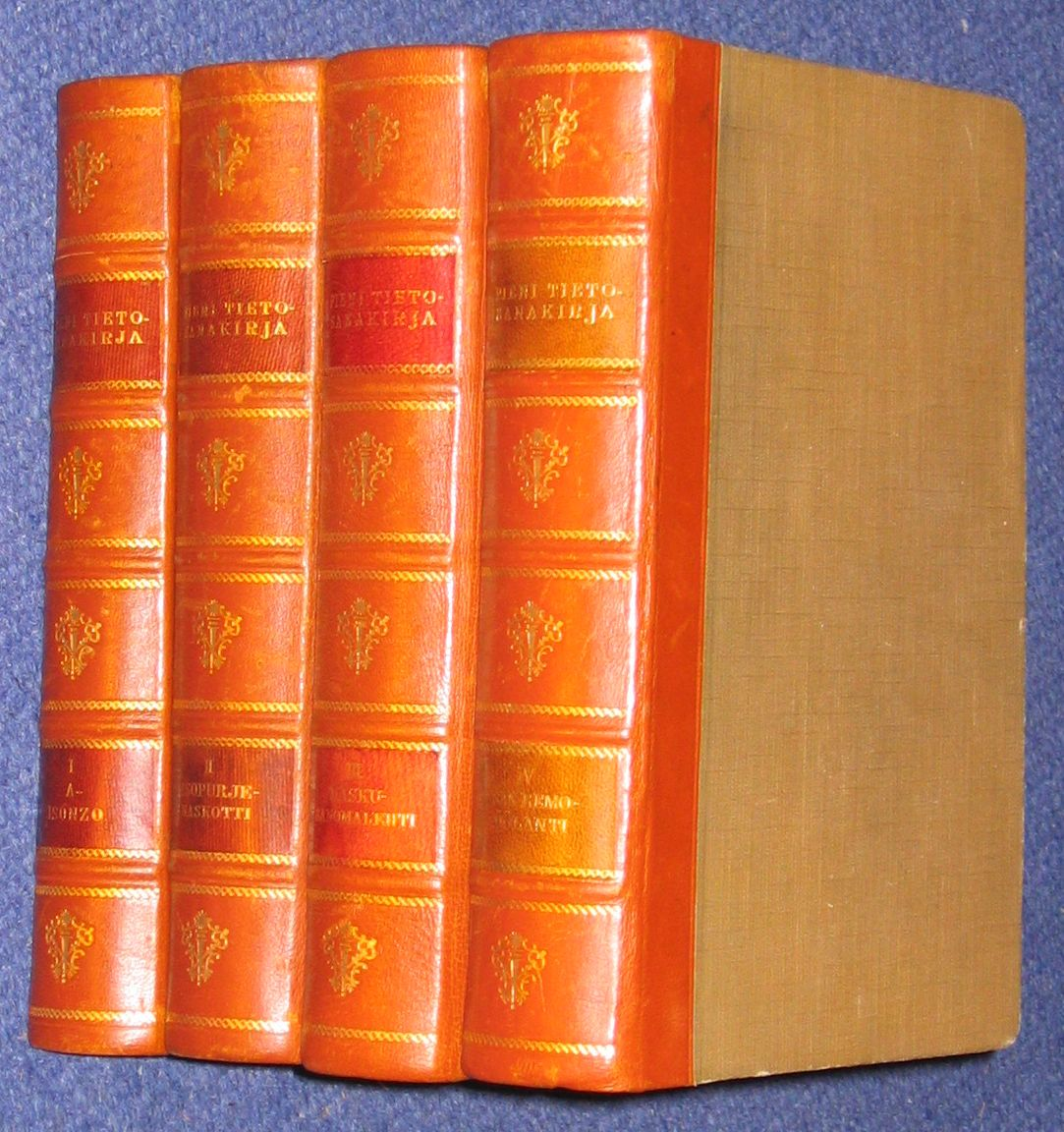
Pieni tietosanakirja, all four volumes

Pieni tietosanakirja ("The Small Encyclopedia") (1925-1928), published by Otava in four volumes, was the second Finnish-language encyclopedia. It followed the earlier, eleven-volume Tietosanakirja.

Being published more than 70 years ago, Project Runeberg considers the original edition of Pieni tietosanakirja to be in the public domain.

Otava also released two updated versions of the book, the first in 1952, the second in 1958–1959, both in four volumes.

== List of volumes ==
- I. A - Isonzo. Helsinki: Tietosanakirja. 1926.
- II. Isopurje - Maskotti. Helsinki: Tietosanakirja. 1926.
- III. Masku - Sanomalehti. Helsinki: Tietosanakirja. 1927.
- IV. San Remo - Öölanti. Helsinki: Tietosanakirja. 1928.
