= Encyclopedia Lituanica =

Lithuanian encyclopedia

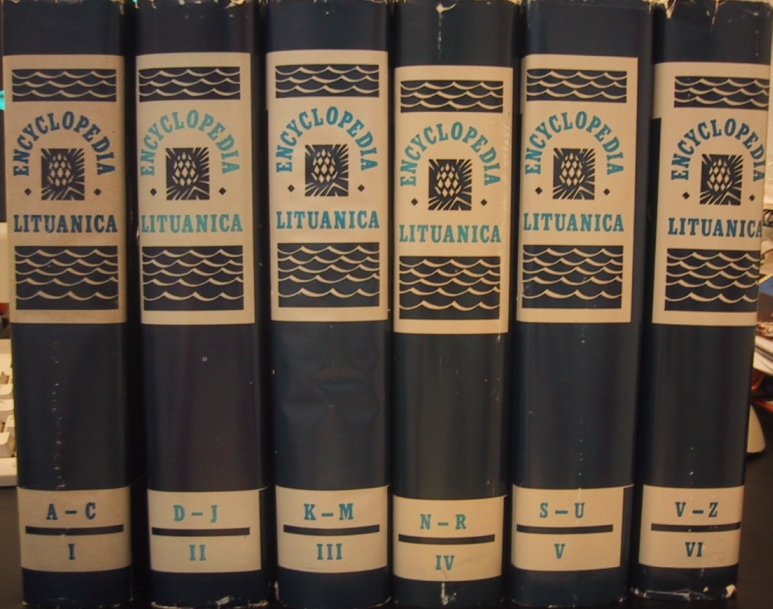
Six volumes of Encyclopedia Lituanica

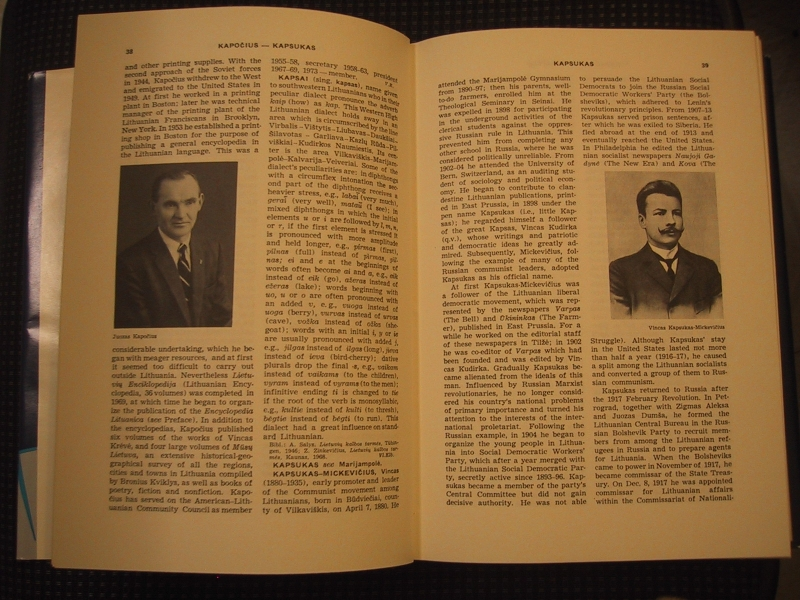
An open volume of Encyclopedia Lituanica with picture of publisher Juozas Kapočius on the left

Encyclopedia Lituanica (likely named after Encyclopædia Britannica or Encyclopedia Americana) is a six-volume (about 3600-page) English language encyclopedia about Lithuania and Lithuania-related topics. It was published between 1970 and 1978 in Boston, Massachusetts by Lithuanian Americans who fled Soviet occupation at the end of World War II. To this day, it remains the only such comprehensive work on Lithuania in the English language.

The encyclopedia was compiled and published by the same individuals who had published Lietuvių enciklopedija, a 35-volume general encyclopedia in the Lithuanian language, in 1953-1966. Later, two volumes of additions and supplements were added and the 37th and last volume was published in 1985. The undertaking was made extremely complicated by the fact that most sources and resources were behind the Iron Curtain in the Soviet Union. Some of the entries in Encyclopedia Lituanica come from this earlier work, which had about two-fifths of its content devoted to Lithuania-related topics. Thus a majority of entries were first written in Lithuanian and later translated into English. However, observers note a good quality of translations.

The encyclopedia was published by Lithuanian Encyclopedia Press, founded and owned by Juozas Kapočius. He was awarded the Order of the Lithuanian Grand Duke Gediminas in 1995. It was edited by Simas Sužiedėlis, and at the end of the last volume it lists 197 contributors; only a handful of them are non-Lithuanians.

== See also ==
- Lithuanian encyclopedias
