= Maurice Dessertenne =

French painter and illustrator

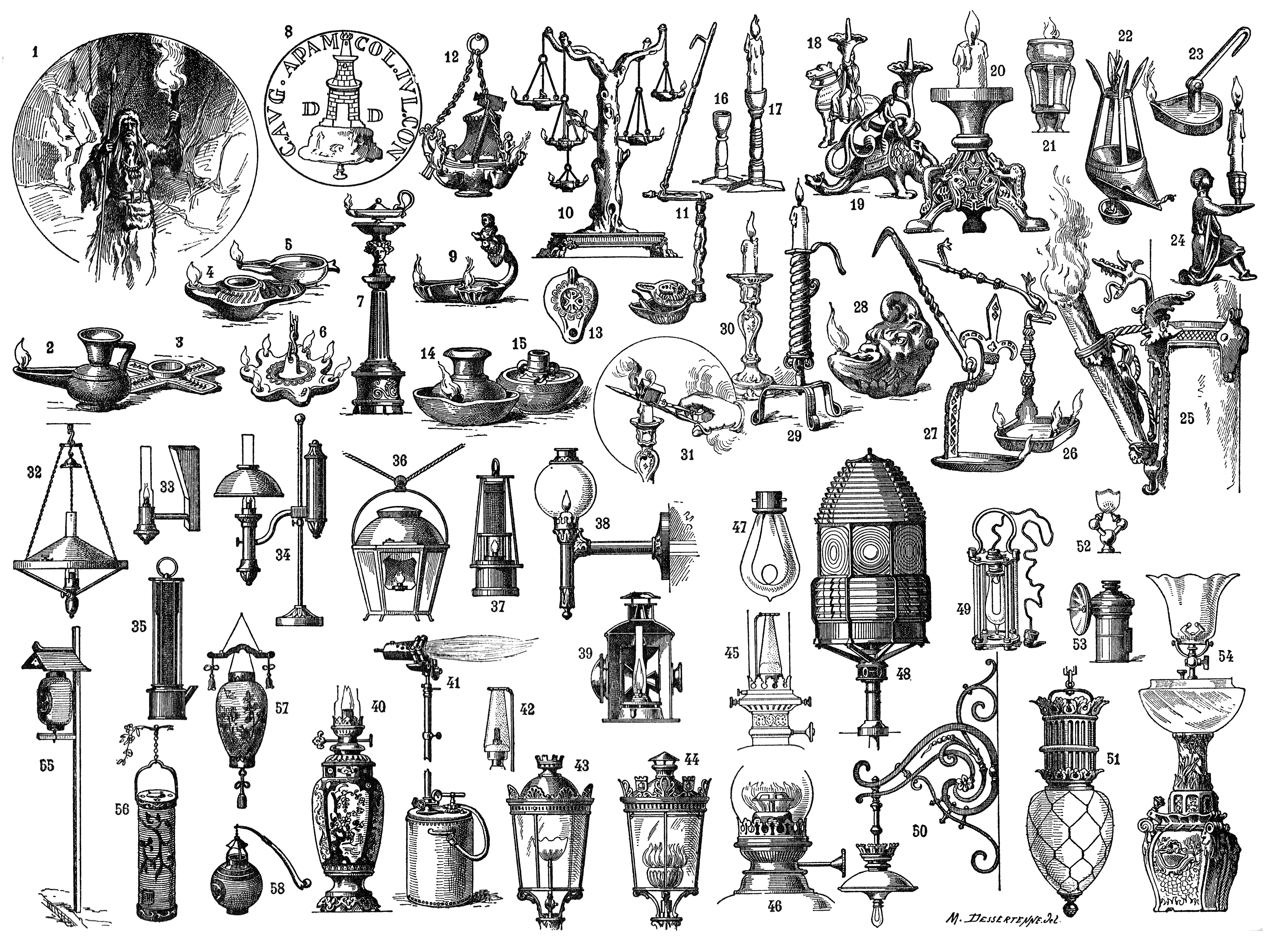
Lighting through the ages. Illustration by Dessertenne for the Nouveau Larousse illustré.

Jacques Maurice Dessertenne (1867, Roussillon-en-Morvan, dept. Saône-et-Loire – after 1926) was a French painter and illustrator, with an active career between about 1897 and the mid-1920s.

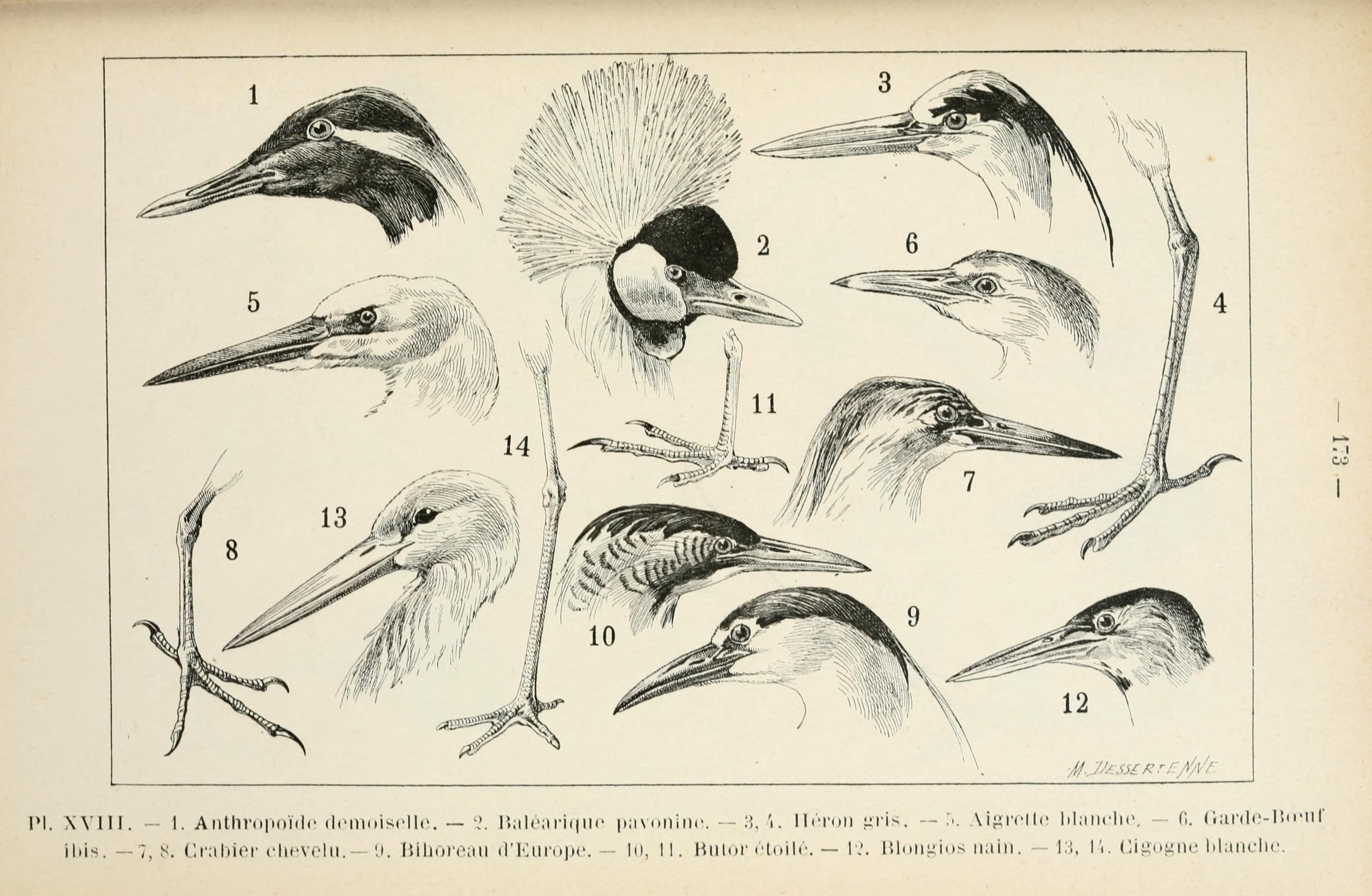
Les Oiseaux d'Europe, sketches by Dessertenne.

Desertenne studied under artists: Joseph Blanc, Jean Paul Laurens, Antoine Étex and Charles-Gabriel Forget and later was mostly active in Paris. Among his range of works are zoological and anatomical copperplate engravings, paintings, and drawings. He was known for his portraits, historia, and genre work created, and illustrations provided for books. In his later years Maurice Desertenne lived part time in Mussy-sur-Seine, department Aube, a commune situated in the southern Champagne wine region bordering Burgundy, where he painted landscapes and sceneries.

Desertenne had been a member of ″Societé des Artistes français″. He worked for Paul Paris (1875–1938), a French naturalist who specialised in ornithology, and created illustrations for the Larousse dictionaries. The painter and draughtsman Jacques-Henri Dessertenne (1906–1987) was his son. He also had a daughter, Jacqueline (1908–1924), which died of tuberculosis. Both children were born and raised in Paris. Maurice and Jacques-Henri collaborated on some work.

Son Jacques was later marrying his wife, Simonne. Together they found a well known art supplies store on what is today Avenue René Coty. The Dessertennes are visited by artists Georges Braque, Fernand Léger among others, and Denise and Raymond Peynet to whom they developed a close acquaintance.

== Impact ==
Maurice Dessertenne's illustrations are featured in many of the Éditions Larousse illustrated encyclopedias. He was the author of all illustrations in the first-generation Larousse Classique Illustré and one of the prominent illustrators of the Nouveau Larousse Illustré and the Petit Larousse. He is considered one of the master illustrators of the early 20th century and is one of the artists responsible for the development of a specific esthetic of ornamental dictionary illustration in France.

== Works ==
- «L'Oncle Bontemps», 1 vol. (266 p.). Author: Olivier Darc; illustrations: M. Dessertenne; editor: Librairie E. Ducrocq, Paris 1895.
- «Les Oiseaux d'Europe» : Tableaux Synoptiques, 1 vol. (249 p.). Author: Paul Paris; illustrations: M. Dessertenne; editor: Lucien Laveur, Paris 1906.
- «L'Orpheline d'Alsace», 1 vol. (126 p.). Author: Henri Le Verdier; illustrations: Maurice Dessertenne; editor: Albin Michel, Paris ca. 1910.
- «Anatomie du Corps humain» _ (planche découpée). Notice bibliographique, Larousse Médical illustré, Paris 1924; page 15.
- «Le Beau visage de la patrie. Introduction à un essai d'esthétique rurale» : Poème en prose qu'un instituteur dédie à la chère mémoire d'Eugène Carrière – portrait hors texte de M. Dessertenne, 1 vol. (64 p.). Author: Louis Dumont; préface: G. Séailles; illustrations: P. Combet-Descombes; editor: Bibliothèque de l'Éducateur, Paris 1923.
- «Guide de la navigation de plaisance sur le Léman», 2 vol. (104 p., 282 p.). Author: G. Lefranc (Président Société nautique du Léman français, texts), M. Schellenberg (cartography); illustrations: M. Dessertenne, G. Frichot; editor: Librairie P. Pellissier, Thonon-les-Bains 1926.
