= Petar Beron =

Bulgarian academic (died 1871)

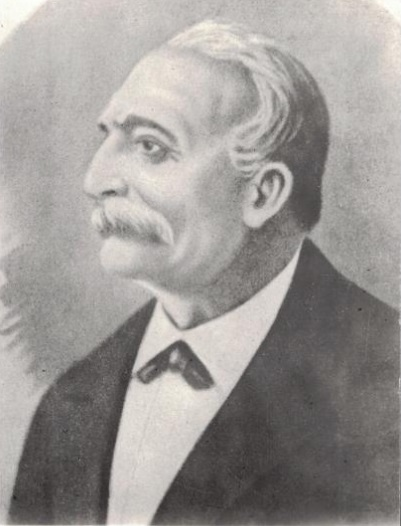
Petar Beron

Petar Beron (Bulgarian: Петър Берон; died 21 March 1871) was a Bulgarian educator, scientist, doctor, and patron of arts. Beron was among the early figures of the Bulgarian National Revival.

He created the first modern Bulgarian primer, known as the Fish Primer (Bulgarian: Рибен буквар, romanized: Riben bukvar) due to a whale drawn in the end of the book.

== Biography ==
Petar Beron was born in the town of Kotel, Ottoman Empire (modern Bulgaria), to a rich family of merchants. Beron's family name was Hadžiberović. His family was affected by the Russo-Turkish War of 1806–1812. The Turkish authorities in Kotel disowned his father after he had sympathised with the Russian forces. His exact birth date is unknown, but per researcher Jeannette Sampinon, it was 1799 or 1800 based on an university application. Per historian Mercia MacDermott, he was born in 1795 or 1797. According to other sources, he was born in 1800. Per historian Roumen Daskalov, he was born in 1795. In Kotel, he received his primary education at a church school, studying under teachers Stoyko Vladislavov and Rayno Popovich. Lacking money, Beron halted his education and became an apprentice tailor, working first in Kotel, and from 1815, in Varna. From 1817 to 1821, he studied at the Greek Princely Academy of Bucharest, partly under Greek educator Konstantinos Vardalachos. He supported the Greek cause in his early years. Beron supported the 1821 uprising, for which he was named in a list of unwanted foreigners.

Beron moved to Brașov in Transylvania, which was part of the Habsburg Empire. He ended up changing his identification from Greek to Bulgarian. In Braşov, Beron worked as a tutor for the family of Anton Iovanovič Kamburovoglu, a merchant who was from Sliven. He became involved in a Bulgarian cultural circle in the city. In 1825 and 1826, he studied at Heidelberg University, consisting of two semesters of philosophy and one semester of medicine. Later, he moved to the Faculty of Medicine of the Ludwig-Maximilians-Universität München, where he studied from 1826 to 1831. In 1831, Beron became one of the first Bulgarians to defend a medical dissertation, as well as becoming the first Bulgarian obstetrician/gynaecologist. From 1832, Beron worked as a physician in Bucharest and Craiova. He also worked in a small trading company with his cousin and business partner Nikola Hristov Berov, which was successful. From 1839, Beron gave up medicine and became involved in science. As an encyclopaedist and Enlightenment scholar, he worked in the fields of physics, astronomy, mathematics, geology, atmospherology, chemistry, meteorology and philosophy.

Beron supported the Bulgarian educational movement, having his publisher send copies of his books to libraries and schools throughout the Ottoman Bulgarian lands. He also supported schools throughout Ottoman Bulgaria with books, financial donations and teachers. Beron established and supported schools in Kotel, Elena, Shumen, Sliven, Stara Zagora, Tarnovo, Ruse, Târgoviște, Kazanlak, Yambol and others. He also paid attention to female education and assisted in establishing many girls' schools. In 1840, in a letter to his hometown Kotel, Beron requested the creation of an organisation which would supervise education. As one of the first Bulgarian scientists, he was given the honorary title "Bulgarian Lomonosov". He was also among the first Bulgarian patrons of the arts. His educational support was crucial for the establishment of education in Ottoman Bulgaria.

Beron moved to Paris in 1843, where he lived for most of his life. On 21 March 1871, two intruders strangled him to death in his home in Craiova. His house was ransacked and his wallet was stolen. Beron's murderers were arrested by the Romanian authorities and sentenced to life imprisonment with hard labour. His nephew, Stefan Ruskov Beron, renounced his share of the inheritance, so that more money would be contributed towards education.

== Works and views ==
Beron was among the early figures of the Bulgarian National Revival. During his lifetime, he published 32 books. In 1824, with the financial support of Iovanovič, he published his only book in Bulgarian titled Primer with Various Instructions (Bulgarian: Буквар с различни поучения, romanized: Bukvar s razlichni poucheniya) for modern Bulgarian secular schools, but it is known as the Fish Primer (Bulgarian: Рибен буквар, romanized: Riben bukvar) because of a drawing of a whale at the end of the book. In the introduction, he advocated for the Bell-Lancaster mutual teaching method (with which he became familiar at the Greek Princely Academy in Bucharest in 1820). The book followed the model of Greek educator Dimitrios Darvaris' Eklogar. It had around 34 editions. The book had a significant impact on the Bulgarian educational system as the first modern schoolbook written in the language. It also assisted in the early development of Bulgarian secular education. The book was itself a small encyclopaedia for children. It marked the end of the ecclesiastical phase of the Bulgarian Revival.

He wrote in French, German, Greek, Latin and Bulgarian. His works encompass almost all fields of knowledge, including physics, chemistry, meteorology, history and moral philosophy. He was the first Bulgarian scholar on the European level. Beron was familiar with Hegelian philosophy.

As an educational reformer, Beron wanted to ensure that Bulgarian education would meet the practical needs of life. He believed in the intuitive method of teaching, such as by taking pupils to the fields, so that they can learn practically. For him, teaching was a "sacred cause", not to be done by civil servants, artisans, or people whose first thought was financial reward. His works include The origin of the physical, natural, metaphysical and moral sciences and Text for the cosmobiographical Atlas in 1858 and the Meteorological Atlas in 1860. The illustrations in the atlases were made by Bulgarian painter Nikolai Pavlovich. In 1855, he had published in Prague in German a work called Slavonic Philosophy (German: Slawische Philosophie). In his seven volumed Panépistème (1861–1867), published in Paris, where the subjects are earth, social sciences, medicine, and philosophy. He claimed that human life developed in Malacca, and that the Slavs were direct descendants of the early humans.

Beron was praised by Bulgarian revolutionaries Georgi Rakovski and Lyuben Karavelov, and the Rusyn scholar Yuriy Venelin. According to literary critic Charles Arthur Moser, some of his books "smack of the at least faintly ridiculous and seem to have been the fruit of an unbalanced intellect".

He supported the theory that the Bulgarians were descended from the Thracians and Illyrians. Beron called himself in his youth a "Thracian", and stated that his place of birth was Thrace.

== Legacy ==
The location of his grave is unknown. His former home in Craiova bears a commemorative plaque, noting that a "Bulgar Patriot" lived there between 1832 and 1871. Beron has been honoured as the first Bulgarian encyclopaedist, a major pedagogical reformer and the first modern Bulgarian philosopher. His two French-language atlases have been preserved by the SS. Cyril and Methodius National Library. Beron Point on Robert Island, South Shetland Islands, Antarctica, is named after him, as is Language School "Dr. Petar Beron" in Kyustendil, Bulgaria.

Beron was portrayed on the obverse of the Bulgarian 10,000 levs banknote issued in 1997 and of the 10 levs banknote issued in 1999 and 2008.
