= Lithuanian encyclopedias =

Books

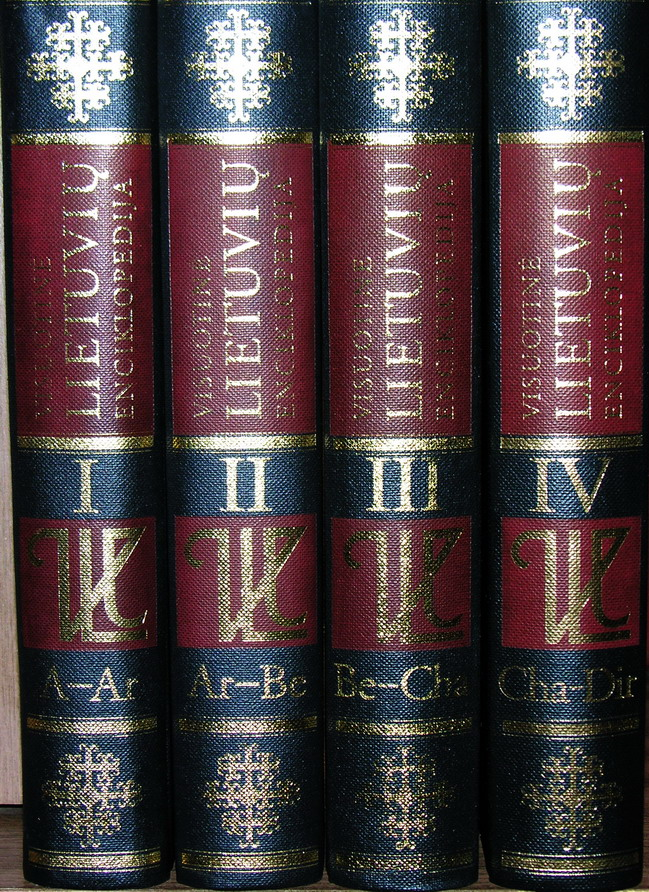
Volumes of the Visuotinė lietuvių enciklopedija

Lithuanian encyclopedias are encyclopedias published in the Lithuanian language or encyclopedias about Lithuania and Lithuania-related topics. The first known attempt to create a Lithuanian encyclopedia was in 1883, when Jonas Jacevičius failed to get permission from the Tsarist authorities for such a publication during the Lithuanian press ban (1866–1904). Several general Lithuanian encyclopedias were published afterwards: one in independent Lithuania in the 1930s (interrupted by World War II and never completed), two in the United States, three in the Lithuanian SSR, and one that was published in 2001–2015 in independent Lithuania. The content of the 25-volume Visuotinė lietuvių enciklopedija or VLE has been made available online.

== Major encyclopedias ==
=== Independent Lithuania (1918–1944) ===
The path to creating the first Lithuanian encyclopedia, Lietuviškoji enciklopedija, was complicated. In 1910, Antanas Olšauskas, a Lithuanian emigrant in Chicago, Illinois, started to assemble an editorial team, but financial constraints and disagreements among the editors resulted in the abandonment of the project in 1912. After the declaration of independence of Lithuania in 1918, two initiatives were born in 1924. One, by the publishing house Švyturys, sought to publish a general encyclopedia; the other, by the publishing house Kultūra, in Šiauliai, sought to publish an encyclopedia dedicated to Lithuania and Lithuania-related topics. However, both initiatives failed due to financial hardships.

In 1929, Spaudos Fondas and Lithuanian Catholic Academy of Sciences separately initiated encyclopedic projects. They finally agreed to cooperate only in 1931, and the first booklet came out on October 1, 1931. Vaclovas Biržiška was appointed editor-in-chief. Many difficulties ensued, but the booklets finally began monthly publication, and approached the status of a periodic scientific journal. Twelve booklets would eventually be combined into one volume. The first volume, containing some 5,000 articles and 700 illustrations, appeared in 1933. Nine volumes were published—up to the letter J—and the tenth was underway when in 1944, the Soviet Union reoccupied Lithuania, and its printing was halted. The encyclopedia was never completed.

=== Encyclopedias published by Lithuanian diaspora ===
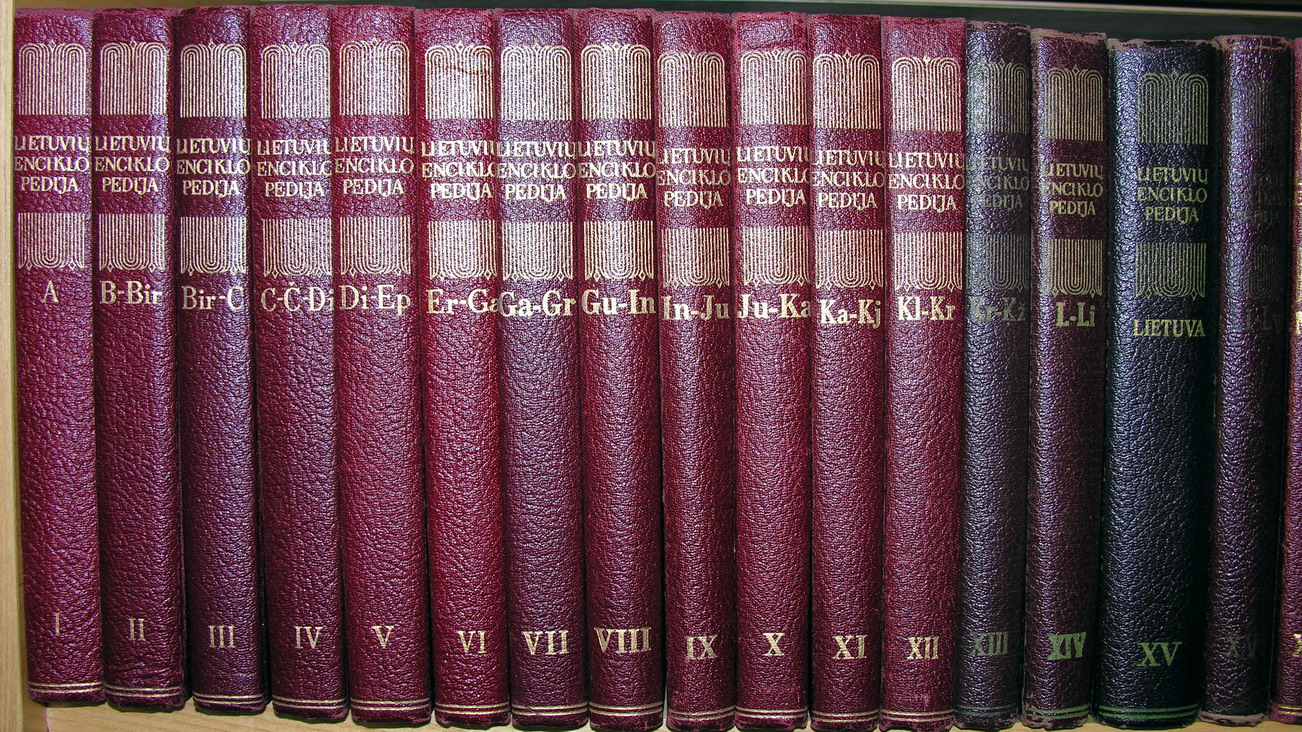
"Boston Encyclopedia" (Lietuvių enciklopedija)

The idea of a Lithuanian encyclopedia was revived in the United States by Lithuanian diaspora. Juozas Kapočius organized the editorial team and Vaclovas Biržiška again became the chief editor. Between 1953 and 1966, they published the 35-volume Lietuvių enciklopedija (often nicknamed the Boston Encyclopedia because it was published in Boston, Massachusetts) in the Lithuanian language. Two volumes of supplements and addenda were published in 1969 and in 1985. It is often believed that they were continuing the unfinished work of their first encyclopedia begun in their homeland. The undertaking was especially difficult because most of their materials and sources were left behind in Lithuania and were now unavailable—a result of the Iron Curtain. Between 1970 and 1978, the same group published the six-volume Encyclopedia Lituanica, an English-language encyclopedia on Lithuania and Lithuania-related topics. It remains the most comprehensive work on Lithuania in English.

=== Soviet Lithuania (1945–1990) ===
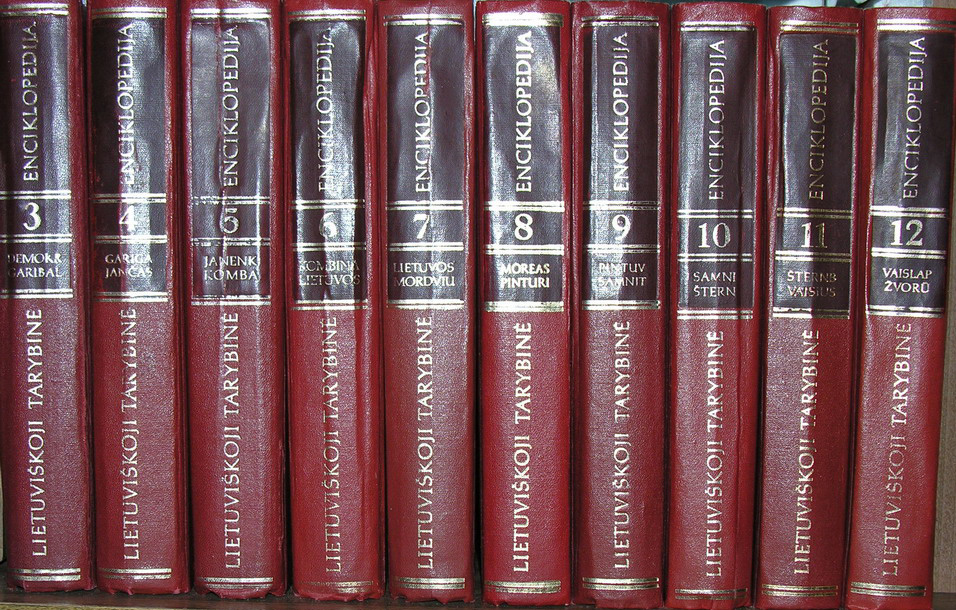
"Red Encyclopedia" – Soviet Lithuanian Encyclopedia (Lietuviškoji tarybinė enciklopedija)

In Lithuania, Soviet authorities printed a three-volume Small Lithuanian Soviet Encyclopedia (Mažoji lietuviškoji tarybinė enciklopedija) between 1966 and 1971; that is, after the Boston Encyclopedia was already completed. It covered only Lithuania-related topics. The 12-volume (plus one volume of supplements) Lietuviškoji tarybinė enciklopedija or LTE was published between 1976 and 1985. It is often called the "Red Encyclopedia" because of its distinct cover colors. It is still valuable for scientific topics, but the social science articles were distorted to conform to Soviet propaganda (for example, it portrayed western countries as bourgeois dictatorships). Much attention was given to Marxism-Leninism and the Communist Party, while many "inconvenient" topics from the Lithuanian history, such as the Lithuanian partisans, were entirely skipped. Between 1985 and 1988, the four-volume Tarybų Lietuvos enciklopedia or TLE, dealing with only Lithuania-related topics, was published. It closely followed the lead of LTE. Its last volume displayed signs of the intellectual freedom that arose in the 1980s during the Glasnost movement in Russia and the Sąjūdis movement in Lithuania.

=== Independent Lithuania (since 1990) ===
In 2001, the Science and Encyclopaedia Publishing Institute, based in Vilnius, began the publication of the 25-volume Visuotinė lietuvių enciklopedija or VLE. The last volume was published in 2014 followed by a volume of supplements in 2015. Each of volume contains about 800 pages. In total, the encyclopedia contains 121,804 articles written by 2,957 authors, 25,120 illustrations, and 656 maps. About 21% of the articles is devoted to Lithuanian matters, particularly to those that were censored and repressed during the Soviet era. In 2017, the content of the encyclopedia was made available online.

== See also ==
- Lithuanian dictionaries
