= Mažoji lietuviškoji tarybinė enciklopedija =

Lithuanian-language Soviet encyclopedia

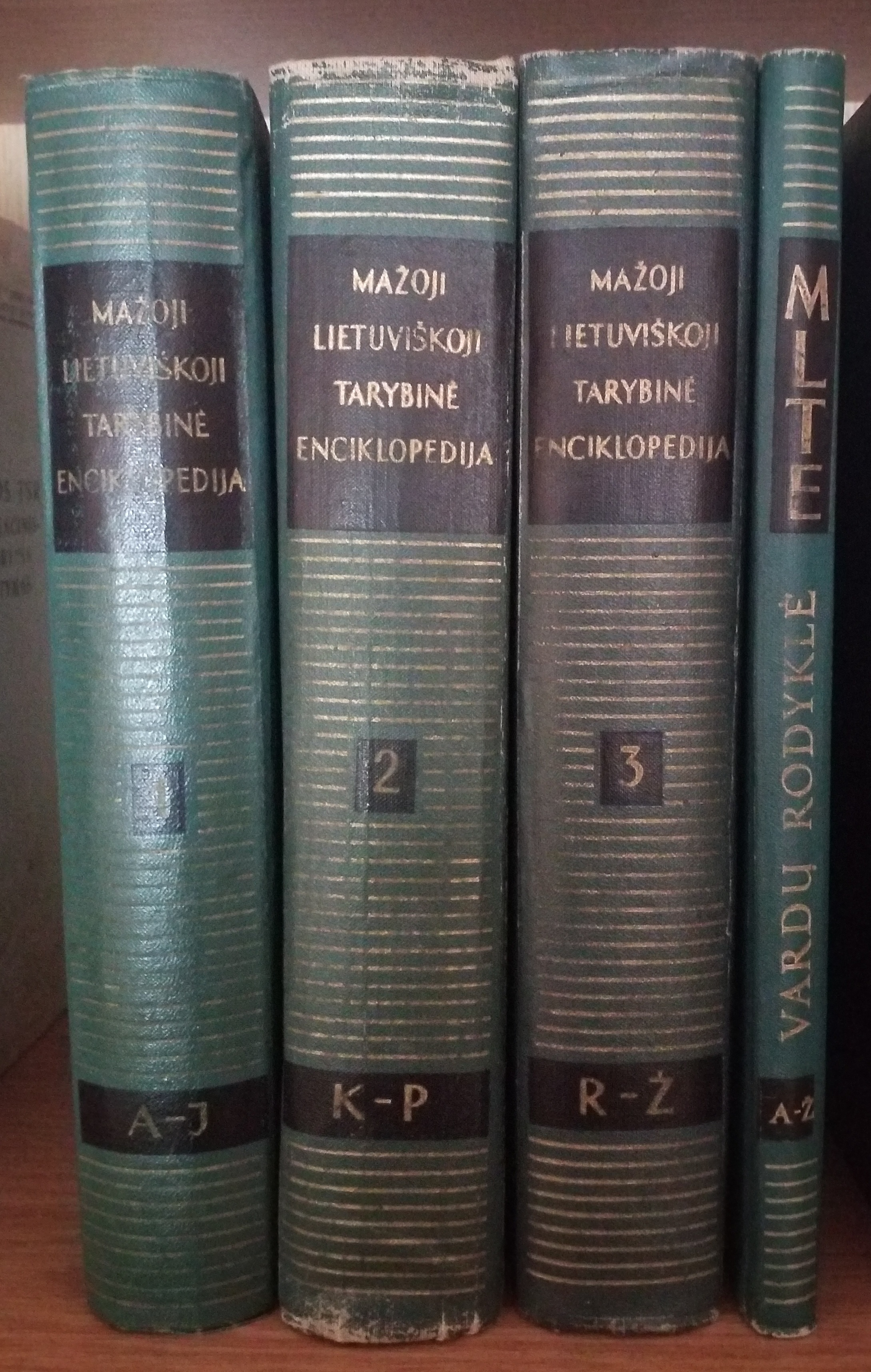
- The three volumes of the encyclopedia
- Author: Various
- Language: Lithuanian
- Publication date: 1966–1971
- Publication place: Lithuanian Soviet Socialist Republic
- Followed by: Abėcėlinė vardų rodyklė

The Mažoji lietuviškoji tarybinė enciklopedija (abbreviated as MLTE) (Note: Russian: Малая литовская советская энциклопедия, romanized: Malaya litovskaya sovetskaya entsiklopediya) is a three-volume encyclopedia that was published and distributed in the Lithuanian Soviet Socialist Republic between 1966 and 1971. There is no official translation, but the title roughly translates as the "Small Lithuanian Soviet Encyclopedia".

== History ==
The encyclopedia was the first to be published in Soviet Lithuania, with three volumes being published between 1966 and 1971.

It was written by a small editorial team and approved by the "Mažosios lietuviškosios tarybinės enciklopedijos redakcija" (transl. Editorial Board of the Small Lithuanian Soviet Encyclopedia), which was known as the Vyriausioji enciklopedijų redakcija as of 1970, with the editor-in-chief being Lithuanian scientist Juozas Matulis.

The text was printed in Vilnius by the Mintis publishing house. Approximately 30,000 copies were sold between 1966 and 1971.

In 1975, a fourth volume, acting as an index to the MLTE, was published four years after official printing ceased, named the "Abėcėlinė vardų rodyklė" (transl. Alphabetical Index of Names).

An official 12-volume encyclopedia followed the MLTE, titled the Lietuviškoji tarybinė enciklopedija (LTE), covering a much wider range of similar topics, such as the sciences and social sciences, between 1976 and 1985. However, much of the text was regulated under even stricter Soviet propaganda than the MLTE and often "distorted" its content. It contained a total of 72,100 articles, 20,400 illustrations, and 800 maps. It was approved under the same board, but directed under Antanas Račis.

== Volumes and content ==
The texts contain a total of 555 issues, 18,900 articles, and approximately 4,000 illustrations. It specifically records information on Lithuania's nature, culture, society, history, and humanitarian studies. However, some of the information, which would otherwise be patriotist, had been altered by the Soviet government to condemn support for Lithuanian culture.

Four published books: 3 volumes and 1 index
Year	Volume number	Range	Number of pages
1966	Vol. 1	A–J	735
1968	Vol. 2	K–P	958
1971	Vol. 3	R–Ž	953
1975	Alphabetical Index of Names		222
