= Radulfus Ardens =

French theologian and early scholastic philosopher

Radulfus Ardens (Raoul Ardent; died c. 1200) was a French theologian and early scholastic philosopher of the 12th century. He was born in Beaulieu, Poitou.

He is known for his Summa de vitiis et virtutibus (summary of vices and virtues), also called Speculum universale (universal mirror). It is a systematic work in 14 volumes covering theology and ethics.

In his time, he was celebrated as a preacher, and a large number of his sermons survive. He was under the influence of Gilbert de la Porrée. He is thought to have been a student of Peter the Chanter.

He served as a chaplain to Richard I of England, through most of the 1190s.
