= Primer with Various Instructions =

Book by Petar Beron

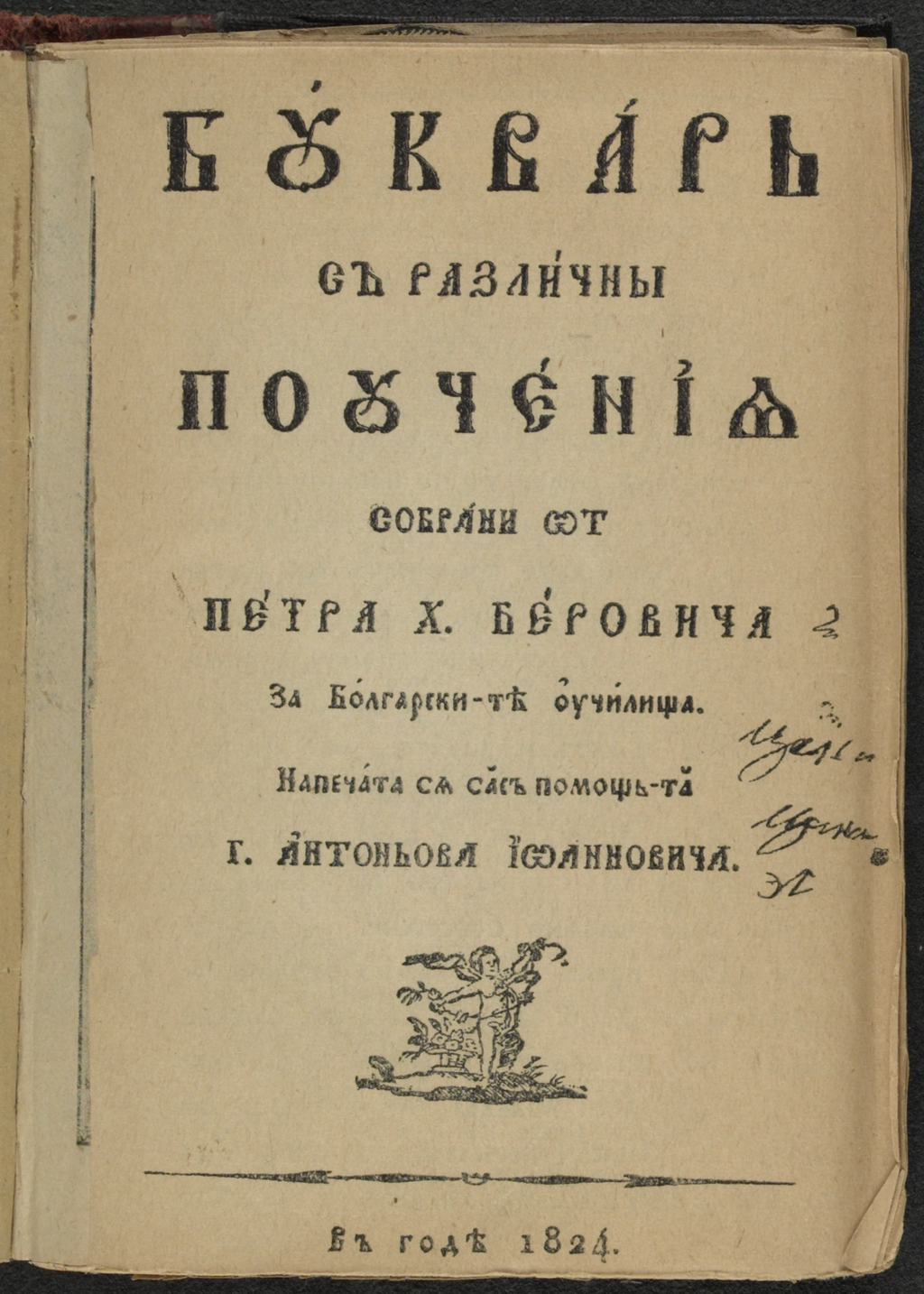
- Title page of the first edition
- Author: Petar Beron
- Original title: БȢква̀рь съ разлѝчны поȢчѐніѧ
- Language: Bulgarian
- Subject: Language, fables and religious tales, natural sciences
- Genre: encyclopedia
- Publication date: 1824
- Publication place: Brașov, Austrian Empire
- Media type: book
- Pages: 140

Primer with Various Instructions (Bulgarian: Буквар с различни поучения, original spelling: БȢква̀рь съ разлѝчны поȢчѐніѧ, Bukvar s razlichni poucheniya), better known as the Fish Primer (Bulgarian: Рибен буквар, Riben bukvar), was a Bulgarian schoolbook, the first primer (and first book) printed in modern Bulgarian. It is considered to be the first Bulgarian encyclopedia.

The book was written and published by Petar Beron in 1824. It was printed in First Romanian School in Brașov, at that time in Austrian Empire, today in Romania.

The book is one of the most significant secular works of the Bulgarian National Revival. It was the first secular publication in modern Bulgaria.

== Background ==
The primer was a result of the increasing number of secular schools appearing in Ottoman Bulgaria, as well as Beron's own impressions of Western European systems of education. Until the late 18th century, most schools in Bulgaria were attached to monasteries (so-called "Cell schools") and the curriculum virtually consisted of only a Book of Hours, a psalter and the Bible. Students received their education in Old Church Slavonic or Greek, both of which were difficult to understand for those outside the clergy. Beron was aware that this type of education was inefficient, and modeled his ideas for the new Bulgarian schools along the monitorial system and education in natural sciences. The primer was designed as a children's encyclopedia. It was published in the Transylvanian city of Kronstadt in the Austrian Empire (now Brașov, Romania).

== Description ==
The primer consists of ten sections: Foreword, Primer, Prayers, Good advice, Smart responses, Fables, Various stories, Physical tales and Arithmetic. All sections from Primer to Smart responses contain basic knowledge on language, religion and rhetoric; Fables includes most of Aesop's eponymous works, and the remaining sections are a collection of famous events from ancient history, studies on plants and animals and mathematical science. Some of the animals are illustrated in a compendium section. The primer earned its nickname, Fish Primer, since one of these illustrations, a whale, appeared on the back of the original edition. The nickname, however, was erroneous, since whales are mammals, not fish.

The book had an enormous impact on the National Revival and played a key role in laying the foundations of a modern, secular Bulgarian education.
