= Tietosanakirja =

Finnish 11-volume encyclopedia

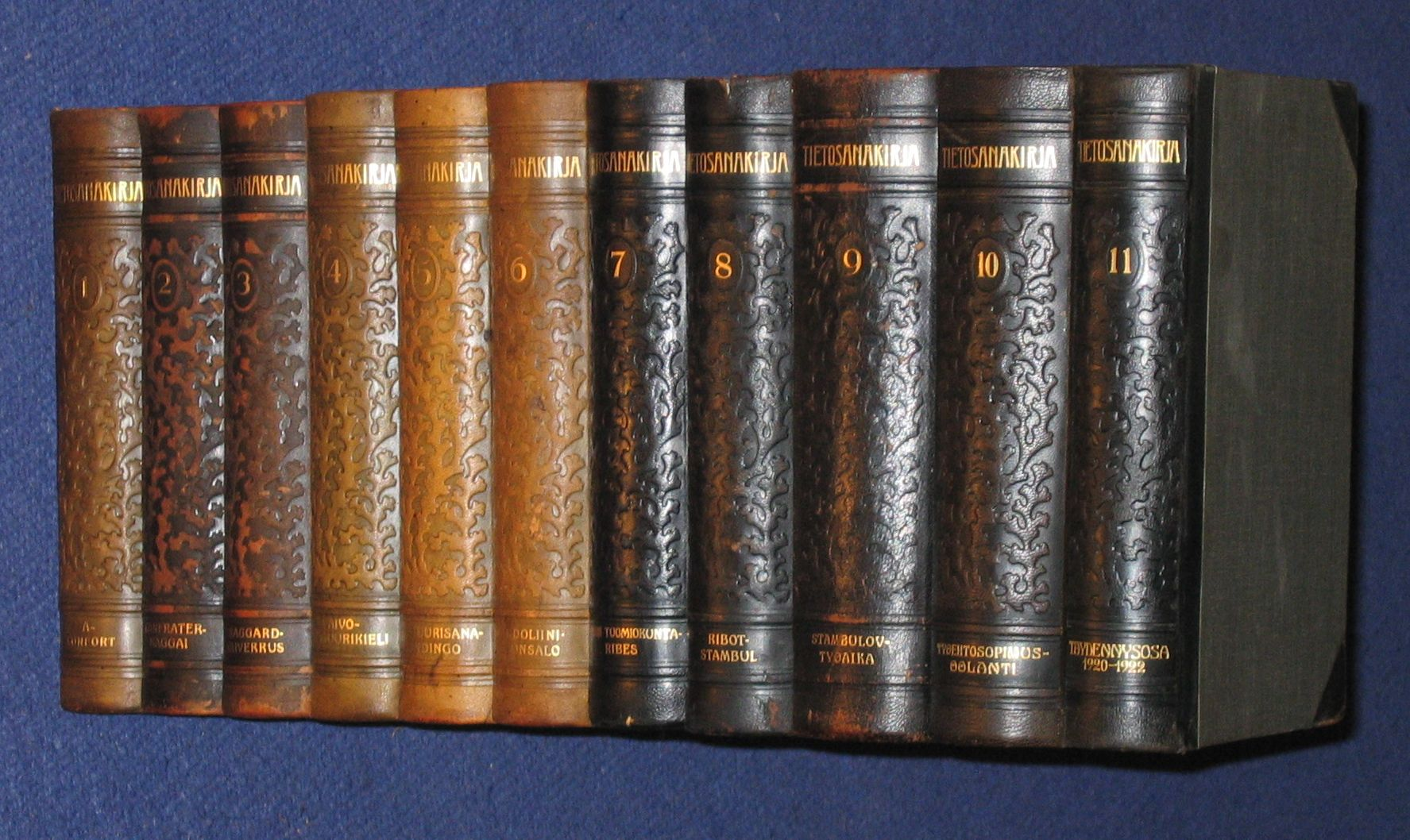
The full eleven-book set, with ten regular volumes and one supplementary volume

The Tietosanakirja ("Encyclopedia", lit. "knowledge word-book", "knowledge dictionary"), published in 11 volumes from 1909 to 1922, was the first Finnish language encyclopedia. It was published by Tietosanakirja-Osakeyhtiö, a joint effort between Otava and WSOY. The name of the series was adopted into the Finnish language to mean all encyclopedias, so to differentiate, the series became colloquially known as Iso musta tietosanakirja ("the Big Black Encyclopedia").

It was followed by the abridged Pieni tietosanakirja, "Small Encyclopedia", published in 4 volumes, 1925–1928.

== List of volumes ==
- Tietosanakirja. 1. osa, A–Confort. Helsinki: Tietosanakirja. 1909.
- Tietosanakirja. 2. osa, Confrater–Haggai. Helsinki: Tietosanakirja. 1910.
- Tietosanakirja. 3. osa, Haggard–Kaiverrus. Helsinki: Tietosanakirja. 1911.
- Tietosanakirja. 4. osa, Kaivo–Kulttuurikieli. Helsinki: Tietosanakirja. 1912.
- Tietosanakirja. 5. osa, Kulttuurisana–Mandingo. Helsinki: Tietosanakirja. 1913.
- Tietosanakirja. 6. osa, Mandolini–Oulunsalo. Helsinki: Tietosanakirja. 1914.
- Tietosanakirja. 7. osa, Oulun tuomiokunta–Ribes. Helsinki: Tietosanakirja. 1915.
- Tietosanakirja. 8. osa, Ribot–Stambul. Helsinki: Tietosanakirja. 1916.
- Tietosanakirja. 9. osa, Stambulov–Työaika. Helsinki: Tietosanakirja. 1917.
- Tietosanakirja. 10. osa, Työehtosopimus–Öölanti. Helsinki: Tietosanakirja. 1919.
- Tietosanakirja. 11. osa, Täydennysosa 1920–1922. Helsinki: Tietosanakirja. 1921–22.
