= Tarybų Lietuvos enciklopedija =

Lithuanian encyclopedia

Soviet Lithuanian Encyclopedia
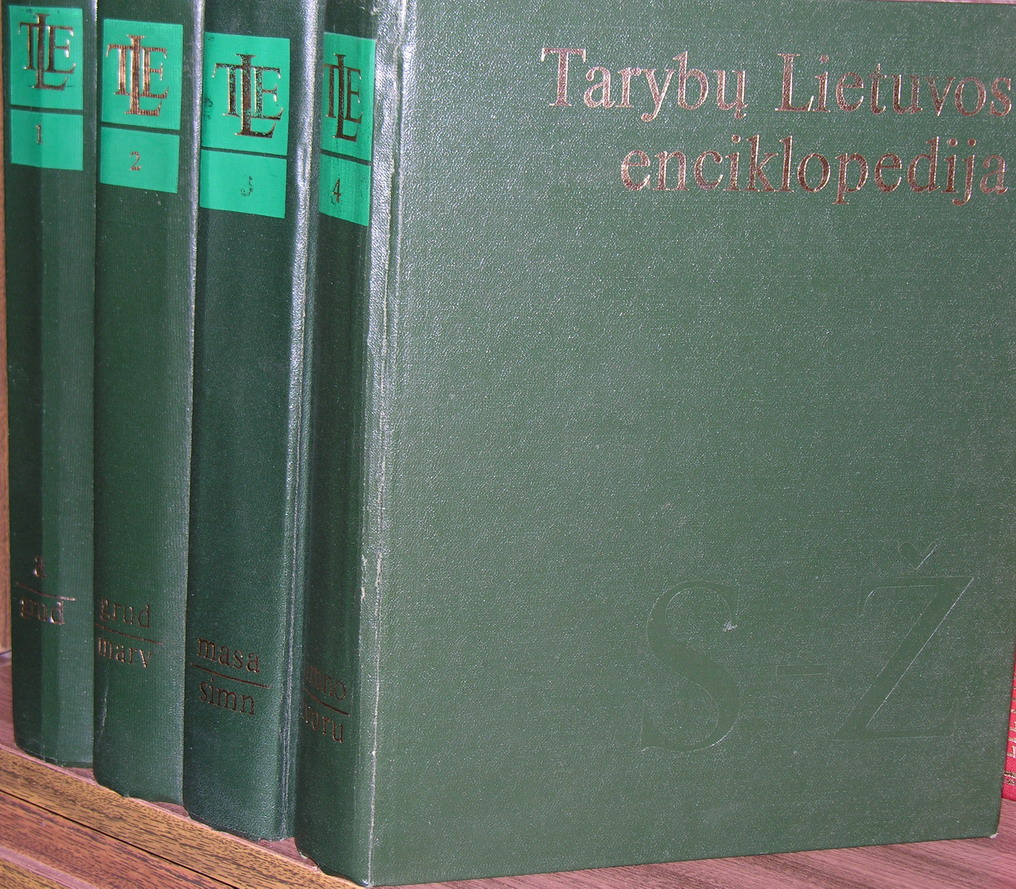
- Four volumes of Tarybų Lietuvos enciklopedija
- Language: Lithuanian
- Subject: General
- Genre: Reference encyclopaedia
- Publication place: Lithuanian SSR, USSR
- OCLC: 20017802

Tarybų Lietuvos enciklopedija or TLE (translation: Encyclopedia of Soviet Lithuania) was an encyclopedia of the Lithuanian SSR, covering topics such as archaeology, history, nature, science, cultural heritage, cities, districts, biographies of famous people and politics, but only as they relate to Lithuania. It was published in four volumes between 1985 and 1988 in Vilnius. It was derived from the 12-volume Lietuviškoji tarybinė enciklopedija but TLE did not cover general areas such as technology, biology, pharmacology, chemistry, medicine, mathematics and others.

== Volumes ==
- Volume 1: A–Grūdas, 1985
- Volume 2: Grūdas–Marvelis, 1986
- Volume 3: Masaitis–Simno, 1987
- Volume 4: Simno–Žvorūnė, 1988
