= Larousse =

Larousse can refer to:

- Éditions Larousse, a French publishing house founded by Pierre Larousse
  - some of its publications
    - Grand Larousse encyclopédique, 1960–1964 encyclopedia
    - Larousse Gastronomique
    - Petit Larousse (1905)
    - Grand dictionnaire universel du XIXe siècle, 1866–1876 encyclopedia, the first Larousse
    - Nouveau Larousse illustré, 1897–1904 encyclopedia
    - Grand Dictionnaire Encyclopédique Larousse, 1982–1985 dictionary and encyclopedia
- Pierre Larousse (1817–1875), French grammarian, lexicographer, encyclopedist

== See also ==
- Professor Larousse (1920 film), silent German crime drama
- Larrousse, former F1 team
- Gérard Larrousse (born 1940), French motorsports figure
- Rousse, Bulgaria
- Rousses, France; a commune in Lozère
- La Rousse, Monaco; the northernmost ward of Monaco
- Les Rousses, France; a commune in Bourgogne-Franche-Comté
