= List of encyclopedias in French =

This is a list of encyclopedias in the French language.

Printed (paper)
Digital (online)
Both*

*This usually means that volumes of the encyclopaedia were originally printed on paper, but at some point (usually in the 1990s or early 2000s), the encyclopaedia has been digitised and made available in whole or in part in electronic form (usually online, but not necessarily). New entries may or may not be added, while old entries (originally printed) may or may not be updated. Usually, publication of paper-printed editions has been discontinued.

Title in French	Title in English	Published
L'Encyclopédie canadienne	The Canadian Encyclopedia	1985–present
Dictionnaire du monde religieux dans la France contemporaine	Dictionary of the Religious World in Contemporary France	1985–present
Dictionnaire universel	Universal Dictionary	1690–1727
Encyclopédie de la Vie (Note: Available online in 19 languages, one of which is French.)	Encyclopedia of Life	2008–present
Encyclopédie (d'Yverdon), ou Dictionnaire universel raisonné des connaissances humaines	Encyclopedia (of Yverdon), or Reasoned; Universal Dictionary of Human Knowledge	1770–1780
Encyclopédie	Encyclopaedia	1751–1772
Discours préliminaire de l'Encyclopédie	Preliminary Discourse to Diderot's Encyclopedia	1751
Encyclopédie berbère	Berber Encyclopaedia	1984–present
Encyclopédie de la Pléiade	Pléiade Encyclopaedia	1956–1991
Encyclopédie française	French Encyclopaedia	1935–1966
Encyclopédie Méthodique	Methodical Encyclopaedia	1782–1832
Focus (Note: Originally written in Swedish, later translated to Danish, Norwegian, French, Portuguese, and Spanish.)	Focus	1958–1960
Grand Dictionnaire Encyclopédique Larousse	Great Larousse Encyclopedic Dictionary	1982–1985
Grand dictionnaire universel du XIXe siècle	Great Universal Dictionary of the 19th Century	1866–1890
Grand Larousse encyclopédique	Great Larousse Encyclopaedia	1960–1975 (print); 2008–present (online)
La Grande Encyclopédie	The Great Encyclopaedia	1886–1902
Histoire des deux Indes	History of the Two Indies	1770
Histoire Naturelle	Natural History	1749–1804
Dictionnaire historique de la Suisse (Note: Published in German, French, Italian, and an abridged edition in Romansh.)	Historical Dictionary of Switzerland	1998–present
Le Japon: Dictionnaire et Civilisation	Japan Encyclopedia	1996, 2002 (Note: Originally published in French in 1996. Translated into and published in English as Japan Encyclopedia in 2002.)
Larousse Gastronomique	Larousse Gastronomique: The World's; Greatest Culinary Encyclopedia	1938–2017 (Note: Originally published in French in 1938. New editions and (English) translations have so far appeared until 2017.)
Le Grand Dictionnaire historique (Note: The Grand Dictionnaire historique was also translated and adapted into English, German, Dutch, and Spanish.)	The Great Historical Dictionary	1674–1759
Les Marges du christianisme	The Margins of Christianity	2001
Nouveau Larousse illustré	New Illustrated Larousse	1897–1904
Encyclopédie nouvelle	New Encyclopaedia	1834–1847
Orbis Pictus (Note: Originally published in Latin in 1658. Best known for its 1666 quadrilingual edition in Latin, German, Italian and French. Many other editions and translations were published.)	Orbis Pictus	1658–1780
Le Petit Larousse	The Little Larousse	1905–present
Quid	Quid	1963–2007 (print); 1997–2010 (online)
Suites à Buffon	Sequels to Buffon	1834–1890
Tableau encyclopédique et méthodique	Encyclopedic and Methodical Table	1791–1823
Wikipedia en français	French Wikipedia	2001–present
