= Auge (disambiguation) =

Auge was the daughter of Aleus and mother of the hero Telephus in Greek Mythology.

Auge or Augé may also refer to:

== People ==
- Augé (surname)
- Auge, a Greek goddess, one of the Horae or hours in Greek time measurement
- Auge, nickname for German footballer Klaus Augenthaler

== Places ==
- Auge, Ardennes, France
- Auge, Creuse, France
- Augé, Deux-Sèvres, France
- Auge-Saint-Médard, in the Charente département, France
- the Pays d'Auge, an area of France

== Other ==
- Augé (automobile), an early French automobile

== See also ==
- Augen (disambiguation)
