= Éditions Larousse =

French publishing house

- « Je sème à tout vent. »
- Parent company: Hachette; Lagardère
- Founded: 1852; 174 years ago
- Founder: Pierre Larousse
- Country of origin: France
- Headquarters location: Paris
- Key people: Isabelle Jeuge-Maynart (CEO)
- Official website: larousse.fr

Éditions Larousse (French pronunciation: [edisjɔ̃ laʁus]) is a French publishing house specialising in reference works such as dictionaries. It was founded by Pierre Larousse, and for some time was known also as Librairie Larousse; its best-known work is the Petit Larousse single-volume quarto dictionary.

It was acquired from private owners by Compagnie Européenne de Publication in 1984, then by Havas in 1997. It was acquired by Vivendi Universal in 1998. Vivendi made losses in 2002 and sold Larousse to the Lagardère Group, thus satisfying public opinion by keeping Larousse in French hands, despite objections by smaller publishers about Lagardère's virtual monopoly on French publishing. It has been a subsidiary of Hachette Livre since 2004.

It also offered the Larousse Gastronomique and a free, open-content encyclopedia.

The logo was designed by, among others, Jean Picart Le Doux (1955–1970), Jean-Michel Folon (1972), Philippe Starck (2006), Christian Lacroix, Moebius, Karl Lagerfeld (1999), and Jean-Charles de Castelbajac (2014). It always represented a woman blowing on a dandelion blowball, with the motto "Je sème à tout vent" (I sow to every wind).

== History ==
=== The founder: Pierre Larousse ===
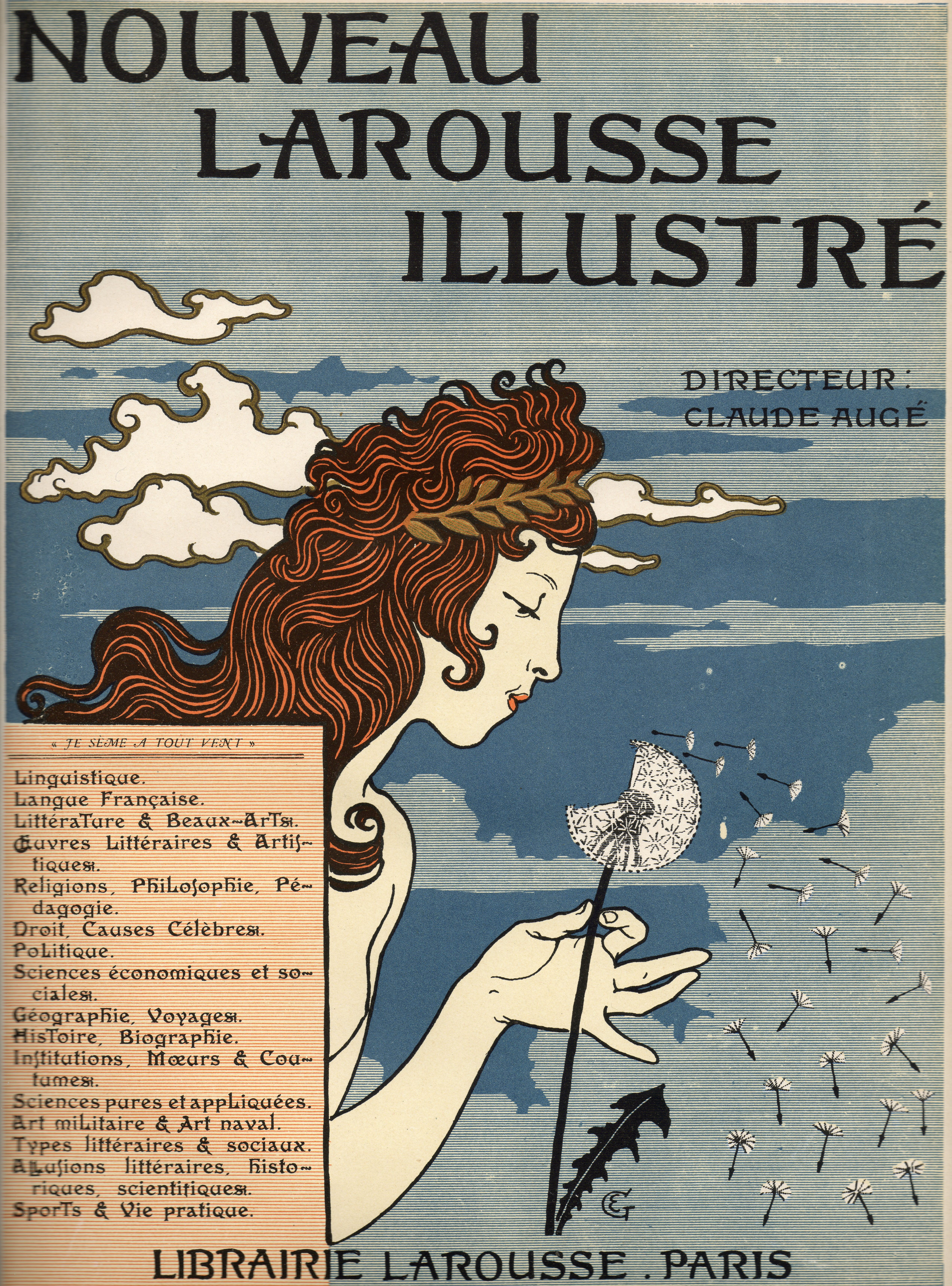
1897–1904 edition, directed by Claude Augé, designed by Eugène Grasset.

The Larousse publishing house, founded in 1852, took off in the mid-19th century. Its history is linked to that of its founder, Pierre Larousse (1817–1875), who, in 1852, with his associate Pierre-Augustin Boyer (1821–1896), also a teacher, opened a bookstore in their names in the Latin Quarter: Maison Larousse & Boyer. The goal of these two anticlerical republicans was to write renewed textbooks for primary and secondary education, similar to those offered by Louis Hachette since 1833.

The two Burgundian teachers (Pierre Larousse having more of a creator role and Augustin Boyer that of a salesman) rented a small premises at 2 rue Pierre-Sarrazin, then moved in 1856 to 49 rue Saint-André-des-Arts.

In 1856, Pierre Larousse published, with the help of François Pillon, the Nouveau Dictionnaire de la langue française, ancestor of the Petit Larousse. Subsequently, for nearly twenty-five years, he launched in 1863, in the form of fascicles, the Grand Dictionnaire géographique, mythologique, bibliographique, littéraire, artistique, scientifique du 19th century, which would become the Grand Dictionnaire universel du XIXe siècle (published from 1866 to 1877) in 15 volumes (20,800 pages). In the meantime, in 1869, Pierre separated from Boyer (the two families would reunite in 1889), took back the capital he had accumulated thanks to the profits of the house, and set himself up as author-publisher at 19, rue du Montparnasse and, as printer, thanks to a printing house, he rented rue Notre-Dame-des-Champs. He died at 57, exhausted by his work (he had already had a small stroke in 1868). His wife, Suzanne, created the company "V^{ve} P. Larousse et C^{ie"} with her nephew, Jules Hollier-Larousse (1842–1909).

As Pierre Larousse had no children, the continuators of the Librairie Larousse were Émile Moreau (1842–1919) and his brother Georges Moreau (1853–1934), Paul Gillon, and Claude Augé; the latter had entered as an assistant accountant in the house.

Georges Moreau, associate of Pierre Larousse, became a director of the Librairie Larousse in 1885. He founded in 1891 the Revue encyclopédique, which became in 1901 the Revue universelle.

=== The successor: Claude Augé ===
Plates of costumes from the Nouveau Larousse illustré

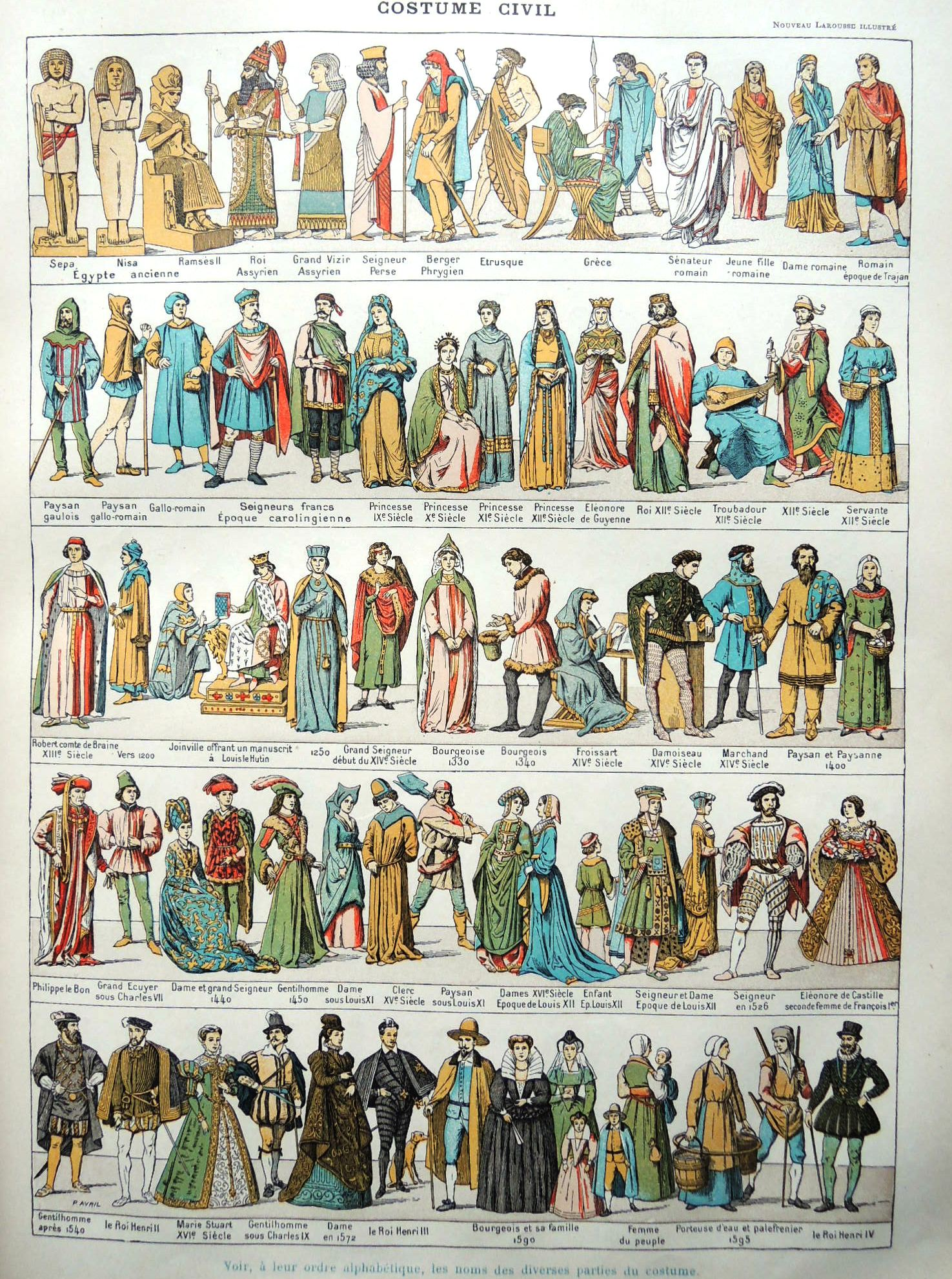
Civil costumes, first plate.

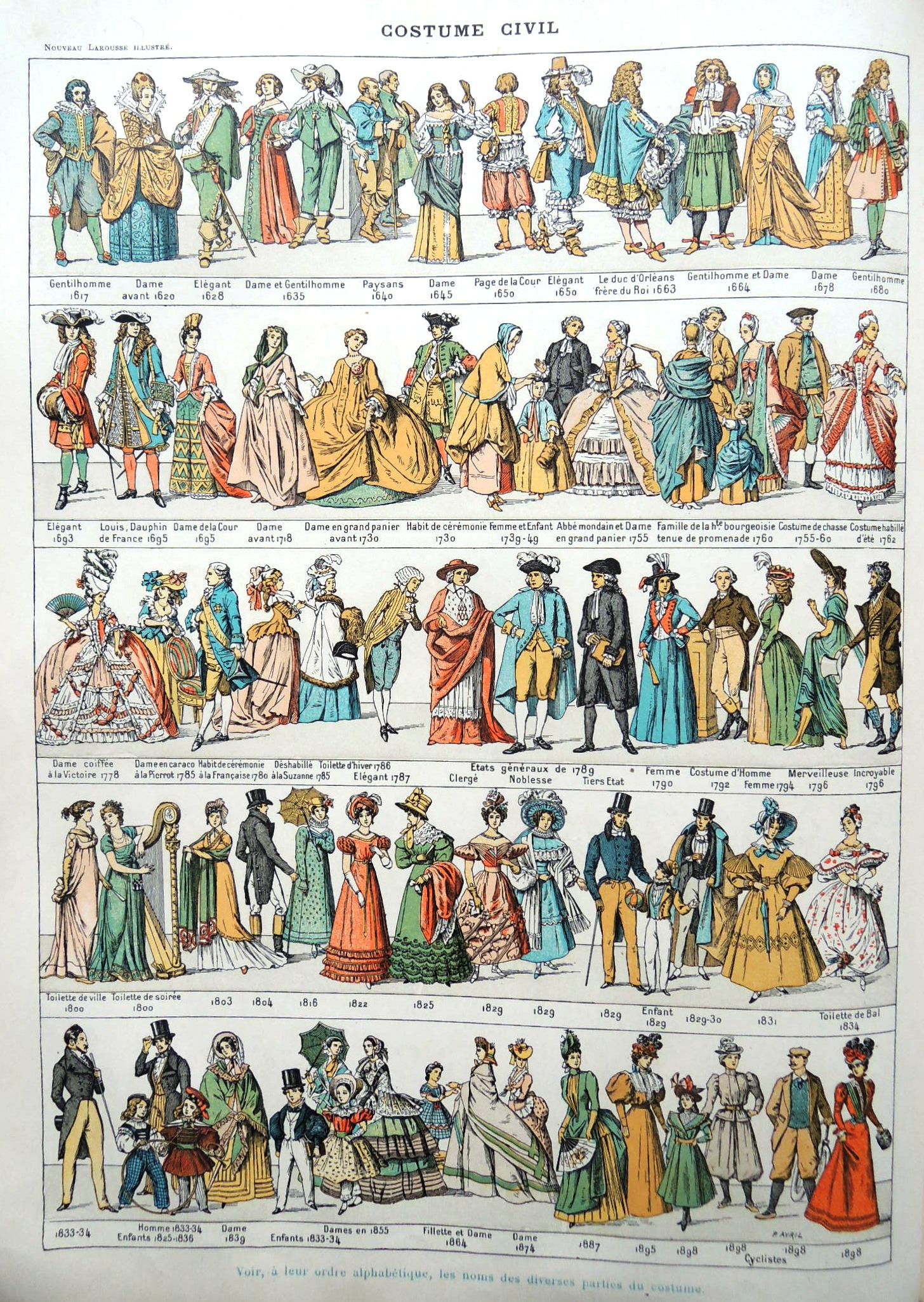
Civil costumes, second plate.

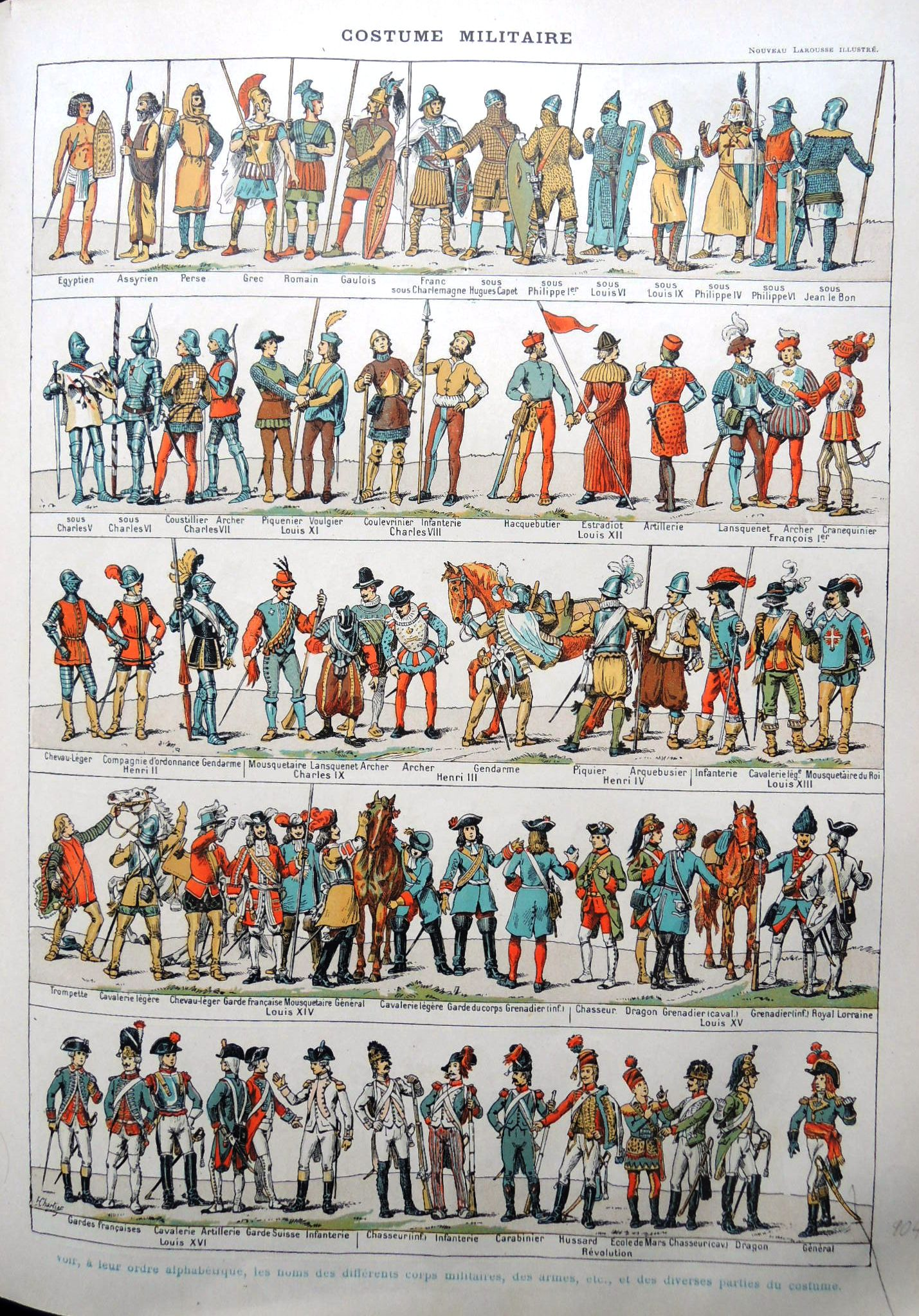
Military costumes, first plate.

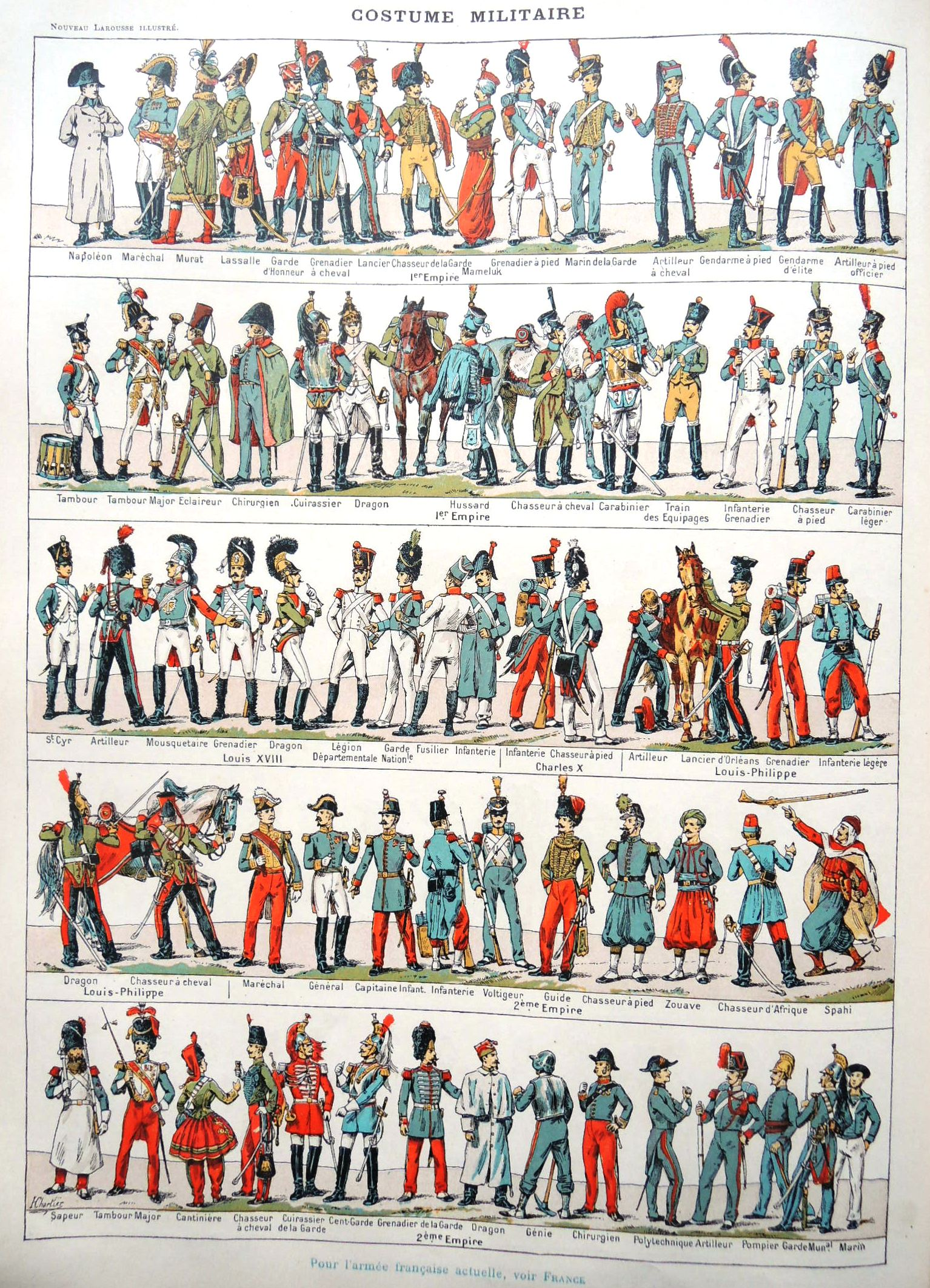
Military costumes, second plate.

The "Semeuse generation" (1895–1920) continued the work of the encyclopedist. Claude Augé developed products that became references. The Nouveau Larousse illustré (1897–1904), a true masterpiece of French publishing in seven large volumes (and a supplement in 1907), mobilized more than 150 collaborators and counts 237,000 articles spread over 7,600 pages. These pages are illustrated with 49,000 engravings, 504 maps, and 89 color plates. This work is a commercial success, with sales of more than 250,000 copies in thirty years.

Nouveau Larousse illustré (1897–1904)

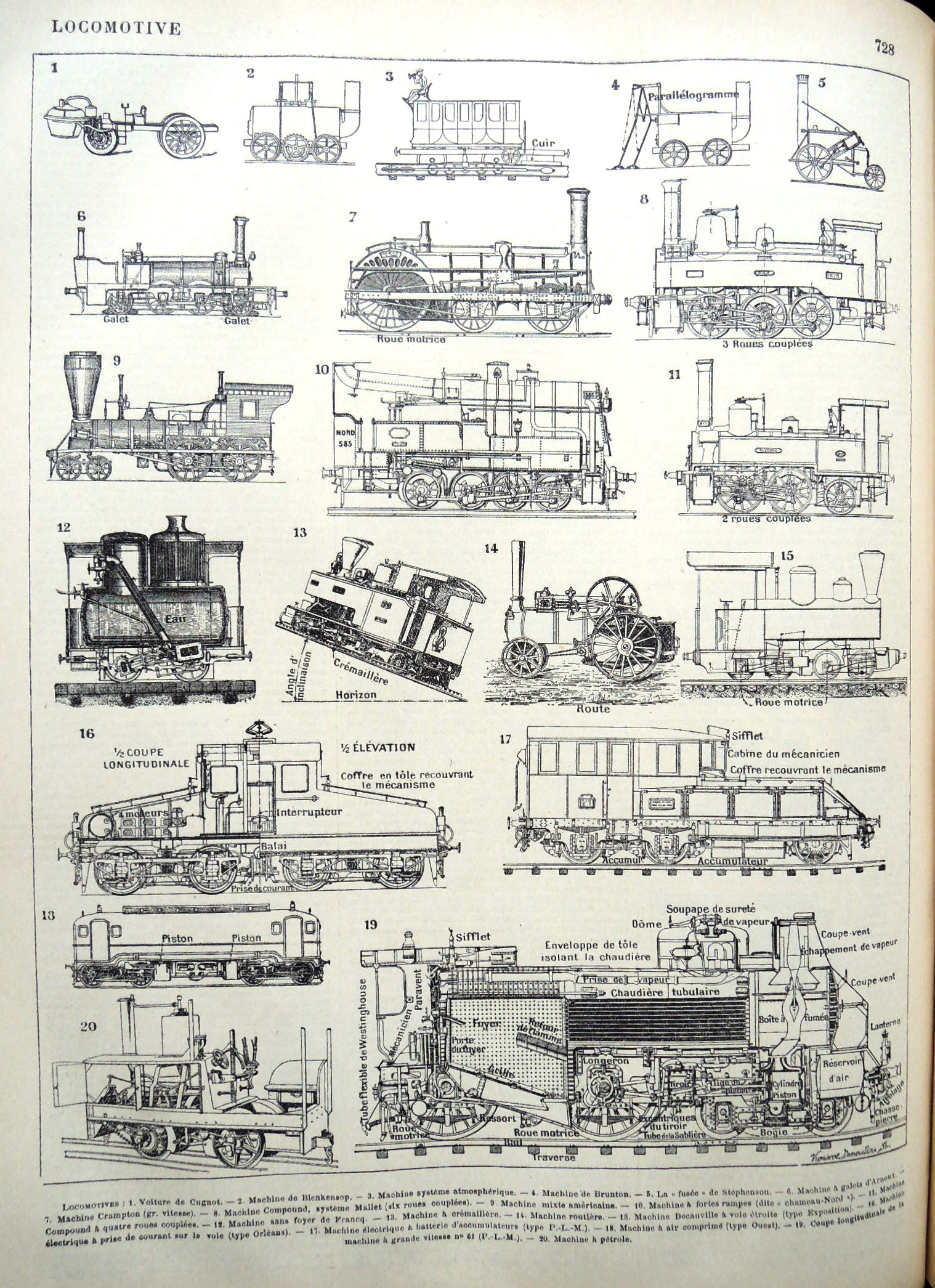
Plate of locomotives.

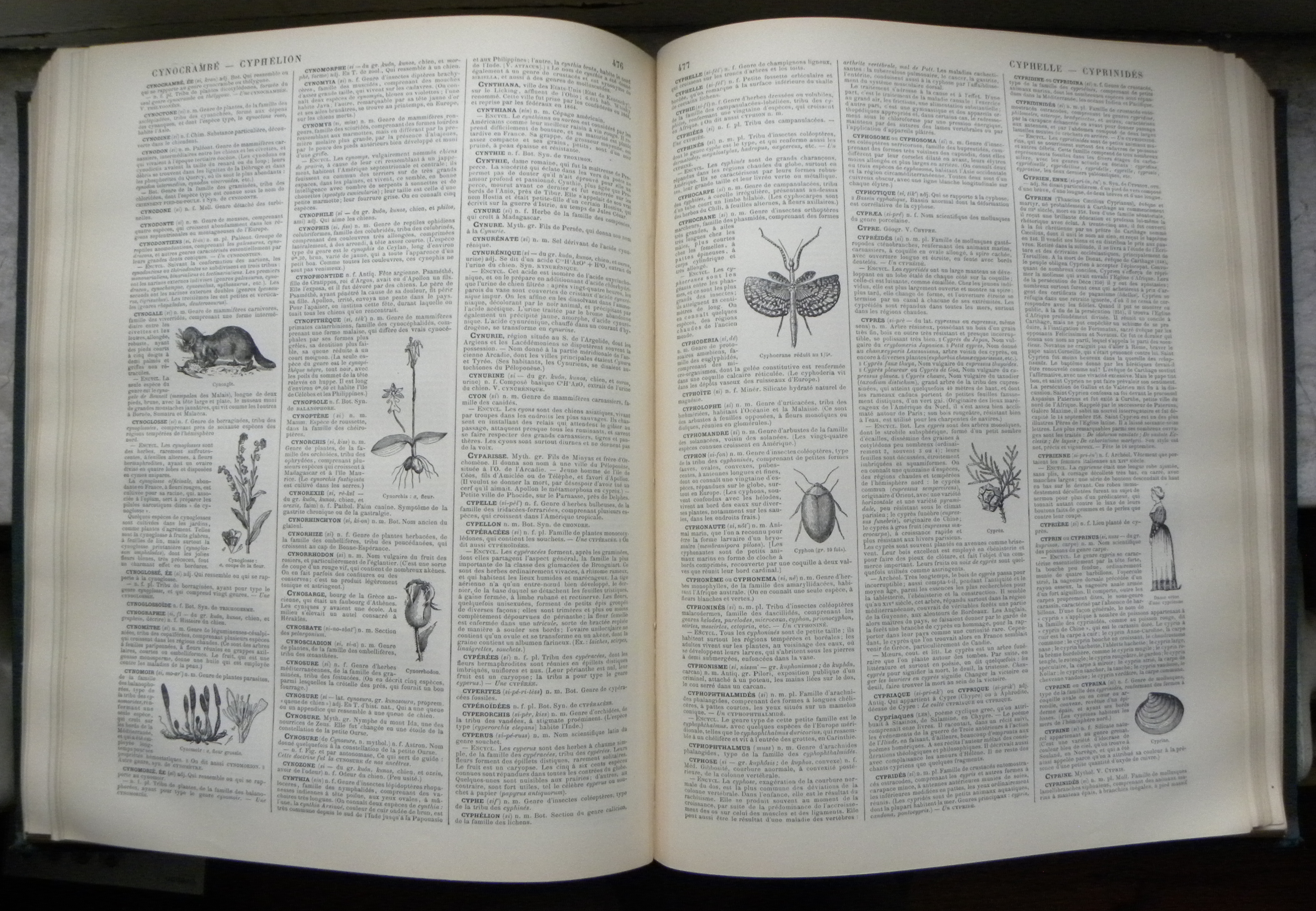
Organization of articles.

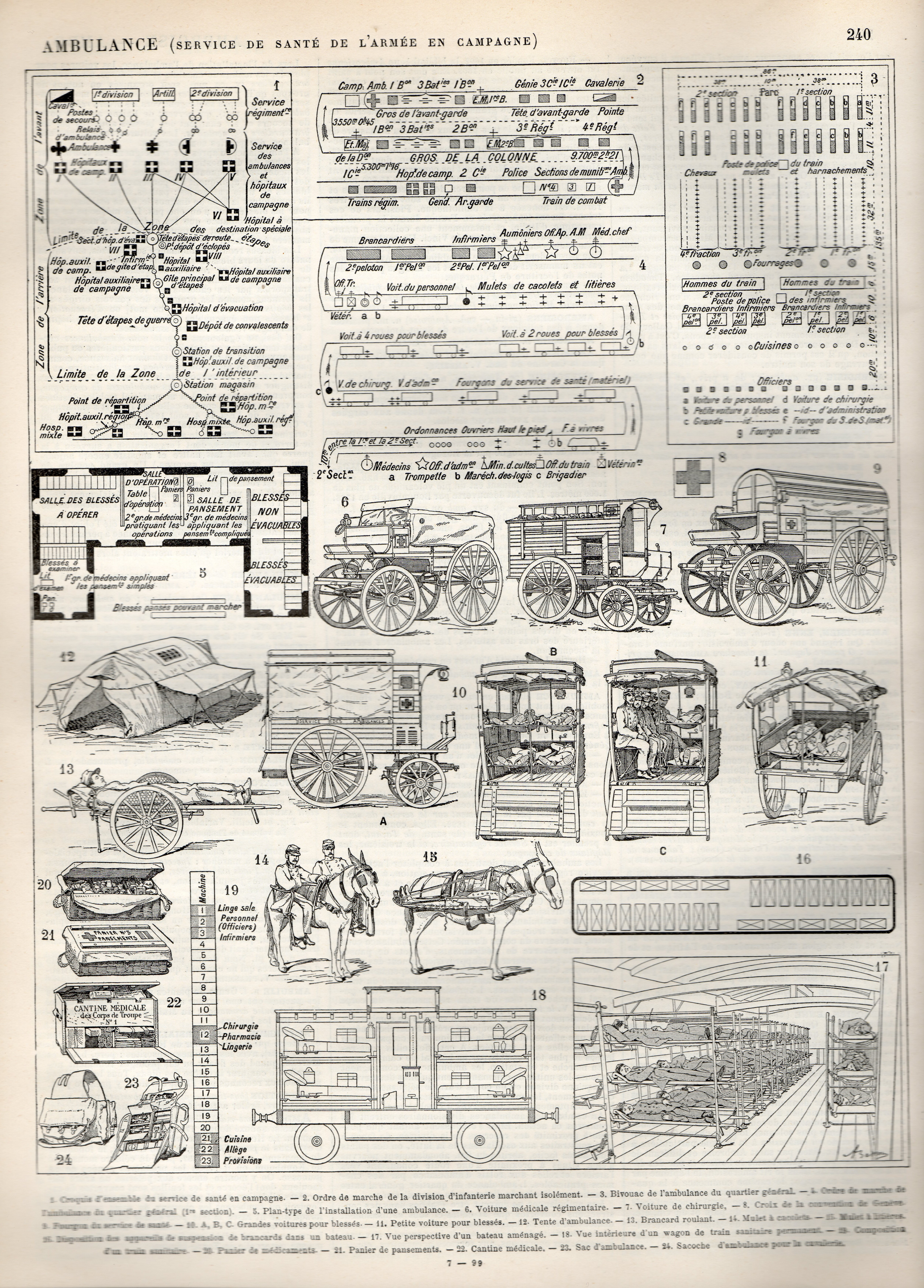
Plate on military ambulances.

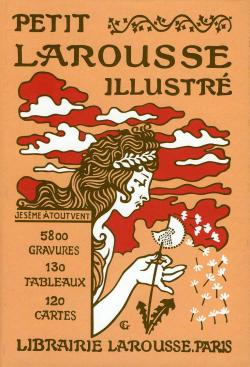
1905 edition.

This encyclopedia served as the basis for the design of the Petit Larousse (1st edition: 1905) which is sought today among others for its cover signed Eugène Grasset. The house invented the slogan for the Petit Larousse: "Often imitated but never equaled".

In 1906, the first edition of the Petit Larousse illustré inaugurated the tripartite division that would make the mark of this work: language dictionary, pink pages of Latin and foreign phrases, dictionary of proper names. Direct descendant of the Dictionnaire (1856) of Pierre Larousse, it would become in 1924 Le Nouveau Petit Larousse and would know multiple editions.

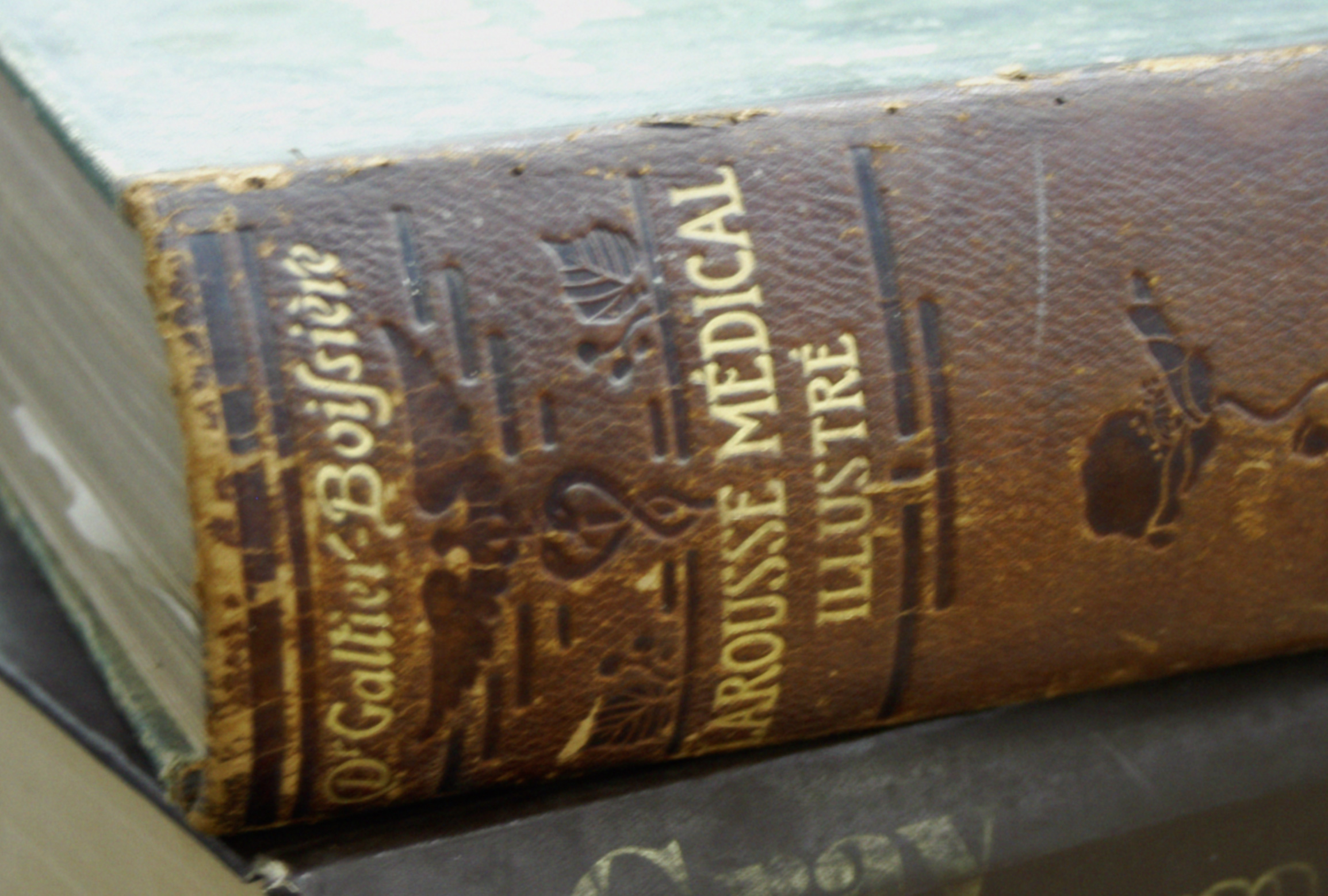
Back of the Larousse médical illustré (1912).

In 1907, the publication of the Larousse mensuel illustré, subtitled Revue mensuelle encyclopédique, was richly illustrated and lasted until 1957.

In 1912, the first Larousse médical was published under the direction of doctor Émile-Marie Galtier-Boissière. After numerous reprints and several reworkings, the work is still being marketed a hundred years later. The same year, Le Petit Larousse was adapted into Spanish by Miguel de Toro y Gisbert under the title Pequeño Larousse ilustrado. Other editions would follow under the title Nuevo Pequeño Larousse ilustrado. This makes Larousse one of the rare dictionary publishers that succeeded in publishing in a language other than the original. Successor to the Larousse pour tous (two volumes: volume 1 in 1907 and volume 2 in 1908), the Larousse universel, an encyclopedic dictionary in two volumes, appeared in 1922.

=== From the 1920s to the 1960s ===
In 1926, appeared in 1 volume the first Larousse ménager. This work, comprising about 3000 articles, relates to good housekeeping practices in the broad sense of the housewife at that time.

From 1928 to 1933, Paul Augé, son of Claude, coordinated the Larousse du XXe siècle, a universal encyclopedic dictionary in six volumes and printed in heliogravure. It gradually succeeded the Nouveau Larousse illustré, while being more concise, abundantly illustrated, scientifically more founded, and setting itself the objective of renewing the knowledge of its time (contains more than 235,000 articles and about 6,500 pages). This Larousse would be the subject of several updated reprints until the end of the 1950s, including sometimes with a different cover for the most recent reprints. A supplement in one volume appeared in 1953, completing the initial encyclopedic work (editions before 1949).

Plates Trees and Gardens from the Larousse du 20th century

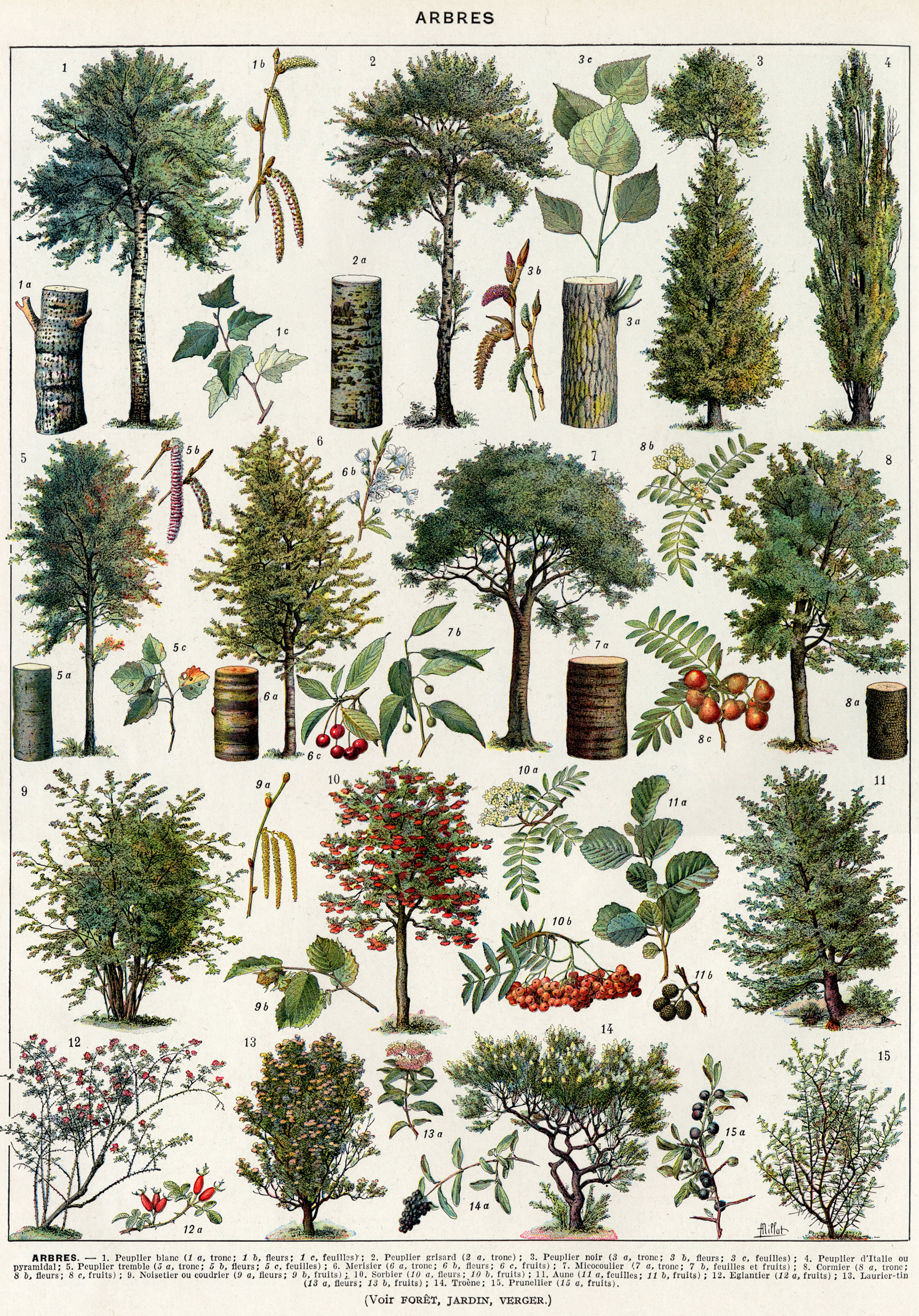
Trees: wood, leaves, fruits, etc., first plate.

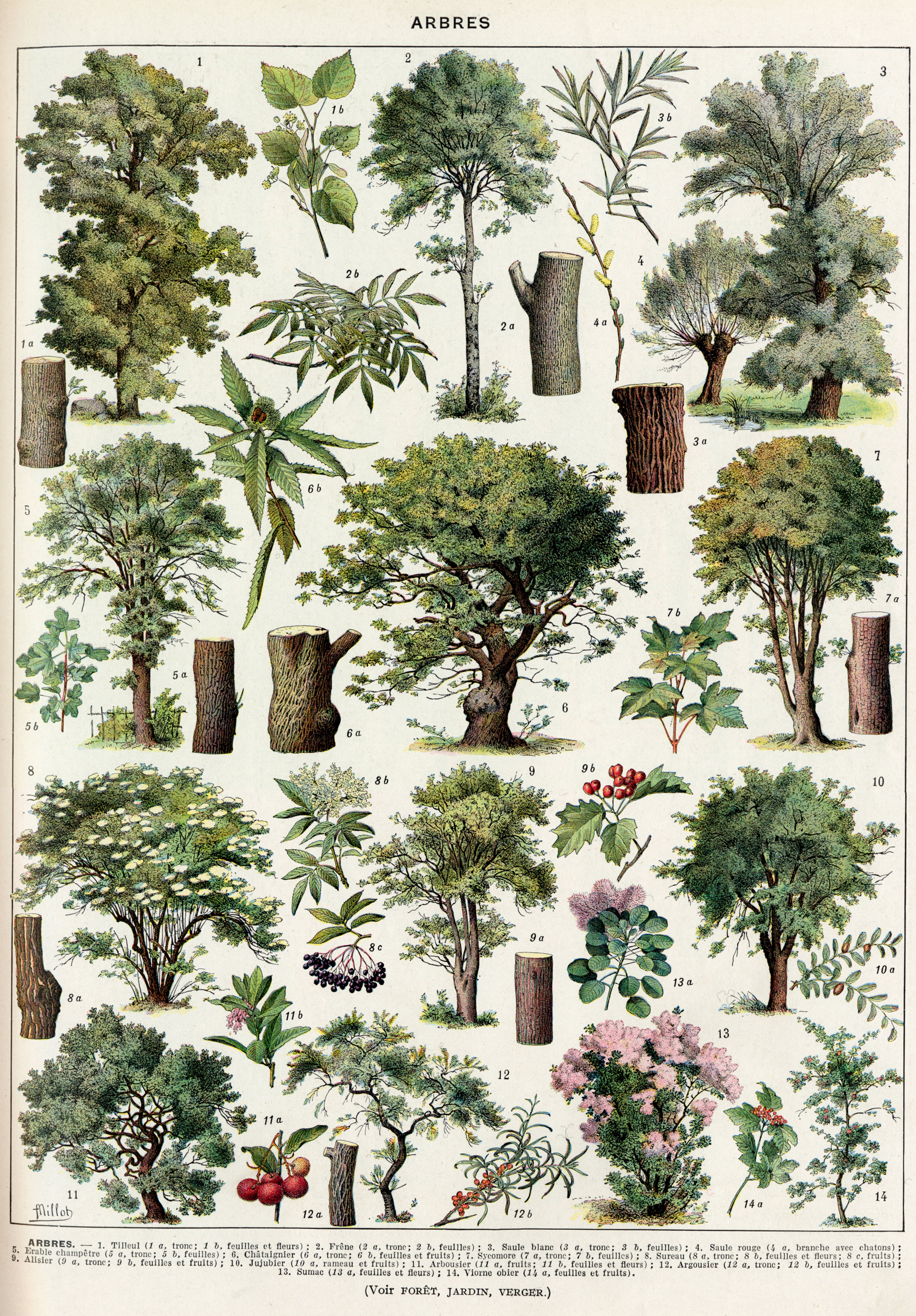
Trees: wood, leaves, fruits, etc., second plate.

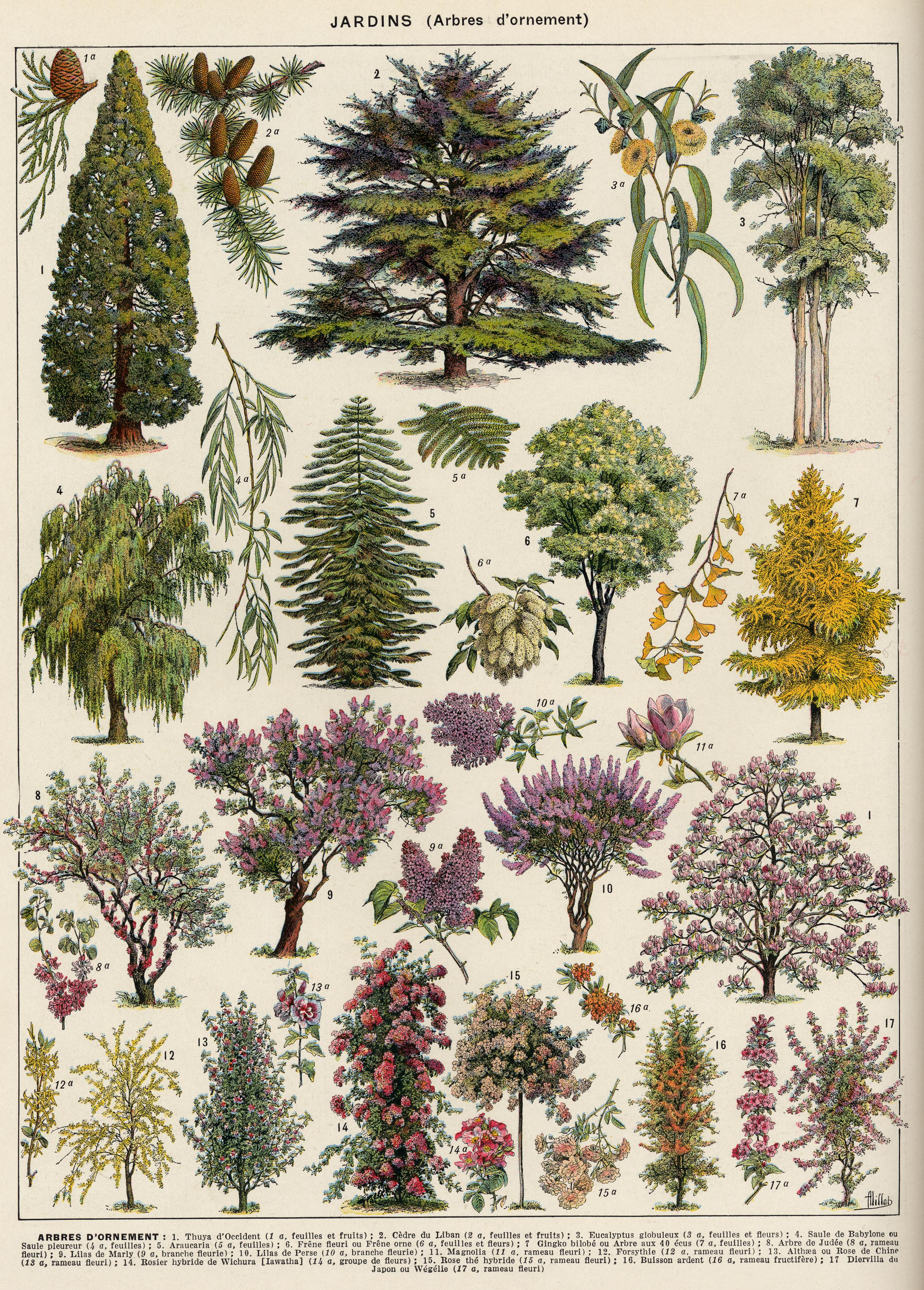
Gardens: ornamental trees, first plate.

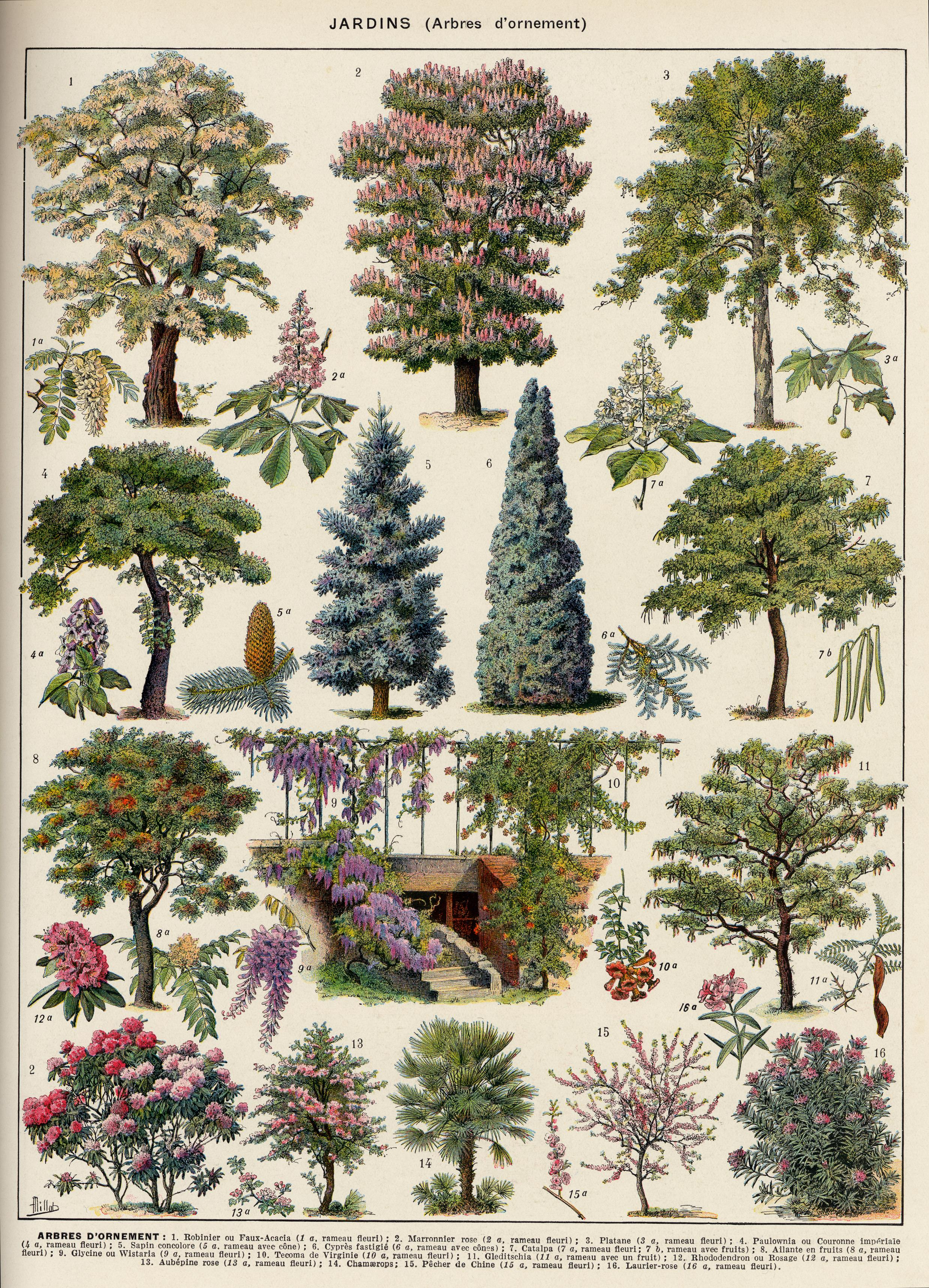
Gardens: ornamental trees, second plate.

In 1936 (volume 1) and 1937 (volume 2) came out the Grand Mémento encyclopédique Larousse, in two volumes, which aims to be a "systematic and methodical exposition" of encyclopedic knowledge, complementary to the alphabetical exposition procedure of the other Larousse encyclopedic dictionaries. The different chapters are signed by more than 100 collaborators, generally university professors. In 1955, a reworked edition of this Grand Mémento, still in two volumes of 1,180 pages each, but under the title Encyclopédie Larousse méthodique. Finally, in 1967 and 1968, the reworking of these two volumes into a three-volume version called Encyclopédie générale Larousse was published (reprints in 1977 and 1983).

In 1938, the Larousse gastronomique, under the direction of Prosper Montagné, experienced significant bookstore success: it was translated worldwide and continues to be reprinted (updated and reworked) to this day.

The "Classiques Larousse" (1933) also appeared at this time, a series of concise monographs on major authors, which would later become the “Nouveaux Classiques Larousse” collection (1950s-1970s).

In 1948 (volume 1) and in 1949 (volume 2) appeared the Nouveau Larousse universel, updated successor to the Larousse universel of 1922. Then came a new updated version in the early 1960s under the name Larousse universel (two volumes). It was succeeded by a reworked version (updated in particular with photos, diagrams, and maps in color and black and white) in 1969 titled Nouveau Larousse universel (two volumes).

Le Nouveau Petit Larousse illustré, an encyclopedic dictionary, was republished in 1948, 1952 (centenary edition reworked and augmented), and 1959. This last edition, to mark the centenary of the founding of the Librairie Larousse, contains a brochure containing the list of words deleted since the 1948 edition, made available to crossword enthusiasts.

From 1960 to 1975, the Grand Larousse encyclopédique in ten volumes and two supplements were published, bearing a logo drawn by Jean Picart Le Doux.

In 1965, the Larousse L3 (three volumes), which is the condensed version of the Grand Larousse encyclopédique, was aimed at a wider public due to its lower acquisition cost. Reprints (sometimes updated and with different covers) continued until about 1997 (mainly in five volumes but also in four or six volumes like the Larousse L6).

=== The turning point of the 1970s ===
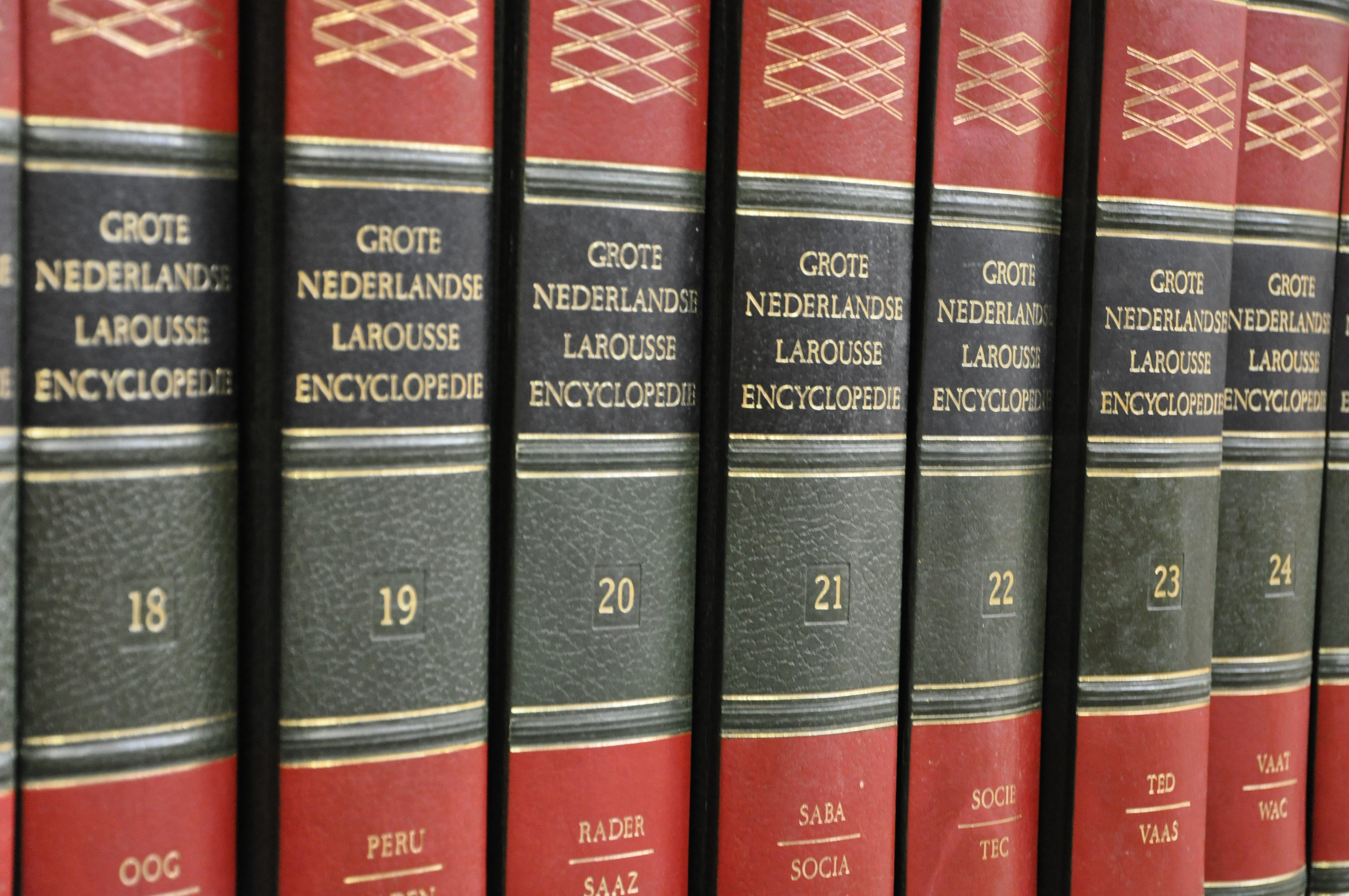
One of the editions in foreign languages of the great encyclopedic dictionaries of Larousse: the Grote nederlandse Larousse encyclopedie, in Dutch.

Since the creation of the house, the Larousse encyclopedic dictionaries have largely dominated the French market. However, towards the end of the 1960s, competition struck on two fronts. On the one hand, supremacy in dictionary matters ended with the publication in 1967 of the Petit Robert. On the other hand, on the encyclopedia side, the threat came from the publication starting in 1968 of the Encyclopædia Universalis.

The response from the Larousse house took the form of a Grande Encyclopédie Larousse in 22 volumes (twenty encyclopedic volumes, one index, and one atlas) published from 1971 to 1978. It is completed by two supplements (1981 and 1985). Appeared in the same period (1971 to 1979) the Grand Larousse de la langue française in seven volumes, but this was a commercial failure; a last edition appearing around 1989 (competition from the SNL publishing house - Dictionnaires Le Robert) while the general encyclopedia in three volumes published in 1968 proved to be a high-quality support, open and accessible to the greatest number. At the same time, the publisher launched a series of encyclopedic and educational fascicles sold in newsstands.

The Grand Larousse encyclopédique was entirely reworked at the end of the 1970s. Completed, updated, and brought up to date, the new encyclopedic dictionary appeared under the name Grand Dictionnaire encyclopédique Larousse (GDEL) in 10 and 15 volumes in 1982. The revised and corrected edition in 1986 and published in January 1987, was renamed Grand Larousse universel (GLU). It is divided into 15 volumes (main base of the work still with the same number of pages), to which is added a Supplément published in 1992. The following reprints, until 1997, of the GLU contain an "Actualia" part (update of new words, etc.) directly at the end of each volume.

Larousse published the encyclopedia Théma in the 1990s (until the mid-2000s). Le Grand Larousse illustré appeared in 2006, whose design is conceived by Philippe Starck (three volumes and one CD-ROM; another version includes an infrared stylus in addition), which has as its base Le petit Larousse illustré. At the end of 2007, Le grand Larousse encyclopédique was published in two volumes.

Also published by Larousse is a mini encyclopedia in one volume called Mémo (1989, 2001, etc.) or Le nouveau Mémo (1999), then renamed Nomade or Micro encyclopédie (2006 edition) under a slightly more compact format but with identical content (simple reduction of photos, texts slightly updated, and diagrams).

=== Changes in shareholding and management ===
In 1983, the Larousse company, which had remained a family business for more than 125 years, joined CEP Communication, then the Cité group. The latter was absorbed by Havas in 1997, then by Vivendi.

In 2004, following the ousting of Jean-Marie Messier and the dismantling of Vivendi, Larousse joined the Hachette group (Éditions Larousse company), its editorial fund belonging to the Lagardère group (Larousse SA company) through a management lease contract.

In 2006, Isabelle Jeuge-Maynart was appointed by Hachette Livre as President and CEO of Larousse. She is also Director of the Hachette Education division and CEO of Hachette Board Games.

Over the years, and with the reduction in the company's workforce, Larousse gradually shared its historic premises, located from 15 to 21 rue du Montparnasse, with Fayard and Armand Colin and, since 2016, with Le Livre de poche, Stock, Calmann-Lévy, etc.

== Other publications ==
=== Linguistics ===
Larousse also publishes journals and essays on language and the French language, including the general public periodical Vie et langage published between 1952 and 1974, and whose editor-in-chief was Alain Guillermou, as well as specialized journals like Langages (from 1966) or Langue française (from 1969). Other examples include works on linguistics, such as those published in the 1970s in the "Langue et langage" collection edited by Jean Dubois.

==== Online content ====
From May 2008, Larousse offered online numerous encyclopedic contents. In order to compete with Wikipedia, a contributive space was created. However, articles and illustrations from Larousse works and teams are presented distinctly from content contributed by volunteer Internet users. On this last platform, each author controls their articles, which they can withdraw. The contributive space was removed in 2013. Furthermore, the contents of certain Larousse works are available on Gallica, the site of the BNF, which offers digitized content, including the Grand Larousse de la langue française.

=== Officiel du Scrabble ===
Larousse has been, since 1989, the publisher of L'Officiel du jeu Scrabble, the official dictionary of French-language Scrabble.

== Visual identity ==
The isolated dandelion flower in a circle representative of the globe, and dispersing the achenes of knowledge, as well as the motto "Je sème à tout vent" (I sow to every wind), date back to 1876, when the designer Émile-Auguste Reiber made it the emblem of Larousse, the choice of this flower suggesting that the dictionary proposes to dispense familiar and unpretentious science. Associated with the motto, the allegory of the Sower (a nymph who has the right hand on the heart and who holds with the left hand a dandelion, blowing on the pappus) appeared in 1890 and is due to the poster artist Eugène Grasset.

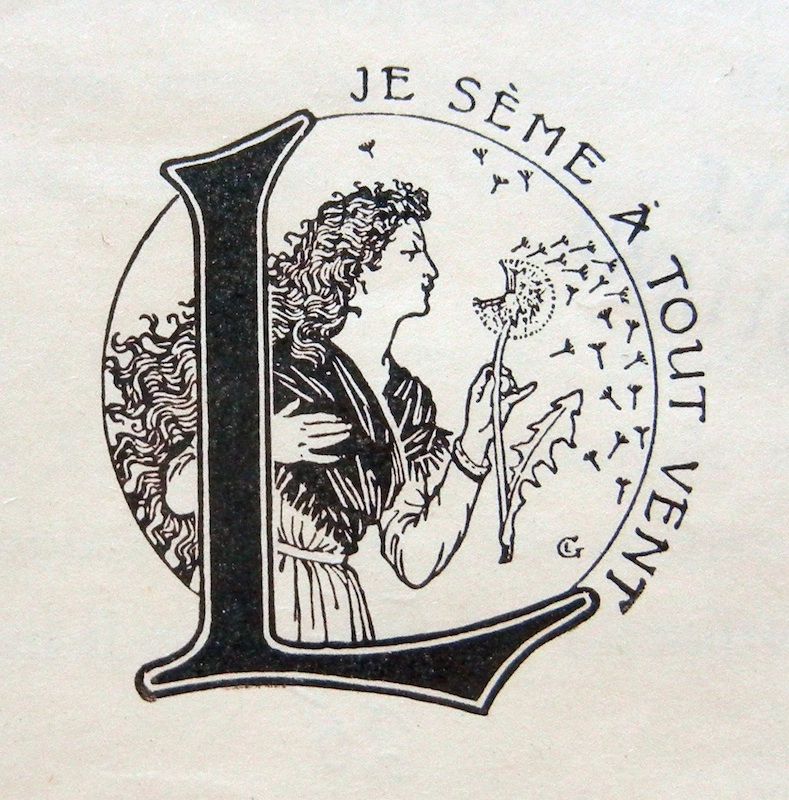
Larousse logo drawn by Eugène Grasset

According to the company legend, it is in the family home of Claude Augé (editor-in-chief of Larousse) in L'Isle-Jourdain that Grasset was inspired by Claude Augé's wife. Accompanied by the letter L and the motto, the Sower becomes the famous logo of the Larousse editions.

As the years passed, this logo was modernized and increasingly stylized: in the creation of Jean Picart Le Doux, from 1955 to 1970, the bust is no longer represented and the hair appears in the form of flames; return to the Sower of Grasset in the 1980s; new logo, very stylized from the 1990s; design of the jackets and the slipcase conceived by Philippe Starck, in 2006, for Le Grand Larousse illustré.

Still in the 2000s, while revisiting the logo of the Sower of Eugène Grasset, Larousse called on Christian Lacroix, Moebius, then Karl Lagerfeld (1999) or Jean-Charles de Castelbajac (2014) to "restyle" Petit Larousse.

== Evolution of the directorial structure ==
Throughout the history of this family business, it has been highly complex:

- 1851–1875: Librairie Pierre Larousse (1817–1875) & Pierre-Augustin Boyer (1821–1896)
- 1875:
  - Bookstore: Pierre-Augustin Boyer, Émile Moreau (1842–1919) and Georges Moreau (1853–1934), his nephews
  - Publishing: Pauline Suzanne, widow Larousse (1825–1890) and her nephew Jules Hollier-Larousse (1842–1909)
- 1885: New company V^{ve} P. Larousse et C^{ie}, unifying all associates
- 1887–1919: Paul Adrien Gillon (1853–1934), nephew of Boyer, appointed managing director
- 1890: Hollier-Larousse et C^{ie} company
- 1897–1920: Claude Augé, associate director
- 1909: Moreau, Augé, Gillon & C^{ie} company
- 1920: Gillon, Augé, Hollier-Larousse, Moreau & C^{ie} Company
  - Direction: Paul Augé (1920–1951), then André Gillon (1880–1969)
- 1931: Formation of a first SARL
  - 1950–1985: Claude Dubois (1924–2012), editor-in-chief of dictionaries and encyclopedias
- 1968: Librairie Larousse, second SARL
- 1972: Larousse SA
  - Commercial director: François de L'Espée (1943–1998), son-in-law of André Gillon
- 1984: the numerous heirs sell their shares to CEP Communication

== See also ==
- Grand dictionnaire universel du XIXe siècle, 1866–1876 encyclopedia with 1877 and 1890 supplements
- Nouveau Larousse illustré (New Larousse Illustrated), 1897–1904 encyclopedia
- Grand Larousse encyclopédique, 1960-1964 encyclopedia
- Grand Dictionnaire Encyclopédique Larousse, 1982–1985 dictionary and encyclopedia
- Petit Larousse (1905)
