= Matelote =

French stew of fish in red or white wine

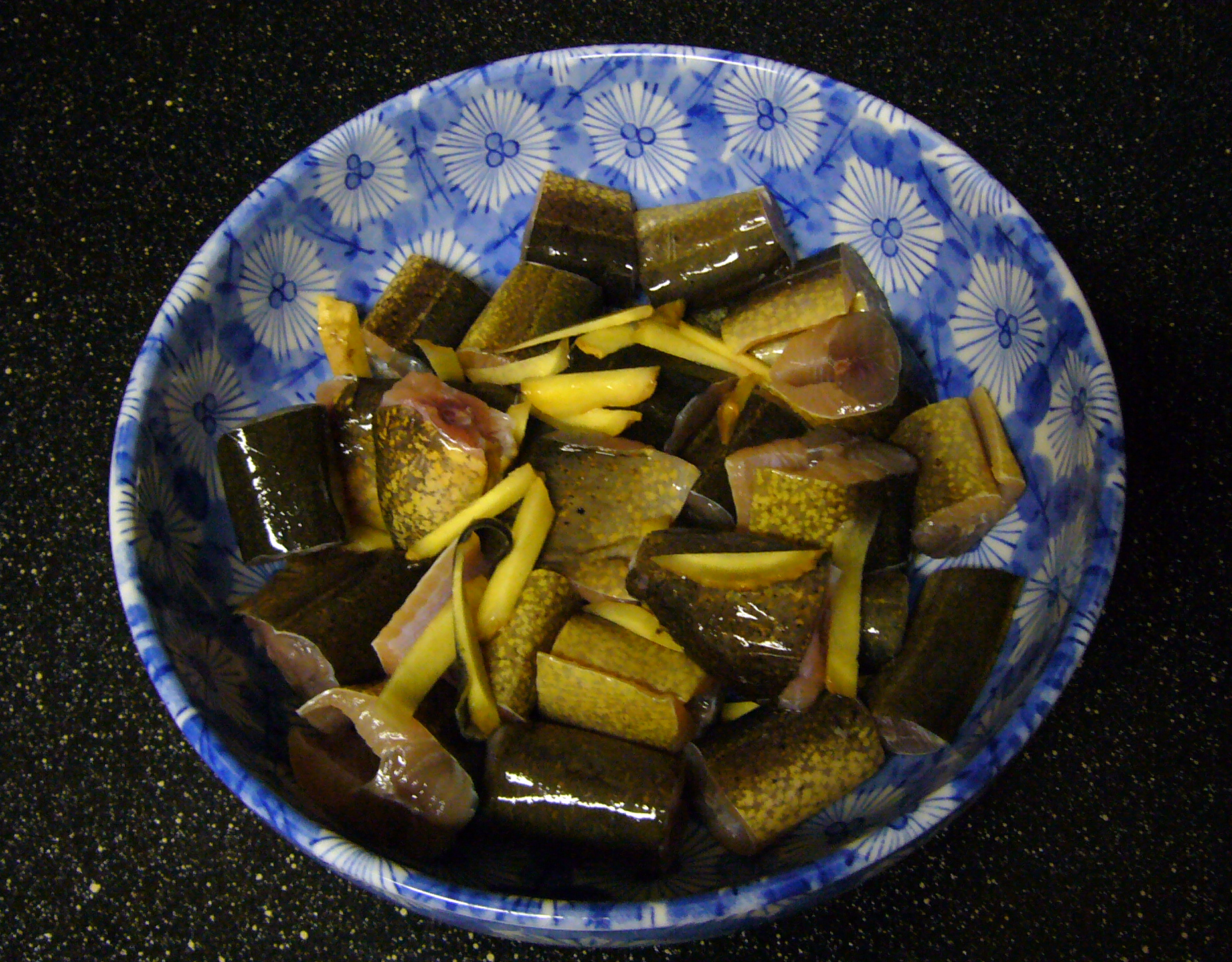
- Type: Stew
- Place of origin: France
- Main ingredients: Fish, wine

A matelote (French: [matlɔt]) is the name given in French cooking to a fish stew made with white or red wine. It is normally made with freshwater fish, and may contain a mixture of different fish or a single species. It is traditionally garnished with small onions and mushrooms that have been cooked with the fish.

== Name and techniques ==
Matelote is the feminine form of matelot, 'sailor'. The Dictionnaire de l'Académie française dates the word from the 16th century and defines it as "A dish consisting of one or more kinds of freshwater fish, stewed with wine and herbs". The term is recorded in English use from the 18th century onward. (Note: In English usage the word can mean either the fish stew or, more rarely, a sailor's dance.) Matelotes are also called meurettes, pochouses, pauchouses, potchouzes, or waterzoï according to district and method of preparation.

According to Prosper Montagné in Larousse Gastronomique, the only matelote made from sea fish is the matelote à la normande, which is made with sole, conger eel and gurnet. Montagné adds, "The term matelote is also loosely and improperly applied to dishes made of veal and poultry. We confine ourselves merely to mentioning this misnomer. We cannot recommend that it should be used in the drawing-up of menus".

Most matelotes are garnished with small onions and mushrooms cooked with the fish, and often with freshwater crayfish cooked in a court-bouillon. Croutons or other variants of fried bread are generally served with the dish.

== Variants ==
Name	Contents	Ref
Matelote d'anguille (eel)	Eel cut in pieces, sautéed in butter, flambéed with cognac, cooked in red wine, thickened with butter and flour, garnished with button onions, mushrooms, crayfish tails and heart-shaped croutons.	
Matelote à la bourguignonne or matelote de meunier or meurette	Made from all kinds of freshwater fish – small carp, pickerel, eel, barbel – cut into pieces, cooked in red wine with carrots, onions, garlic and herbs. Flaming Burgundy marc is added and the sauce is thickened with butter and flour. Garnished with garlic bread.	
Calmar (squid) en matelote	Squid tentacles cut in pieces, shallow fried in oil with chopped onions, garlic, diced tomatoes and herbs, cooked in white wine. Garnished with mushrooms and button onions, sprinkled with chopped parsley.	
Matelote à la canotière (rower)	Made with carp and eel, with onion, garlic and herbs, cooked in dry white wine. Flambéed with brandy before further cooking with added mushrooms and small onions. Served with freshwater crayfish cooked in a court-bouillon.	
Carpe en matelote	Carp cut in pieces, cooked in red wine, flambéed with cognac, thickened with butter and flour, garnished with mushrooms and button onions, surrounded with fried heart shaped croutons.	
Matelote à l'espagnole (Spanish style)	Freshwater fish cut in pieces, flambéed with brandy, cooked in cider, stock boiled down and mixed with fish velouté, garnished with crayfish tails, and poached oysters.	
Matelote à l'italienne (Italian style)	Tench and pike cut in pieces, cooked in red wine with chopped onions and herbs, thickened with flour and butter, garnished with mushrooms and button onions.	
Matelote à la marinière (sailor style)	Carp, pike, eel and tench cut in pieces, flambéed with cognac, cooked in white wine or alternatively champagne. The stock is reduced and mixed with fish velouté. Served with button onions, mushrooms, whole crayfish and heart-shaped croûtons.	
Matelote à la meunière (in the style of the miller's wife)	Freshwater fish cooked in red wine, flambéed with cognac, and then cooked in stock thickened with flour and butter. Served garnished with crayfish and heart shaped croutons.	
Matelote à la normande (Normandy style)	Gurnards, sole and small conger eels cut in pieces, flambéed with Calvados cooked in cider, stock boiled down, mixed with fish velouté and cream, garnished with poached oysters, mushrooms, mussels, crayfish tails and heart-shaped croutons.	
Matelote à la parisienne	Carp, eel, pike, perch and trout cut in pieces and cooked in red wine, thickened with flour and butter. Served with crayfish tails, button onions, small fish dumplings, mushrooms and truffles.	
Matelote des pêcheurs (fishermen's style)	Carp, eel, pike, perch and trout, cut in pieces, cooked in red wine, thickened with flour and butter, garnished with button onions and mushrooms.	
Pochouse	Made from a variety of freshwater fish. Flambéed in brandy and cooked in red wine thickened with butter and flour, with coarsely diced pork belly, mushrooms and small glazed. Served with garlic bread.	
Matelote à la remoise (Rheims style)	Pike cut in pieces, poached in fish stock and dry champagne, stock boiled down and mixed with fish velouté, garnished with poached fish roes, mushrooms, truffle slices and heart-shaped croutons.	
Pochouse de Verdun-sur-le-Doubs	Verdun Style carp, pike, eel and tenth cut in pieces, flambéed with cognac, cooked in red wine with a bunch of herbs, stock thickened with flour and butter, garnished with diced fried bacon, glazed onions, mushrooms and croutons rubbed with garlic.	
Waterzoï	Eel, carp, pike; cooked in court-bouillon with salt, pepper, faggot, sage, celery and butter, garnish with slices of bread and butter.	

Despite the disapproval of Larousse, calves' brains may be served en matelote, poached in stock with sliced onions, carrots and red wine, served sliced, garnished with the glazed onions, mushrooms and heart-shaped croutons typical of matelotes. In the mid-18th-century the English cook Hannah Glasse published a recipe for what she called "A Pig Matelot", which included crayfish, eels, white wine and herbs, but also most of a whole pig, chopped into pieces. In 1909 Auricoste de Lazarque published a recipe for Matelote sans poisson, for those who have been let down by their fishmonger. It uses most of the usual ingredients but replaces the missing fish with slices of firmly cooked omelette.

== Notes, references and sources ==
=== Sources ===
- Bickel, Walter (1989). Hering's Dictionary of Classical and Modern Cookery (eleventh ed.). London: Virtue. ISBN 978-3-8057-0307-9.
- David, Elizabeth (1999) [1980]. Elizabeth David Classics. London: Grub Street. ISBN 978-1-902304-27-4.
- David, Elizabeth (2008) [1960]. French Provincial Cooking. London: Folio Society. OCLC 809349711.
- Glasse, Hannah (1746). The Art of Cookery, Made Plain and Easy. London: Ashburn's. OCLC 1156008991.
- Montagné, Prosper (1976). Larousse Gastronomique. London: Hamlyn. ISBN 978-0-600-02352-4. OCLC 1285641881.
- Saulnier, Louis (1978). Le Répertoire de la Cuisine (fourteenth ed.). London: Jaeggi. OCLC 1086737491.
