= A. Demandre =

French grammarian and lexicographer

A. Demandre (born in the 18th century – 1808) was an 18th-century French grammarian and lexicographer. He is known only by the name Demanbre which he put down a dedicatory epistle.

He is the author of the Dictionnaire de l'Élocution françoise (Paris, 1769, 2 vol.in-8°). This work is also known under the name Dictionnaire portatif des règles de la Langue Françoise, dated 1770 for certain copies of the first edition. This book was printed care of abbé de Fontenai in 1802.

The dictionary gathers all that is related to Elocution Françoise, that is the principles of grammar, logic, rhetorics, versification, syntax, construction, composition method, prosody, pronunciation, spelling, and generally the rules necessary to properly write and speak French, either in prose or in verse.

== Bibliography ==
- 1866: Grand dictionnaire universel du XIXe siècle by Pierre Larousse (1868–1877).
