= Augé (surname) =

Augé or Auge is a surname. Notable people with the surname include:

- Claude Augé (1854–1924), French pedagogue, publisher and lexicographer
- Gaspard Augé (born 1979), French musician
- Laura Augé (born 1992), French synchronized swimmer
- Les Auge (1953–2002), American ice hockey defenseman
- Marc Augé (born 1935), French anthropologist
- Olivier-Maurice Augé (1840–1897), Canadian politician
- Paul Augé (1881–1951), French publisher, romanist and lexicographer
- Stéphane Augé (born 1974), French cyclist
