= Grand Dictionnaire Encyclopédique Larousse =

Following the work of Pierre Larousse on the Grand dictionnaire Universel, the Grand Dictionnaire Encyclopédique Larousse (French pronunciation: [ɡʁɑ̃ diksjɔnɛːʁ ɑ̃siklɔpedik laʁus]), a ten-volume dictionary, was published in Paris between 1982 and 1985 by Éditions Larousse. It is an encyclopedia and a dictionary merged in a single alphabetical listing. Beneath the standard dictionary (meanings, usages) entry comes the encyclopedic section.

Articles are illustrated by photographs, maps, chronologies and diagrams.
