= Grand Larousse encyclopédique =

French encyclopedic dictionary

The Grand Larousse encyclopédique en dix volumes ("Big Larousse encyclopedia in ten volumes") is a French encyclopedic dictionary published by Larousse between February 1960 and August 1964, with two later supplements that update the content to 1975.

It is both a dictionary, focusing on the study and the presentation of the words of the French language, and an encyclopaedia, covering all branches of knowledge. In 1971, Larousse began publishing the much larger 20-volume "Grande Encyclopédie Larousse", with functional dictionary entries diminished, and regular encyclopedia articles greatly expanded.

== Online version ==
In May 2008, Larousse launched its encyclopedia online. In addition to the verified content from the paper encyclopedia, it is open to external contributors. Each article is signed by a single author who remains the only one authorized to make modifications.

== See also ==
- Grand dictionnaire universel du XIXe siècle
- Nouveau Larousse illustré
- Petit Larousse
