= Nouveau Larousse illustré =

French-language encyclopedia

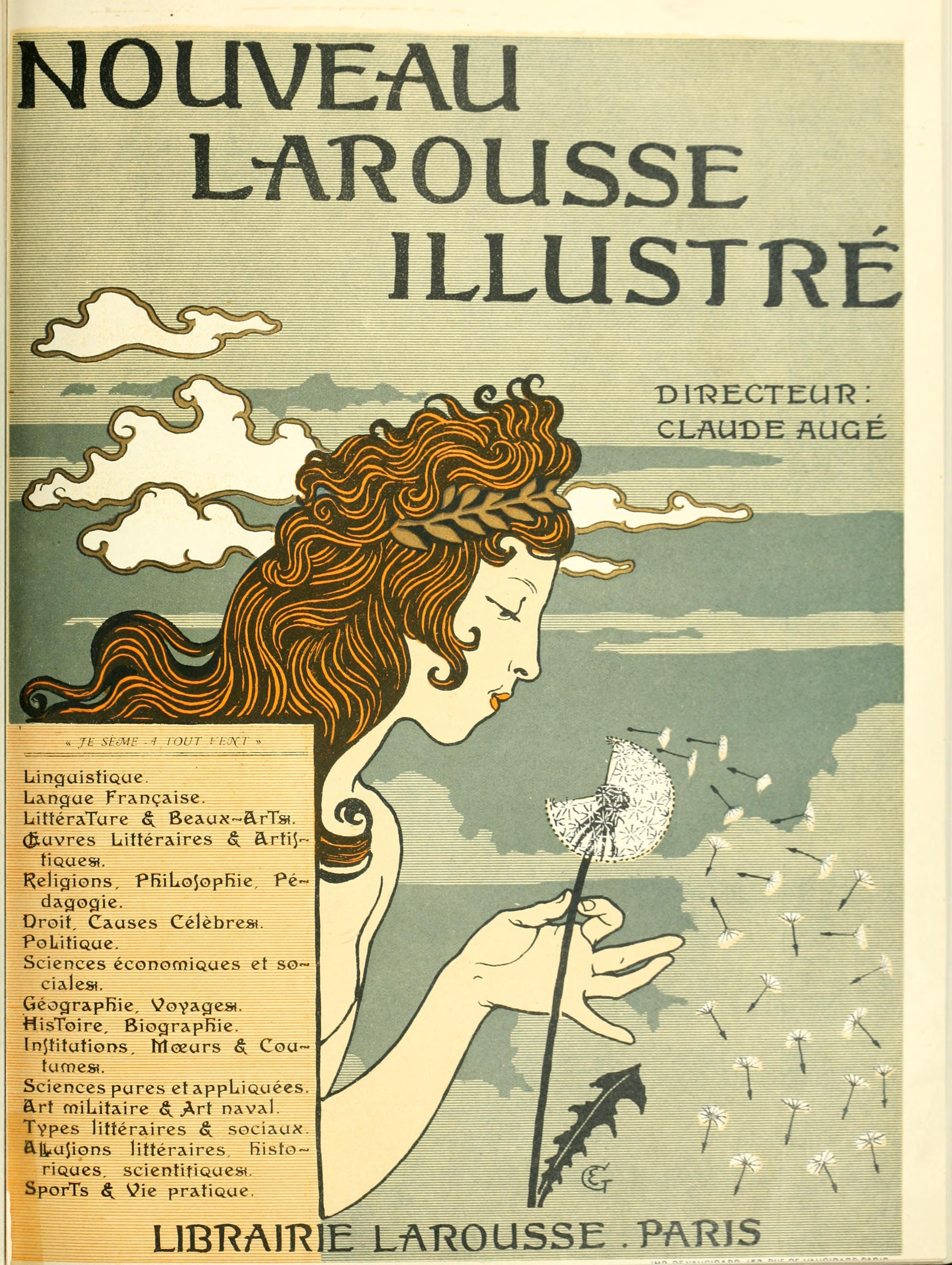
Cover of a volume of the Nouveau Larousse illustré

The Nouveau Larousse illustré (French pronunciation: [nuvo laʁus ilystʁe], New Larousse Illustrated) was an illustrated French language encyclopedia published by Éditions Larousse between 1897 and 1904, in 7 volumes and a supplement. It was essentially a scaled-down version of the Grand dictionnaire universel du XIXe siècle (Great universal dictionary of the 19th century) of Pierre Larousse, but updated and written in a more neutral, scientific style under the editorship of Claude Augé (1854−1924).

The encyclopedia consisted of 7,600 pages containing 237,000 articles, with 49,000 black and white illustrations, over 500 maps and 89 colour plates.

== See also ==
- Éditions Larousse
- Grand dictionnaire universel du XIXe siècle, 1866–1876 encyclopedia with 1877 and 1890 supplements
- Grand Larousse encyclopédique, 1960-1964 encyclopedia with later supplements

Volume	From	To
Volume 1	A	Bello
Volume 2	Belloc	Ch
Volume 3	Ci	D
Volume 4	E	G
Volume 5	H	Meld
Volume 6	Mele	Po
Volume 7	Pr	Z
Supplement	A	Z
