= Augen (disambiguation) =

Augen is the German word meaning eyes.

It may refer to:

- Augen, large, lenticular eye-shaped mineral grains or aggregates visible in metamorphic rocks.
  - Augen Bluffs, a group of rock bluffs named after the mineral along the Marsh Glacier, Antarctica.
- "Augen auf!", 2004 single from the German industrial metal group Oomph!'s album Wahrheit oder Pflicht
- Augen I (1884–1975), fourth Indian Catholicose of the Malankara Orthodox Syrian Church
