= Paul Augé =

Paul Augé (4 July 1881, L'Isle-Jourdain – 23 July 1951, Cabourg) was a 20th-century French publisher, romanist and lexicographer. In 1920, Paul Augé took over the publishing of the dictionary and lexicum of the Éditions Larousse from his father Claude Augé.

== Editions ==
- from 1927 to 1933: édition du deuxième grand dictionnaire du XXe, Larousse du XX, six volumes édition
- 1936: Grand Mémento
- 1948: Nouveau Larousse universel
