= L'Isle-Jourdain, Gers =

L'Isle-Jourdain
- Commune
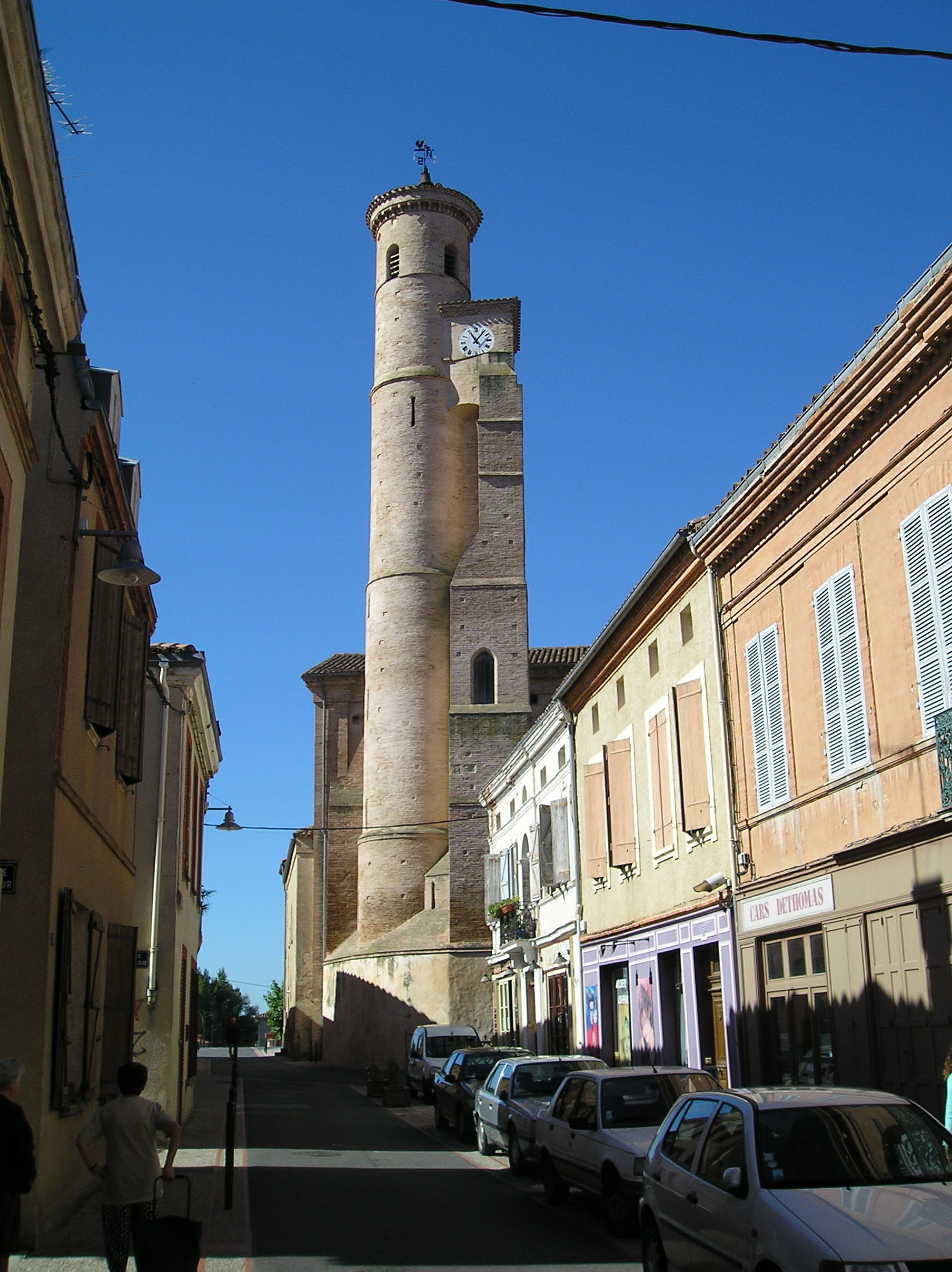
- The collegiate church tower in L'Isle-Jourdain

- Coat of arms
- Location of L'Isle-Jourdain
- Location within France Location within Occitanie
- Coordinates: 43°36′52″N 1°04′54″E
- Country: France
- Region: Occitania
- Department: Gers
- Arrondissement: Auch
- Canton: L'Isle-Jourdain

Government
  - Mayor (2020–2026): Francis Idrac
- Area^{1}: 70.48 km^{2} (27.21 sq mi)
- Elevation: 150 m (490 ft)
- Highest elevation: 304 m (997 ft)
- Lowest elevation: 136 m (446 ft)
- Population (2023): 9,537
  - Density: 135.3/km^{2} (350.5/sq mi)
- Time zone: UTC+01:00 (CET)
  - Summer (DST): UTC+02:00 (CEST)
- INSEE/Postal code: 32160 /32600
- ^{1} French Land Register data, which excludes lakes, ponds, glaciers > 1 km^{2} (0.386 sq mi or 247 acres) and river estuaries.

L'Isle-Jourdain (French pronunciation: [lil ʒuʁdɛ̃]; Occitan: L'Isla de Baish, [ˈlizlɔ ðe ˈβaʃ]; Catalan: Illa Jordà or L'Illa de Baix) is a commune in the Gers department, Occitania, Southwestern France. The lexicographers Claude (1854–1924) and Paul Augé (1881–1951) were born in L'isle-Jourdain as was the writer Armand Praviel (1875–1944).

== Geography ==
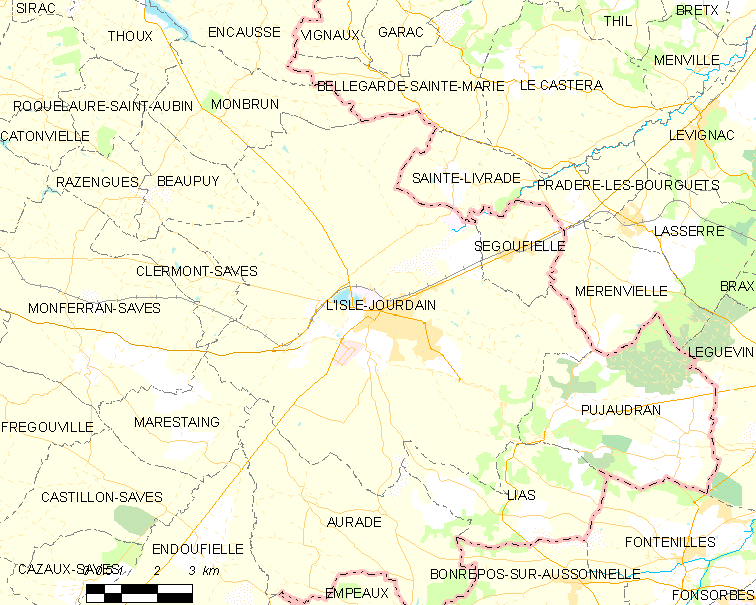
L'Isle-Jourdain and its surrounding communes

== Population ==
The inhabitants of the commune are known as Lislois in French.

Historical population

Year	Pop.	±% p.a.
1793	4,146	—
1800	3,792	−1.27%
1806	4,159	+1.55%
1821	4,257	+0.16%
1831	4,307	+0.12%
1841	4,933	+1.37%
1846	4,865	−0.28%
1851	4,921	+0.23%
1856	4,773	−0.61%
1861	4,867	+0.39%
1866	4,954	+0.35%
1872	4,864	−0.31%
1876	4,671	−1.01%
1881	4,479	−0.84%
1886	4,572	+0.41%
1891	4,442	−0.58%
1896	4,305	−0.62%
1901	4,122	−0.87%

Year	Pop.	±% p.a.
1906	3,885	−1.18%
1911	3,774	−0.58%
1921	3,313	−1.29%
1926	3,560	+1.45%
1931	3,535	−0.14%
1936	3,527	−0.05%
1946	3,536	+0.03%
1954	3,447	−0.32%
1962	3,675	+0.80%
1968	4,002	+1.43%
1975	4,195	+0.68%
1982	4,358	+0.55%
1990	5,029	+1.81%
1999	5,560	+1.12%
2007	6,755	+2.46%
2012	7,679	+2.60%
2017	8,851	+2.88%
2023	9,537	+1.25%

Source: EHESS and INSEE (1968-2023)

== Twin towns ==
L'Isle-Jourdain is twinned with:

- Carballo, Spain
- Motta di Livenza, Italy

== See also ==
- Save (Garonne)
- Communes of the Gers department
