= Augé (automobile) =

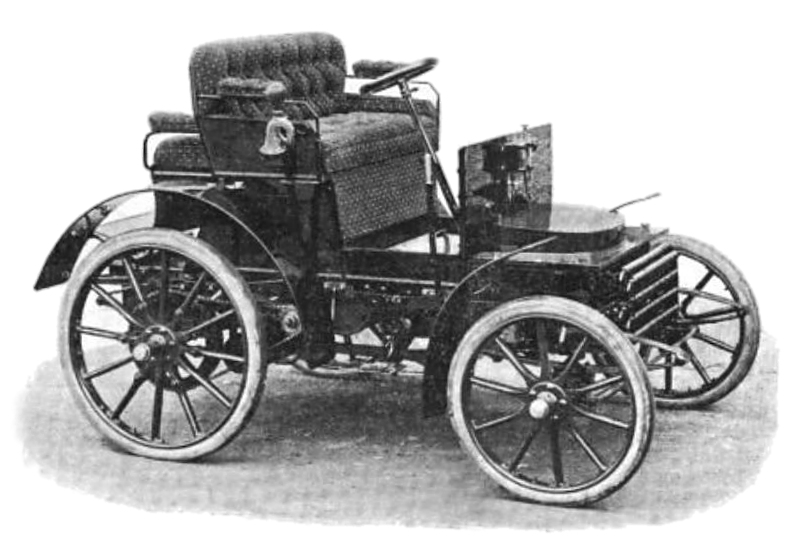
Augé automobile, c.1900.

The Augé was a motor car made by Daniel Augé et Cie, Levallois-Perret, Seine, France, from 1898 to about 1901.

It was powered by the Cyclope engine, so called because the original models used hot-tube ignition, the platinum tubes being heated with one lamp. After 1899, electric ignition was used for the 4hp (3kW) horizontal 2-cylinder engine. Power was transmitted by belts to a countershaft, the final drive being by chain. Later models used 5, 7, or 8 hp, both horizontal and vertical. It was offered in a dos-a-dos (four seats, two in back facing backward and two in front facing forward) and a three-seat, or troika, version. Sometimes the vehicles were called Cyclope.
