= Petit Larousse =

French-language encyclopedic dictionary

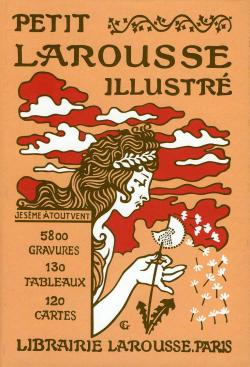
Le Petit Larousse in its original form designed by Eugène Grasset, 1905 edition (ISBN 2-03-530849-6).

Le Petit Larousse Illustré, commonly known simply as Le Petit Larousse (French pronunciation: [lə pə.ti laʁus]), is a French-language encyclopedic dictionary published by Éditions Larousse. It first appeared in 1905 and was edited by Claude Augé, following Augé's Dictionnaire complet illustré (1889). The one-volume work has two main sections: a dictionary featuring common words and an encyclopedia of proper nouns. Le Petit Larousse 2007 (published in 2006) includes 150,000 definitions and 5,000 illustrations. A Spanish-version, the El Pequeño Larousse Ilustrado and an Italian version, Il Piccolo Rizzoli Larousse, have also been published.

The motto of Pierre Larousse, the namesake of Éditions Larousse, perpetuated in Larousse's publications is "Je sème à tout vent" ("I sow to all winds"). This motto inspires the cover art of Le Petit Larousse, which typically features a female figure blowing dandelion seeds.

Upon its 100th anniversary, a history of Le Petit Larousse was published called La dent-de-lion, la semeuse et le Petit Larousse written by Jean Pruvost (fr).

The following editions are available:

- Compact
- Coffret Noël
- Grand Format
- Grand Format Coffret Noël
- Collection Multimedia
- CD-ROM Edition Prestige
