= Prosper Montagné =

French chef (1865–1948)

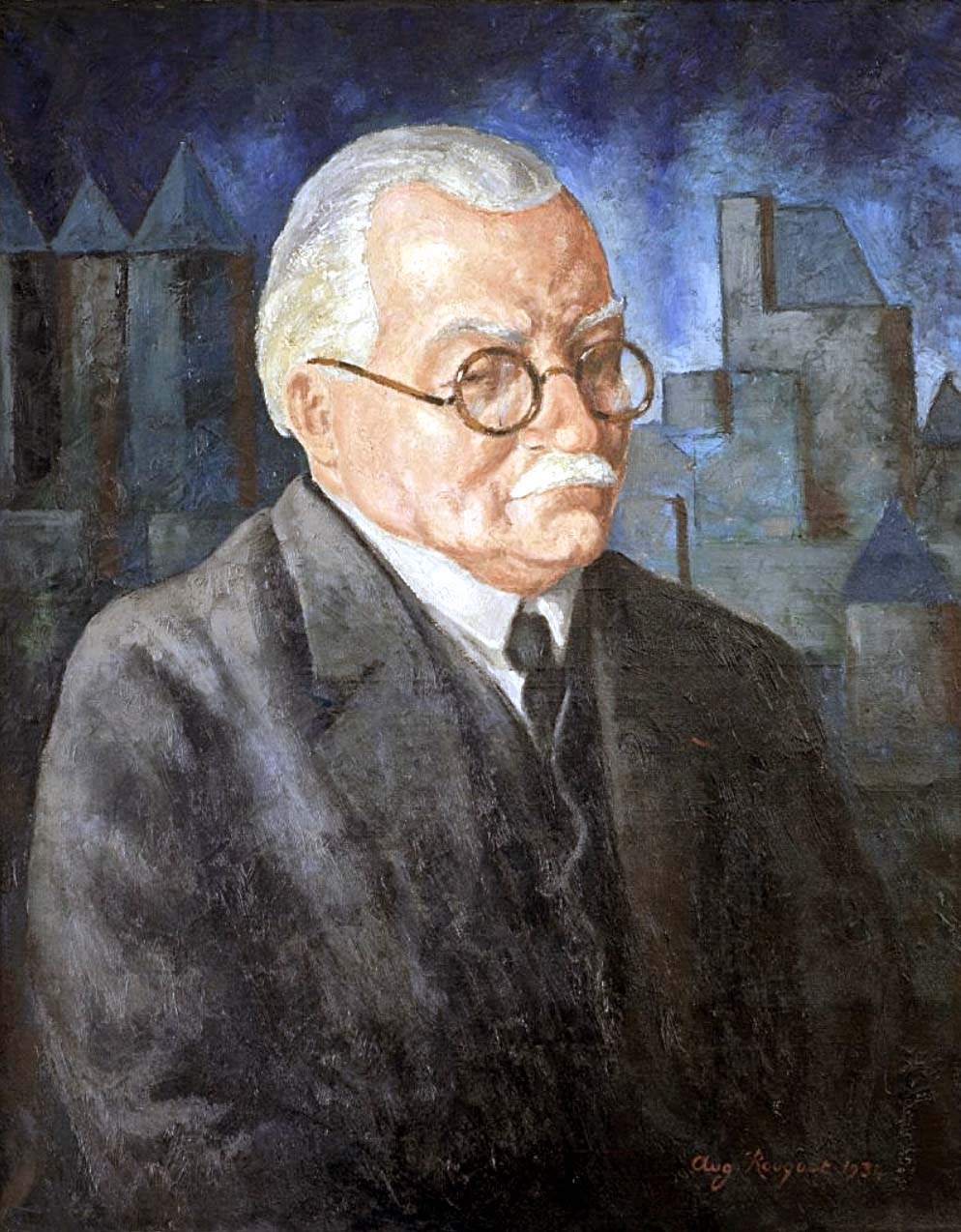
- Prosper Montagné
- Born: Paul Marius Octave Prosper; 14 November 1865; Carcassonne, Aude, France
- Died: 22 April 1948 (aged 82)
- Occupations: Chef, culinary writer
- Era: Belle Époque
- Notable work: Larousse Gastronomique (1938)

Prosper Montagné (pronounced [pʁɔspɛʁ mɔ̃taɲe]; born Paul Marius Octave Prosper on 14 November 1865 – 22 April 1948), was a French chef of the Belle Époque and a culinary writer. He wrote books and articles on food, cooking, and gastronomy, including Larousse Gastronomique (1938), an encyclopedic dictionary about French culinary arts.

Montagné was one of the most influential French chefs of the early twentieth century. In the 1920s, he, his friend Auguste Escoffier, and Philéas Gilbert (their close friend and collaborator, and an acclaimed chef and writer), were the French chefs and culinary writers esteemed above others by many French journalists and writers. After Montagné's death, the chef and author Alfred Guérot's description of the troika as the "celebrated contemporary culinary trinity: Auguste Escoffier, the father; Philéas Gilbert, the son; Prosper Montagné, the spirit" reflects the reverence in which all three were held by the French culinary community.

== Early life and career in restaurant kitchens ==
Paul Marius Octave Prosper was born on 14 November 1865 in Carcassonne, Aude. He was the second child of Victor Germain Montagné, who managed a department store, and Clary Jeanne Roument. Upon leaving lycée (sixth form college) in Carcassonne, Prosper hoped to pursue a career in arts. However, his parents acquired an old hotel, L'Hôtel des Quatre-Saisons, in Toulouse. Prosper went to work in the hotel's kitchen, although he remained more interested in painting than cuisine. Hoping to pursue his son in a different direction, Prosper's father placed him in an apprenticeship at the Hôtel d'Angleterre in Cauterets, Hautes-Pyrénées, under one of the finest chefs of the period, Alphonse Meillon.

After completing his apprenticeship, Montagné became interested in cooking. He went to Paris to work in kitchens at Ambassadeurs Restaurant, then the Grand Hôtel. He thereafter worked at the Hôtel de Paris in Monte Carlo, where he met his friend and collaborator, Prosper Salles, until he had to report for his obligatory military service. In 1900, he returned to Paris and managed the kitchens at Pavillon d'Armenonville, Restaurant Ledoyen, and, finally, the Grand Hôtel once more. He left that position in 1907 to pursue his interests in culinary and gastronomic literature and journalism.

In 1920, he decided to open his own restaurant, Montagné Traiteur, rue de l'Echelle, Paris, which was frequented by le Tout-Paris, or the most celebrated artists, writers, gastronomes, and politicians of the day. But, he had to close the restaurant in 1930 for financial reasons. Soon after it closed, Leigh Hoffman wrote about the restaurant in The Chicago Tribune and the Daily News, describing it as a "small, quiet and dignified restaurant" well known to Americans. Hoffman continued: "Never presenting a large menu to choose from, M. Montagné conducted his restaurant with the idea that it was better to specialize in a few choice dishes cooked to perfection, than it was to make up a score of mediocre dishes and spoil them all. ... His one aim was to maintain the culinary traditions that had made France so justly famous, and the result was obtained by the fact that he himself, with his universal reputation, was always to be found ... personally supervising every dish that was served." He served as culinary consultant to La Rôtisserie de la Reine Pédauque, rue de la Pépinière, Paris, from 1939 to 1945.

== Publications ==
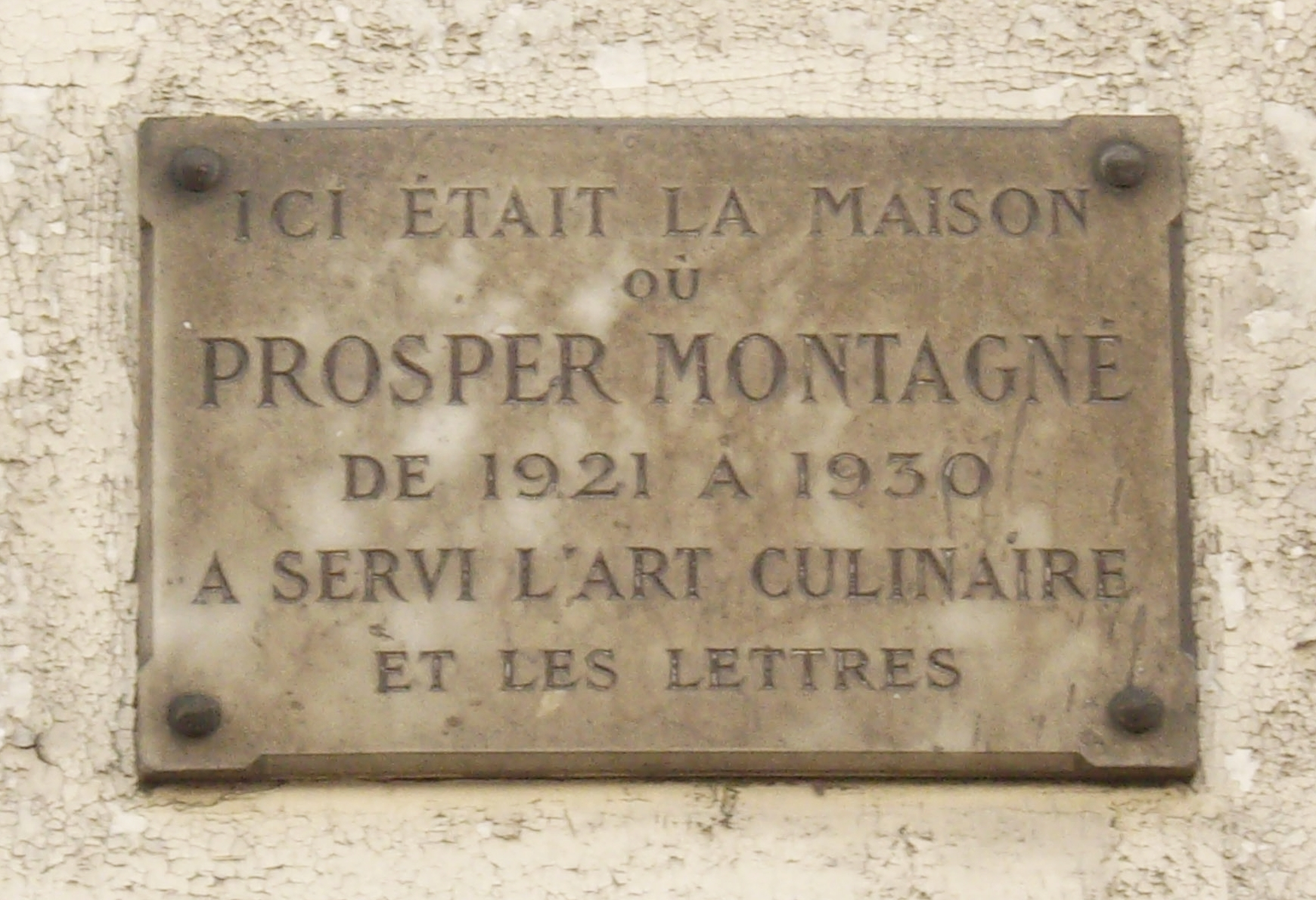
Plaque Prosper Montagné, 5 rue de l'Échelle, Paris 1

Montagné was a prolific culinary writer. His books include:

- La Grande cuisine illustrée, with Prosper Salles (1900)
- Le Livre de cuisine militaire en garnison, with Philéas Gilbert (informally called the Manuel Chéron) (1908)
- Le Livre de cuisine militaire aux manoeuvres et en campaign (1909)
- La Cuisine diététique, with Dr. Félix Regnault (1910)
- Manuel du bon cuistot et de la bonne ménagère (1918)
- Bonne chère, pas chère, ou les repas sans viande (1918)
- Le Grand livre de cuisine, with Prosper Salles (1929)
- Le Festin occitan (Collection des Ecrivains de l'Aude) (1930)
- Les Délices de la table, ou les Quatre saisons gourmandes (1931)
- Mon menu. Cuisine d'hygiène alimentaire, with Dr. Alfred Gottschalk (1936)
- Larousse Gastronomique, with Dr. Alfred Gottschalk (1938)
- La Cuisine avec et sans tickets (1941)

Montagné also contributed to many newspapers and magazines, including: Le Petit Parisien; L'Art Culinaire; Bulletin des Armées de la Republic (1916-1917); L'Eventail (Brussels); L'Oeuvre; Touche-à-Tout; Excelsior; La Vie Parisienne; Fémina; Gil-Blas; La Revue de la Femme; Nos Loisirs. He was also the editor-in-chief of La Revue Culinaire, a monthly publication started by the Société des cuisiniers de Paris, which began publication in 1920.

The Encyclopædia Britannica writes of him:

After Carême, the two men who probably had the greatest impact on French gastronomy and that of the world at large were Prosper Montagné and Georges-Auguste Escoffier. Montagné was one of the great French chefs of all time, and he achieved a secure place in gastronomic history by creating Larousse Gastronomique (1938), the basic encyclopaedia of French gastronomy. As a young man..., he came to the conclusion that all pièces montées, as well as superfluous garnitures and decorations, should be discarded.

Montagné was awarded the Knight of the Légion d'honneur, the highest French order of merit, in 1922.

He lends his name to the Club Prosper Montagné, a trade association of French food professionals.
