= Grand dictionnaire universel du XIXe siècle =

French encyclopedic dictionary

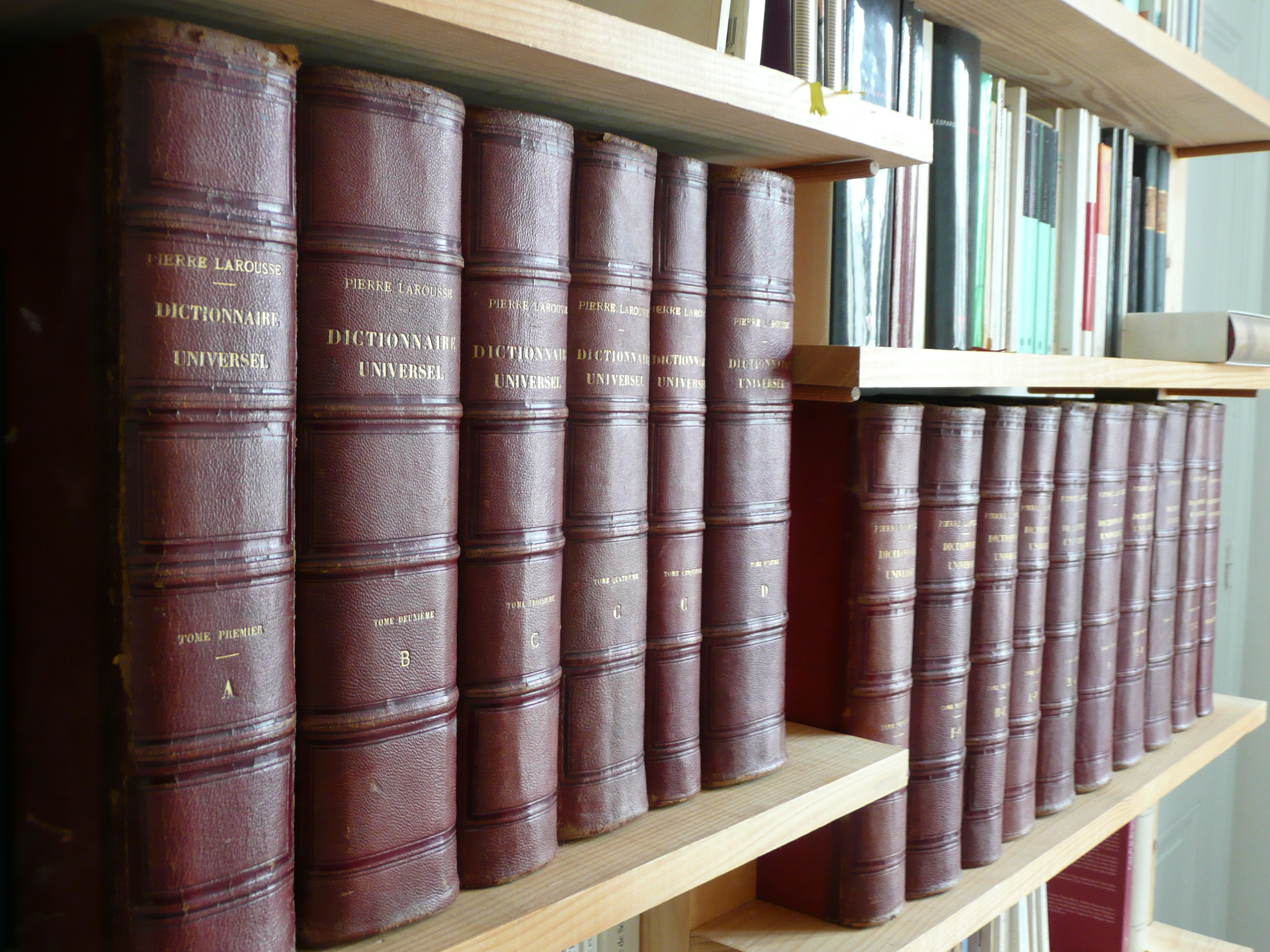
Grand Larousse du XIXe siècle.

The Grand dictionnaire universel du XIXe siècle (French pronunciation: [ɡʁɑ̃ diksjɔnɛːʁ ynivɛʁsɛl dy diznœvjɛm sjɛkl], Great Universal Dictionary of the 19th Century), often called the Grand Larousse du dix-neuvième (French pronunciation: [ɡʁɑ̃ laʁus dy diznœvjɛm]), is a French encyclopedic dictionary. It was planned, directed, published, and to a substantial degree written by Pierre Larousse, though he also relied on anonymous fellow contributors and though he died in 1875, before its completion. The publication of the Grand dictionnaire universel in 15 volumes of 1500 pages extended from 1866 to 1876. Two supplements were published in 1877 and 1890.

== Description ==
Volumes 1–15, covering A–Z, were issued from 1866 to 1876. A supplement (Volume 16) was published in 1877, and a second supplement (Volume 17), in 1890. The Larousse firm also published further supplements in the form of a magazine called Revue encyclopédique (1891–1900) then Revue universelle (1900–1905).

Unlike Émile Littré's contemporary dictionary, the Grand Larousse is primarily an encyclopedia. It is opinionated and has a distinctive and personal style.

One such instance of subjectivity appears regarding emperor Napoleon Bonaparte. For Pierre Larousse, what the Republic's general had done until the coup of 18 Brumaire was virtuous and glorious, but the coup and the subsequent rule of the consul and emperor were a tyrant's doings. Hence, the Grand Larousse du dix-neuvième had two entries: one for Bonaparte, Napoleon, who, according to the article, died on the 18 Brumaire (9 November 1799); and one for Napoleon referring to the consul and emperor. Though it is true that Napoleon Bonaparte "changed" his name to Napoleon I, he only did so at his crowning as emperor, not after the 18 Brumaire coup.

== Nouveau Larousse illustré ==
The Nouveau Larousse illustré was an illustrated encyclopedia published 1897–1904 by Éditions Larousse and edited by Claude Augé. It was essentially a scaled-down, updated and more neutral version of the Grand Larousse du dix-neuvième.

== See also ==
- Éditions Larousse
- Grand Larousse encyclopédique

Volume	Year of publication	Topics covered
1	1866	A – Azzubeydi
2	1867	B – Bzovius
3	1867	C – Chemins de fer
4	1869	Chemin – Contrayerva
5	1869	Contre – Czyzowski
6	1870	D – Dzoungarie
7	1870	E – Ezzelin 1^{er}
8	1872	F – Gyzéh
9	1873	H – Ky-yn
10	1873	L – Memnonite
11	1874	Mémoire – Ozza
12	1874	P – Pourpointier
13	1875	Pourpre – Rzyszczewski
14	1875	S – Testadon
15	1876	Testament – ZZ
16	1877	Supplément: AA – Zuylen van Nyevelt
17	1890	Deuxième Supplément: AA – Zymprotéine
