= Claude Augé =

- Born: 31 October 1854; L'Isle-Jourdain
- Died: 22 July 1924 (aged 69); Fontainebleau
- Occupations: Publisher; Lexicographer; Pedagogue
- Spouse: Grandniece of Pierre Larousse's wife

Claude Augé (French: [klod o.ge]; 31 October 1854 – 22 July 1924) was a French pedagogue, publisher, and lexicographer.

== Biography ==
First a school master, he married a grand niece of Pierre Larousse's wife, joined the Librairie Larousse as bookkeeper in 1885 and became quickly one of the directors. Until his death, he continued to pursue the work of the famous lexicographer.

In 1920, while continuing his work, he chose to be replaced in his editorial functions, by his son Paul Augé.

== Personal works ==
- From 1891 to 1895: Cours d'histoire de France (levels: first grade, elementary and middle course), in collaboration with Maxime Petit. Works that have been republished many times until 1923.
- From 1890 to 1912 : Cours de grammaire in 4 volumes (from preparatory courses to higher education): this brilliant collection trained generations of French people (certificat d'étude; brevet élémentaire; brevet supérieur) until the eve of World War II.
- Around 1895: Le Livre de Musique. Many reprints until 1954.
- 1899: Boky fiomanana amin' ny tantaran' i Frantsa nation'i Claude Augé sy Maxime Petit, nadikan-d Razafimahefa ho teny malagasy... – Livre préparatoire d'histoire de France... translated into Malagasy by Razafimahefa... Paris : Larousse, (1899)
- 1905: le Cabinet de l'instituteur

== Editorship ==
- 1889: Dictionnaire complet illustré en 1 volume.
- 1897–1904: Nouveau Larousse illustré, in seven large volumes (plus 1 supplement in 1907) ("light" and completely redesigned successor of the Grand Dictionnaire Universel du XIXe by Pierre Larousse in fifteen volumes and two supplements. The Nouveau Larousse Illustré aimed at objectivity and scientific precision, absent in its predecessor (rigor in definitions, selection of relevant examples and especially introducing a rich high quality iconography for the time). This dictionary, which was a true publishing success, led the way by his encyclopedic design to contemporary dictionaries.)
- 1905: Petit Larousse illustré (successor of the Dictionnaire complet illustré) (It summarized in one volume what the Nouveau Larousse Illustré in 7 large volumes developed with extraordinary richness.)
- 1907 and 1908 : Larousse pour tous (2 volumes)
- 1910: Larousse classique illustré (New encyclopedic dictionary in one volume of more than 1100 pages with 4150 prints - 70 tables - 114 cards for "A dictionary without examples is a skeleton." It would give rise to numerous editions: for example eightieth edition in 1939 ...)
- 1922: Larousse universel (successor of the Larousse pour tous) (represented the family Larousse par excellence. Indeed, its 2-volume offered more developed information than the Petit Larousse while remaining accessible by its price, to a majority of families.)
- 1924: Nouveau Petit Larousse illustré.

== Periodical publication ==
- 1907–1957 : Larousse mensuel illustré
