= Larousse Gastronomique =

1938 book by Prosper Montagné

- 2001 hardback edition in its box
- Author: Prosper Montagné
- Language: French
- Subject: Culinary arts
- Genre: reference
- Publisher: Editions Larousse
- Publication date: 1938
- Publication place: France
- Media type: book
- Pages: 1087

Larousse Gastronomique (French pronunciation: [laʁus ɡastʁɔnɔmik]) is an encyclopedia of gastronomy first published by Éditions Larousse in Paris in 1938. The majority of the book is about French cuisine, and contains recipes for French dishes and cooking techniques. The first edition included few non-French dishes and ingredients; later editions include many more.

== Background ==
The first edition (1938) was edited by Prosper Montagné, with the collaboration of Dr Alfred Gottschalk, with prefaces by each of the author-chefs Georges Auguste Escoffier and Philéas Gilbert (1857–1942). Gilbert was a collaborator in the creation of this book as well as Le Guide Culinaire (1903) with Escoffier, leading to some cross-over with the two books. It caused Escoffier to note when he was asked to write the preface that he could "see with my own eyes", and "Montagné cannot hide from me the fact that he has used Le Guide as a basis for his new book, and certainly used numerous recipes."

The third English edition (2001), which runs to approximately 1,350 pages, has been modernized and includes additional material on other cuisines. It is also available in a concise edition (2003). A new, updated and revised edition was released in October 2009, published by Hamlyn in the UK.

== Bibliography ==
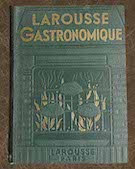
1st Edition Larousse Gastronomique (1938)

- Larousse Gastronomique, Prosper Montagné, maître cuisinier, avec la collaboration du docteur Gottschalk, Paris, Editions Larousse, 1938.
- 2001 2nd edition, ISBN 2-03-560227-0, with assistance from a gastronomic committee chaired by Joël Robuchon
- James, Kenneth. Escoffier: The King of Chefs. Hambledon and London: Cambridge University Press, 2002.

=== English translations ===
- Montagné, Prosper. Larousse gastronomique: the encyclopedia of food, wine & cookery, Ed. Charlotte Turgeon and Nina Froud. New York, Crown Publishers, 1961. The English translation of the 1938 edition. ISBN 0-517-50333-6
- Montagné, Prosper. Larousse Gastronomique: The New American Edition of the World's Greatest Culinary Encyclopedia. Edited by Jenifer Harvey Lang. New York: Crown, 1988. Second English edition.ISBN 0-609-60971-8
- Courtine, Robert. Larousse Gastronomique: the world's greatest cookery encyclopedia. London: Hamlyn, 1988. ISBN 0-600-32390-0
- Montagné, Prosper. Larousse Gastronomique: The New American Edition of the World's Greatest Culinary Encyclopedia, Ed. Jenifer Harvey Lang. New York, Crown Publishers, 1998. ISBN 0-517-57032-7
- Montagné, Prosper. Larousse Gastronomique: The World's Greatest Culinary Encyclopedia. Edited by Jenifer Harvey Lang. New York: Clarkson Potter, 2001. Third English edition. ISBN 978-0-600-62042-6
- Montagné, Prosper. Larousse Gastronomique: The World's Greatest Culinary Encyclopedia. Edited by Joël Robuchon. New York: Clarkson Potter, 2009. Fourth English edition. ISBN 978-0-307-46491-0
