= Encyclopedic dictionary =

Reference work of many short articles

Title page from the 1894 four volume version of Robert Hunter's The Encyclopædic Dictionary.

An encyclopedic dictionary is a reference work that typically includes many short listings, arranged alphabetically, and discussing a wide range of topics. Encyclopedic dictionaries can be general, containing articles on topics in many different fields; or they can specialize in a particular field, such as art, biography, law, medicine, or philosophy. They may also be organized around a particular academic, cultural, ethnic, or national perspective.

Historically, the term has been used to refer to any encyclopedic reference book (that is, one comprehensive in scope), which was organized alphabetically, as with the familiar dictionary (the term dictionary preceded encyclopedia in common usage by about two centuries). To convey their alphabetic method of organization and to contrast that method with other systems for classifying knowledge, many early encyclopedias were titled or sub-titled "a dictionary of arts and sciences" or something similar.

However, it later developed into a somewhat distinct class of reference books. While there are similarities to both dictionaries and encyclopedias, there are important distinctions as well:

- A dictionary is primarily focused on words and their definitions, and typically provides limited information, analysis of different forms, and an etymology (in more complete dictionaries) for the word defined. Hence, while it may offer a definition, it may leave the reader still lacking in understanding the meaning or import of a term, and how the term relates to a broader field of knowledge.
- An encyclopedia, on the other hand, seeks to discuss each subject in more depth and convey the accumulated knowledge on that subject. This characteristic is especially true of those encyclopedias with long monographs on particular subjects, such as the first ten editions of the Encyclopædia Britannica. While often organized alphabetically, some encyclopedias were not. Usually, more of the discussion may be organized around a field (such as law) or a topic (such as the Scottish enlightenment), and less on the alphabetic terminology related to that discussion. An encyclopedia also often includes many maps and illustrations, as well as bibliography and statistics.

Compared to a dictionary, the encyclopedic dictionary offers a more complete description and a choice of entries selected to convey a range of knowledge. Compared to an encyclopedia, the encyclopedic dictionary offers ease of use, through summarized entries and in some cases more entries of separate terms; and often reduced size, and the reduced publishing and purchase cost that implies.

The question of how to structure the entries, and how much information to include, are among the core issues in organizing reference books. As different approaches are better suited to different uses or users, all three approaches have been in wide use since the end of the 18th century.

The title of the volume may not be a good indication of which type of reference it is, as commercial concerns may have affected the publisher's selection of a title.

== History ==
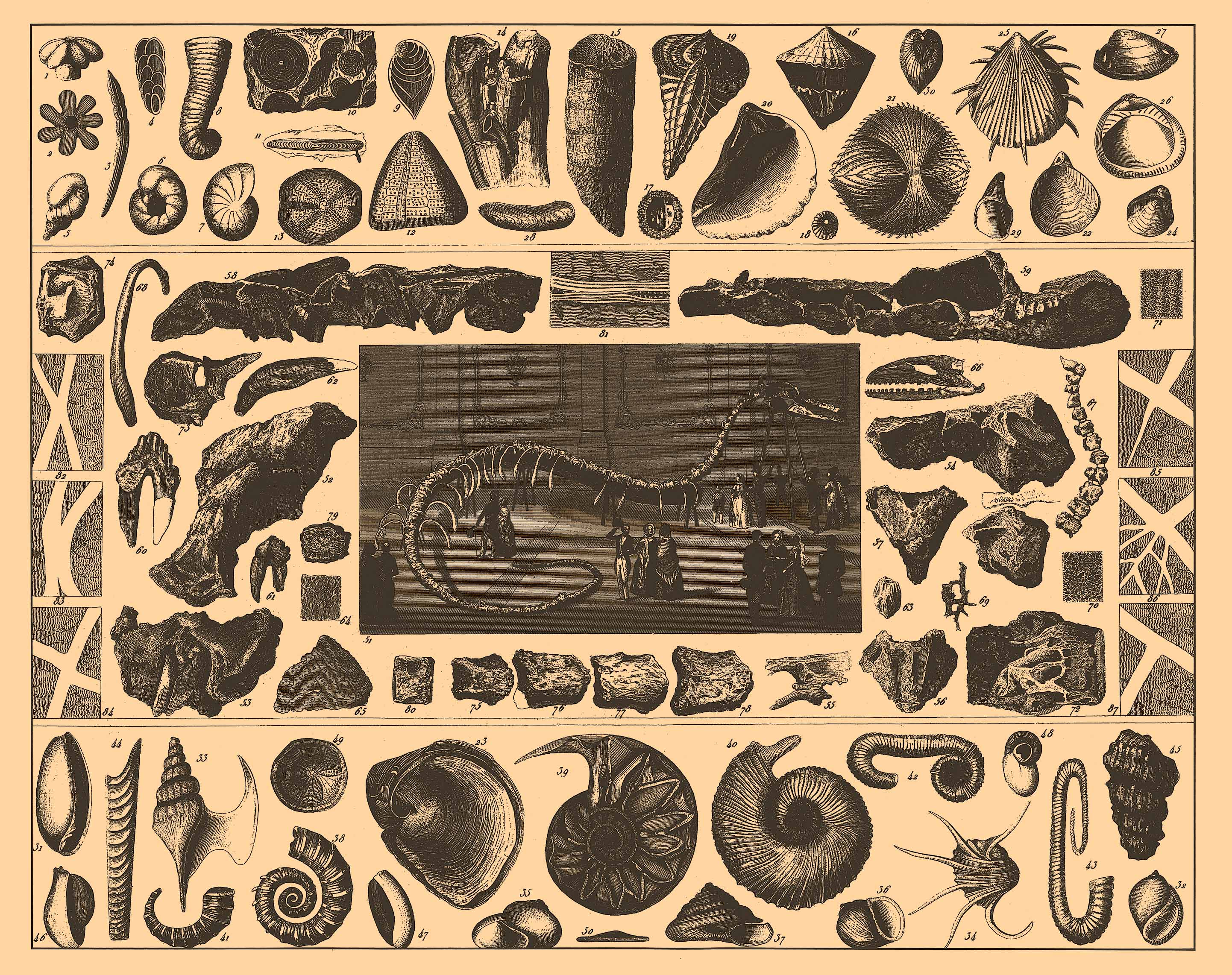
Illustration of fossils from Brockhaus and Efron's Encyclopedic Dictionary (1890—1907)

The encyclopedic dictionary evolved from the dictionary. John Harris subtitled his landmark Lexicon Technicum a "universal English dictionary of Arts and Sciences"; it was the first English-language, alphabetically ordered collection of knowledge.

The 18th-century encyclopedists, in turn, dramatically expanded the depth and, in some cases, substantially revised the organization of the encyclopedic dictionary to create the early major encyclopedias, the French Encyclopédie and later the British Encyclopædia Britannica. The flourish of encyclopedic dictionaries was mainly because of the pioneering Estienne family in France.

However, such comprehensive works were costly and difficult to produce, and to keep current; and the detailed entries were not ideal for some reference uses. The first version of the German Conversations-Lexikon (1796–1808) was just 2,762 pages in six volumes, and while that work was later expanded, its format using numerous, less lengthy entries served as the principal model for many 19th-century encyclopedias and encyclopedic dictionaries.

The principal English-language encyclopaedic dictionary of the nineteenth century was the seven-volume in 14 eponymous work by Robert Hunter (1823–1897), published by Cassell in 1879–88, and reprinted many times up to 1910, including (1895) as the mass-circulation Lloyd's Encyclopaedic Dictionary. Hunter was assisted by zoology author Henry Scherren and a small team of domestic assistants at his house in Loughton. In the US, the dictionary was reissued with a variety of titles.

== See also ==
- Lexicon Technicum by John Harris, an early encyclopedia published in 1704
- Cyclopaedia, or Universal Dictionary of Arts and Sciences by Ephraim Chambers, published in 1728
- Grand dictionnaire universel du XIXe siècle by Pierre Larousse
- The Century Dictionary, published from 1889 to 1891 by The Century Company of New York
