= Pierre Larousse =

French grammarian

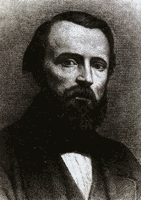
- Born: Pierre Athanase Larousse; October 23, 1817; Toucy, France
- Died: January 3, 1875 (aged 57); Paris, France
- Occupations: Grammarian, lexicographer, encyclopaedist

Pierre Athanase Larousse (French pronunciation: [pjɛʁ atanaz laʁus]; 23 October 1817 – 3 January 1875) was a French grammarian, lexicographer and encyclopaedist. He published many of the outstanding educational and reference works of 19th-century France, including the 15-volume Grand dictionnaire universel du XIXe siècle.

== Early life ==
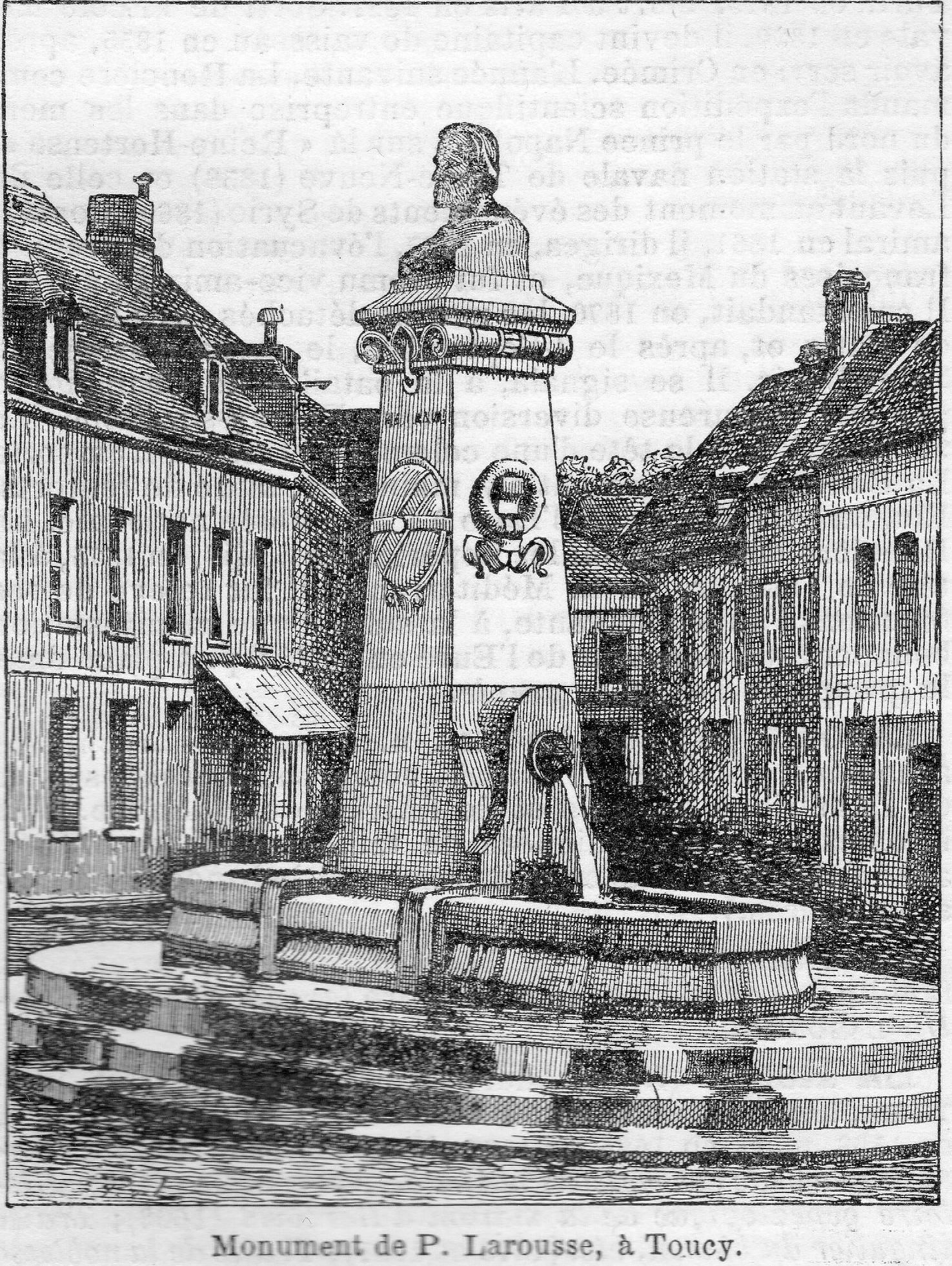
Monument to Pierre Larousse in his native town (early 20th century).

Pierre Larousse was born in Toucy, where his father was a blacksmith. At the age of sixteen he won a scholarship at the teaching school in Versailles. Four years later, he returned to Toucy to teach in a primary school, but became frustrated by the archaic and rigid teaching methods. In 1840 he moved to Paris to improve his own education by taking free courses.

== Career ==
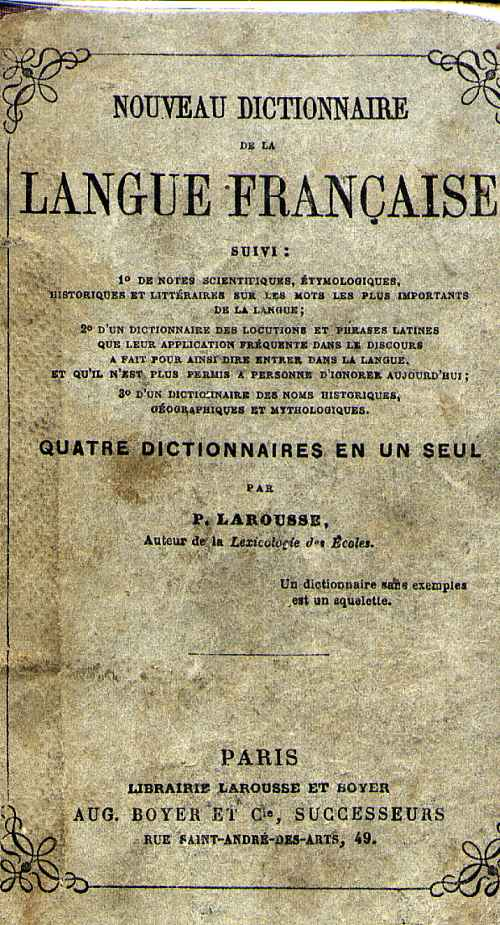
The cover of the first Larousse French dictionary in 1856

From 1848 to 1851, Larousse taught at a private boarding school, where he met his future wife, Suzanne Caubel (although they did not marry until 1872). Together, in 1849, they published a French language course for children. In 1851 he met Augustin Boyer, another disillusioned ex-teacher, and together they founded the Librairie Larousse et Boyer (Larousse and Boyer Bookshop). They published progressive textbooks for children, and instruction manuals for teachers, with an emphasis on developing the pupils' creativity and independence. In 1856 they published the New Dictionary of the French Language, the forerunner of the Petit Larousse, but Larousse was already starting to plan his next, much larger, project. On 27 December 1863 the first volume of the great encyclopedic dictionary, the Grand dictionnaire universel du XIXe siècle (Great Universal 19th-Century Dictionary), appeared. It was praised by Victor Hugo and became a classic. It is still highly respected in its modern revised form. In 1869 Larousse ended his partnership with Boyer and spent the rest of his life working on the Great Dictionary. The dictionary was finished (15 volumes, 1866–76; supplements 1878 and 1890), by Larousse's nephew Jules Hollier in 1876, after Larousse's death (in Paris in 1875) from a stroke caused by exhaustion.

== Publishing legacy ==
The publishing house Éditions Larousse still survives, but was acquired by Compagnie Européenne de Publication in 1984, Havas in 1997, Vivendi Universal in 1998, and the Lagardère Group in 2002. English-language variants of Éditions Larousse encyclopaedias were published for many decades by Hamlyn (publishers) and Prometheus Books.

== See also ==
- Bilingual dictionary
