= Southern French Gothic =

Architectural style

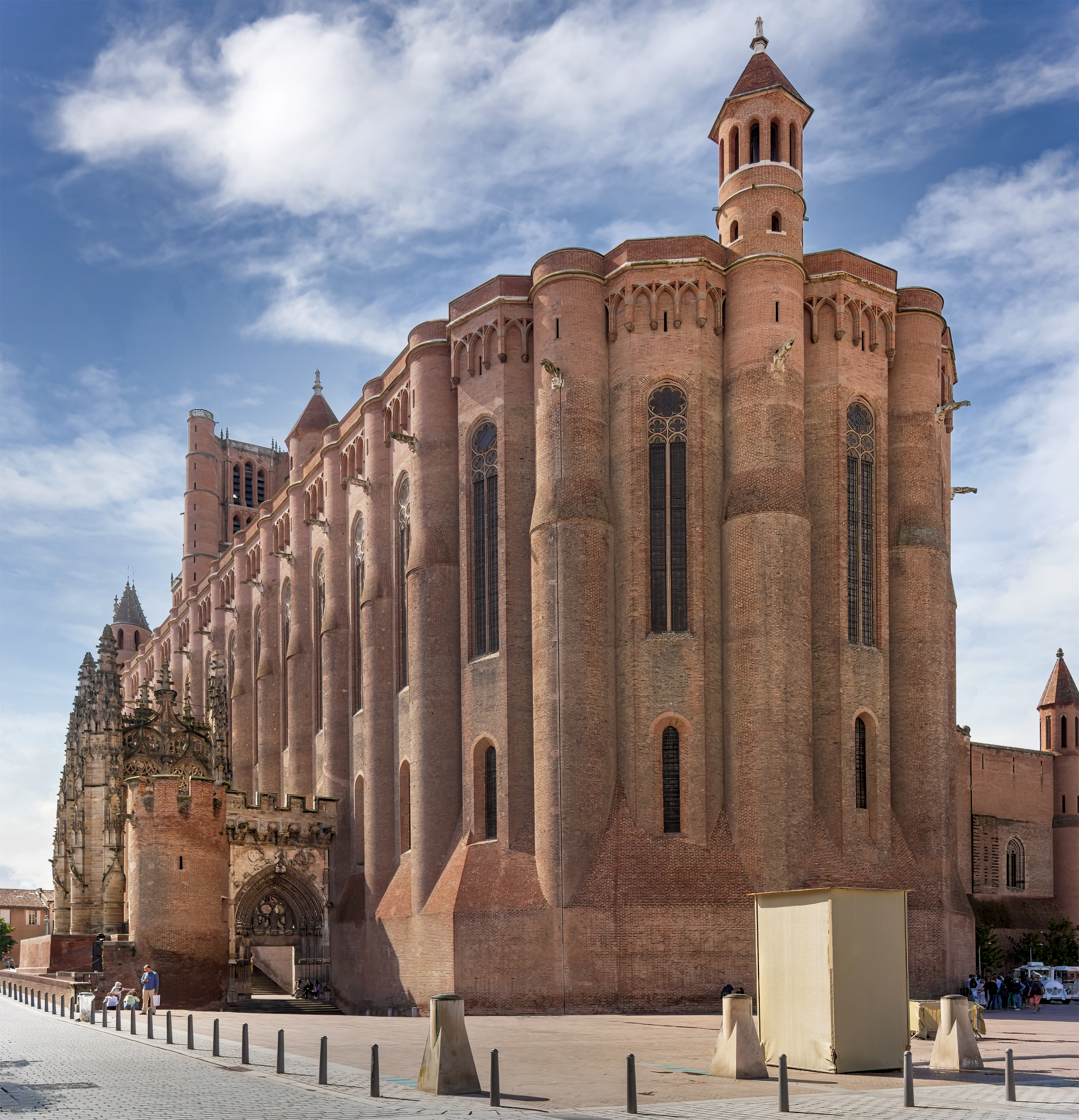
Albi Cathedral (begun 1282)

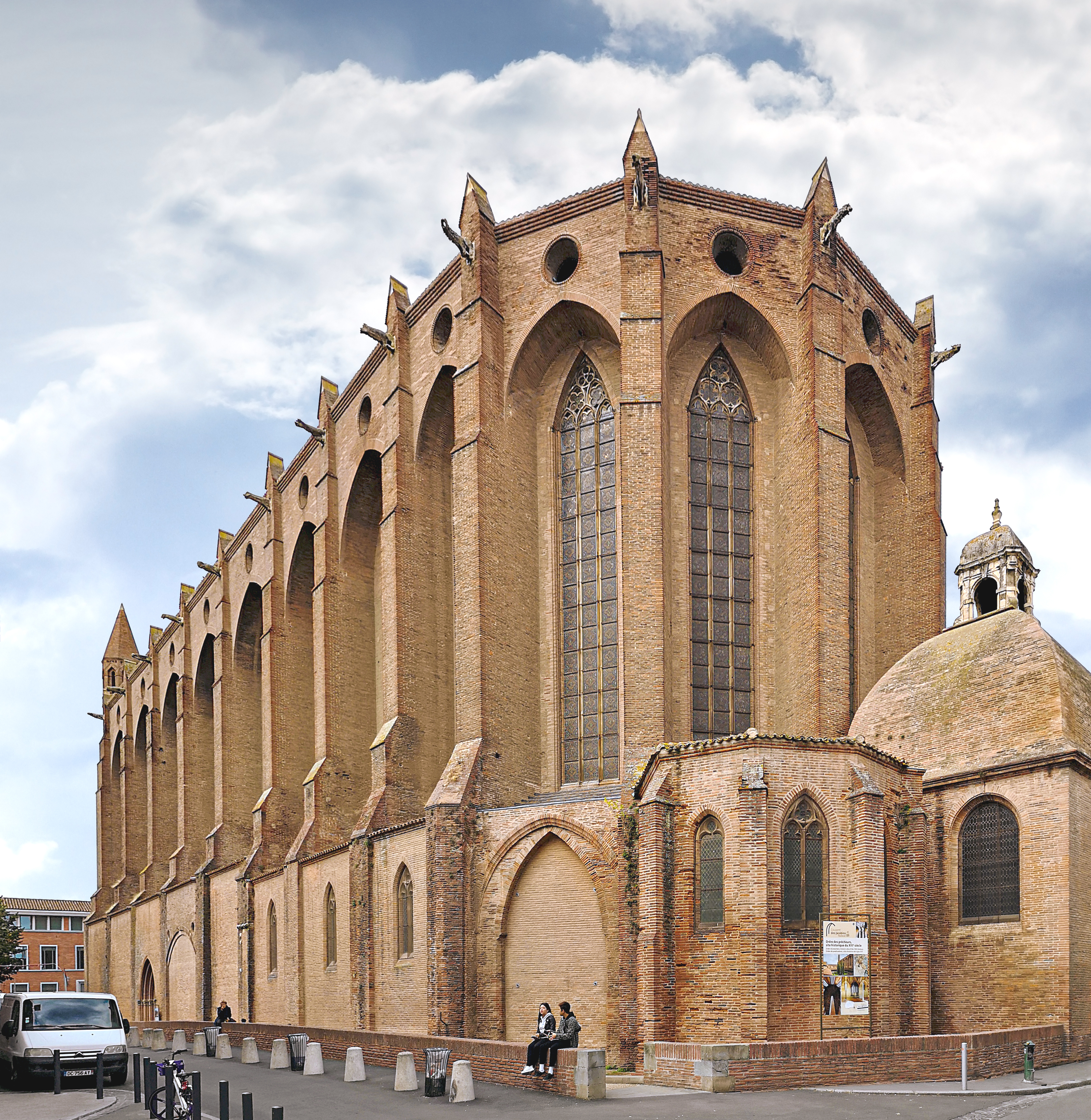
The Convent of the Jacobins in Toulouse (begun 1230, rebuilt 1245–92)

Southern French Gothic, or Meridional Gothic (French: gothique méridional; Occitan: gòtic meridional), is a specific and militant style of Gothic architecture developed in the South of France, especially in the Toulouse region. It arose in the early 13th century following the victory of the Catholic church over the Cathars, as the church sought to re-establish its authority in the region. As a result, church buildings typically present features drawn from military architecture. Taking into account the Cathars' criticism of the Catholic Church, Southern French Gothic is simpler and less ornate than northern French Gothic, and further differs in that the construction material is typically brick rather than stone. Over time, the style came to influence secular buildings as well as churches and spread beyond the area where Catharism had flourished.

== Origins ==
During the rise of Catharism, the luxury of the Roman Catholic Church faced constant criticism by the Cathar ecclesiastics. After the political eradication of the Cathar aristocracy during the Albigensian Crusade (1209–1229), the clergy of southern France understood that after having won the war, it was necessary for them to win back the minds of the populace. The ideology of Medieval Inquisition was reflected in the adoption of a more austere and uncluttered architectural style.

It is quite interesting to note that the same criticisms were made again a few centuries later with the rise of Protestantism, and that the reaction then adopted by the Roman Catholic Church was completely different since it gave rise to the exuberant decorative richness of the Baroque architecture.

== Geographical area ==
Southern French Gothic, as its name suggests, is found in the southern part of France, mainly in the regions where Catharism had developed, and which were subjected to religious and military repression from the North. The reconquest by the Catholic hierarchy gave rise to the construction or reconstruction of many religious buildings, but also of secular ones. The regions concerned are therefore the current départements of the Haute-Garonne (Toulouse), the Tarn (Albi), the Tarn-et-Garonne (Montauban), the Ariège, the Gers, the Aude, the Pyrénées-Orientales, the Hérault, with instances in neighboring départements as well.

== Characteristics ==
Southern French Gothic is characterized by the austerity of the constructions, such as the use of solid buttresses rather than flying buttresses, while the openings are few and narrow. Romanesque architecture persisted for longer in the south of France than in the north, and the transition to Gothic was gradual. Many of the buildings in the Southern Gothic style are thus built with a single nave, and roof-frames resting on diaphragm arches cover them.

=== Brick construction ===
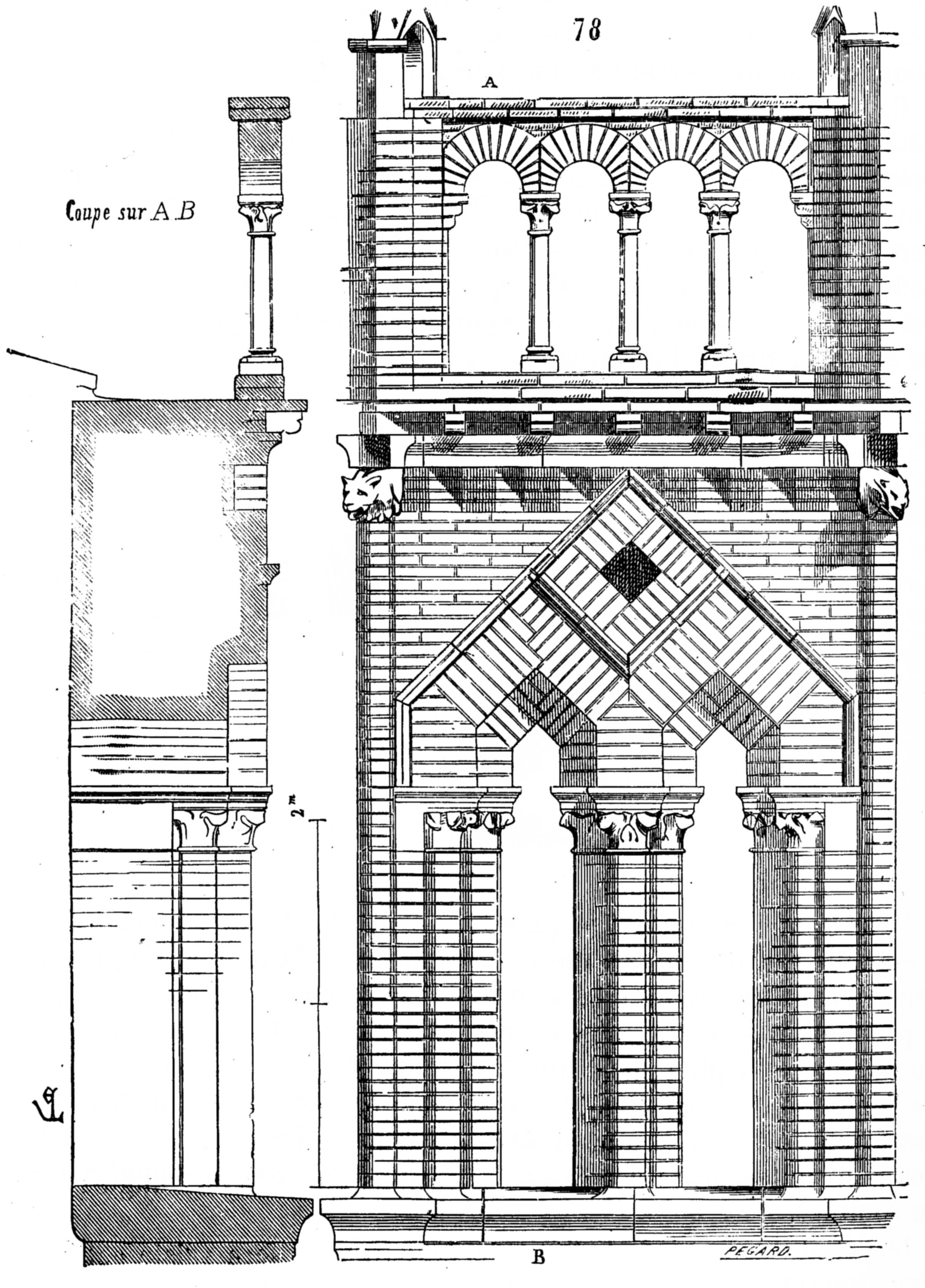
Bell Tower of the Jacobins of Toulouse, illustration from the Dictionary of Viollet-le-Duc

In an area poor in stone, the typical construction material was brick, whose use in the Southern French Gothic of the regions of Toulouse, Montauban and Albi became one of its distinguishing marks. The builders used techniques adapted to this material, such as the miter arches typical of this style. Brick lends itself to geometric decorative compositions, and consequently, there are few sculptures integrated into the architecture. Depending on the type of clay used, the bricks can be molded or rounded by abrasion. Some buildings use stone sparingly to create color contrasts.

Neighboring regions were coming under this influence but dominated by stone construction often adopted the same architectural vocabulary.

=== Single nave ===
After the Cathar episode, one goal of the Catholic Church was the recovery of the faithful through preaching (hence the foundation by Dominique de Guzmán of the order of the Friars Preachers). To this end, the preference was for the single nave, which promotes acoustics and places all the faithful under the gaze of the preacher. The nave is lined with side chapels, lodged between the buttresses, and surmounted by large windows that illuminate it. The very first example of Southern French Gothic architecture is the nave of the Toulouse Cathedral, built from 1210 to 1220 and probably the widest nave in Western Europe at its completion (19 metres wide), from which architectural research will then follow in the city's mendicant convents.

However, the presence of a single nave is not necessarily related to this desire but may be connected to other considerations such as a single pre-existing nave. Conversely, the vast nave of the Jacobins of Toulouse is divided by a row of pillars but is nevertheless a single entity. There, the grafting of a single apse of polygonal plan on a church with two vessels gave birth to a starry vault whose complex organization anticipated more than a century on the Flamboyant Gothic. Tradition refers to this masterpiece as "palm tree", because the veins gush out of the smooth shaft of the column like palm trees.

Another jewel of Southern French Gothic, the cathedral of Albi took two centuries to build, from 1282 to 1480, but it was to be completed by 1390. Its unusual dimensions for a Southern French Gothic building (interior length: 100 metres, interior width: 30 metres, height of the vaults: 30 metres) and its slightly later completion make it a unicum within its family. In opposition to the party developed for the Jacobins and in the rest of the region, the master of Albi preferred to reinforce the overall unity of the construction, minimising breaks in the plan, reducing the horizontal division of the volume and softening the rhythm of the ship's bays. The architect of Albi had the skill to place the buttresses inside the wall, giving them a cylindrical shape towards the outside.

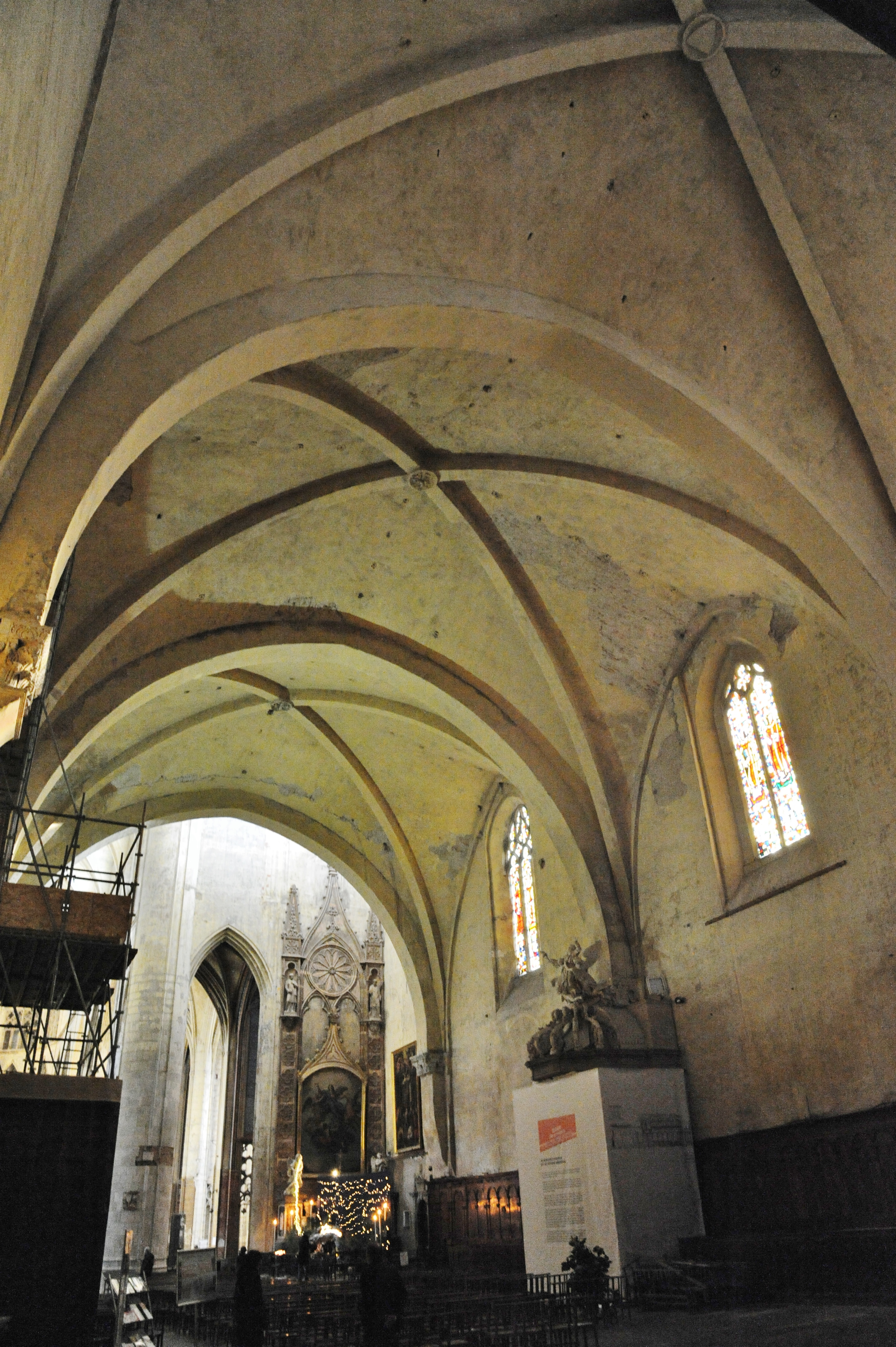
Nave of the Toulouse Cathedral

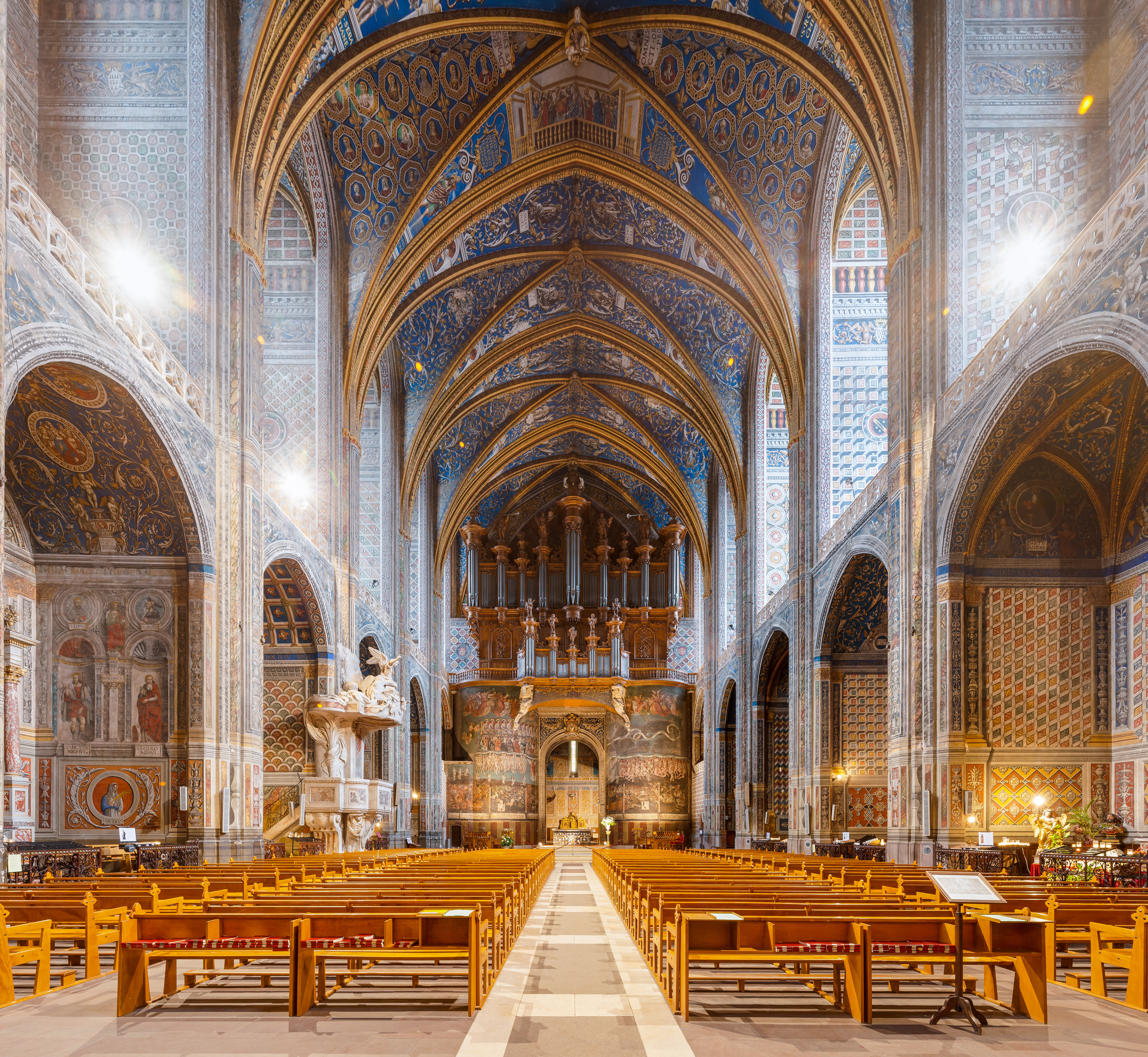
Albi Cathedral

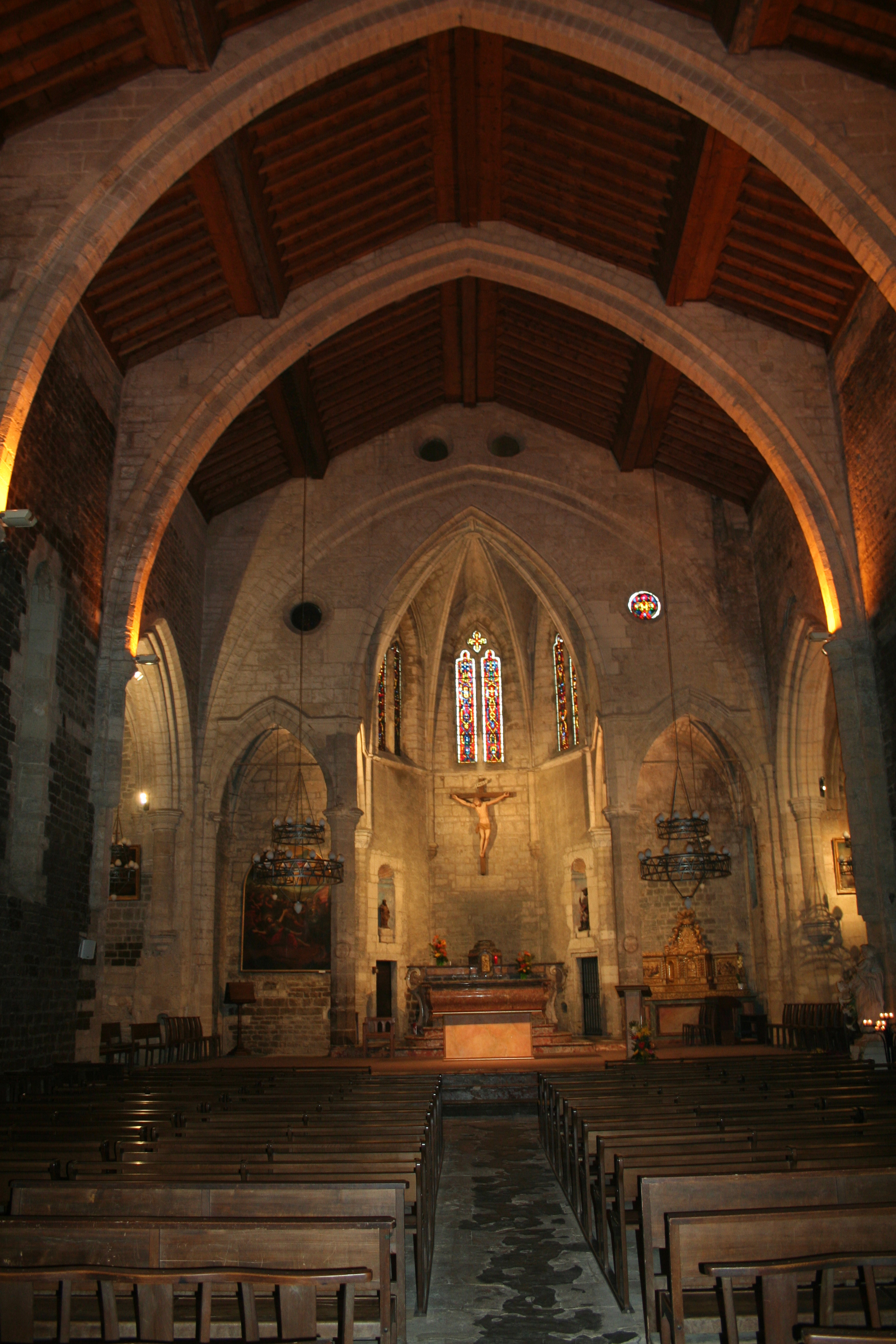
Church of Saint-Paul, Frontignan

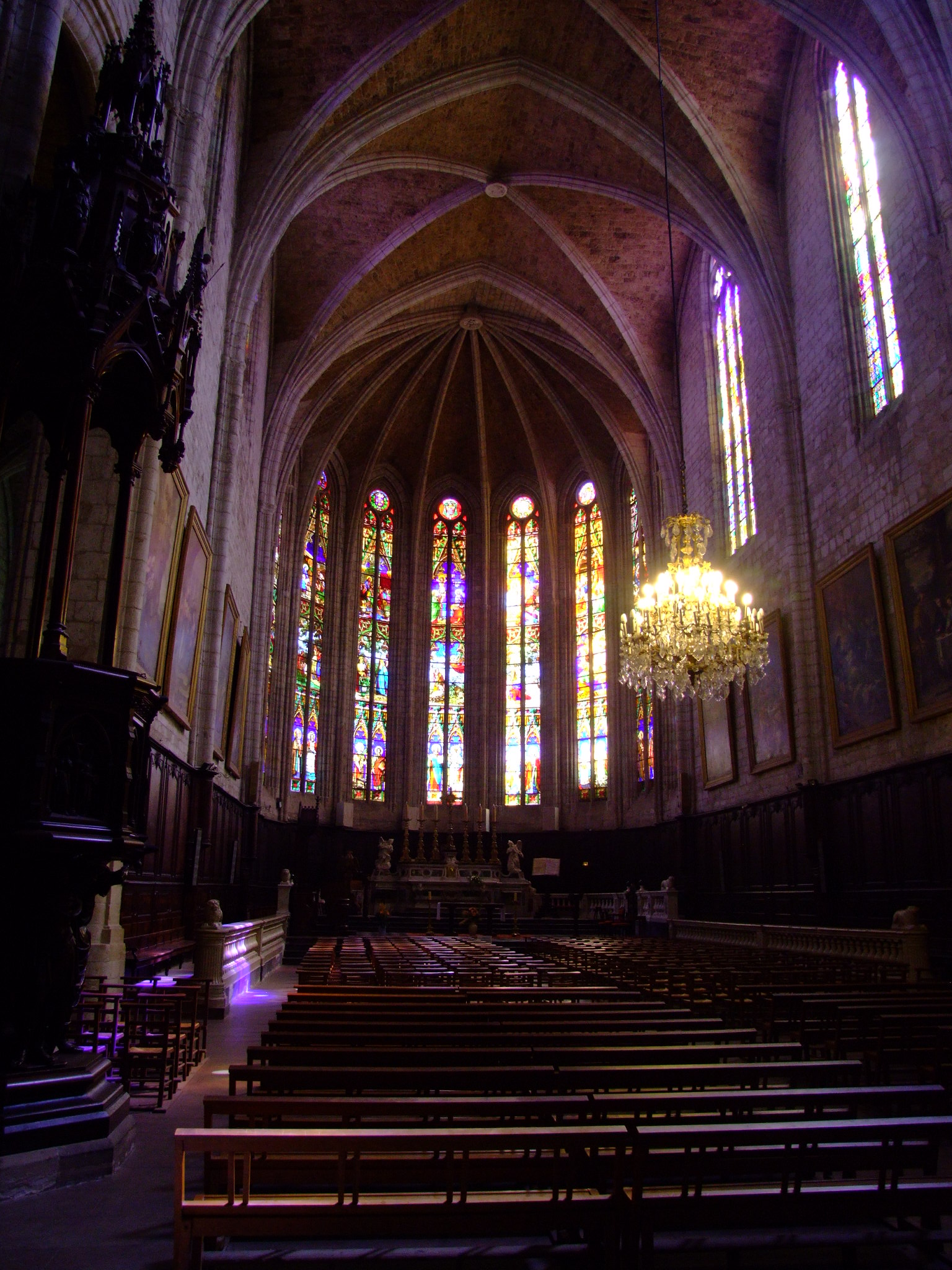
Lodève Cathedral

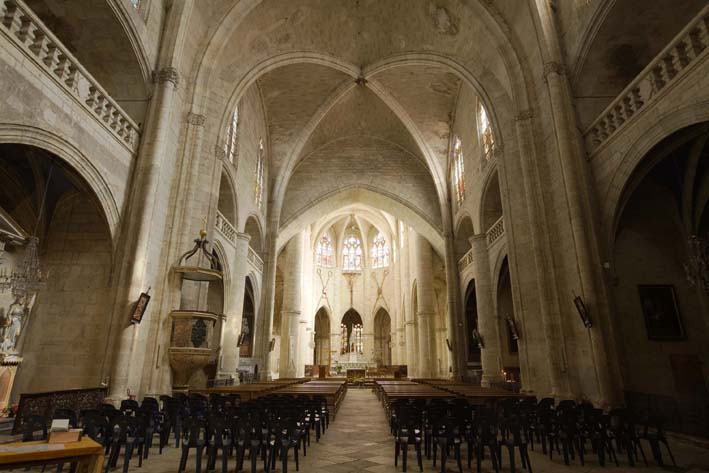
Lectoure Cathedral

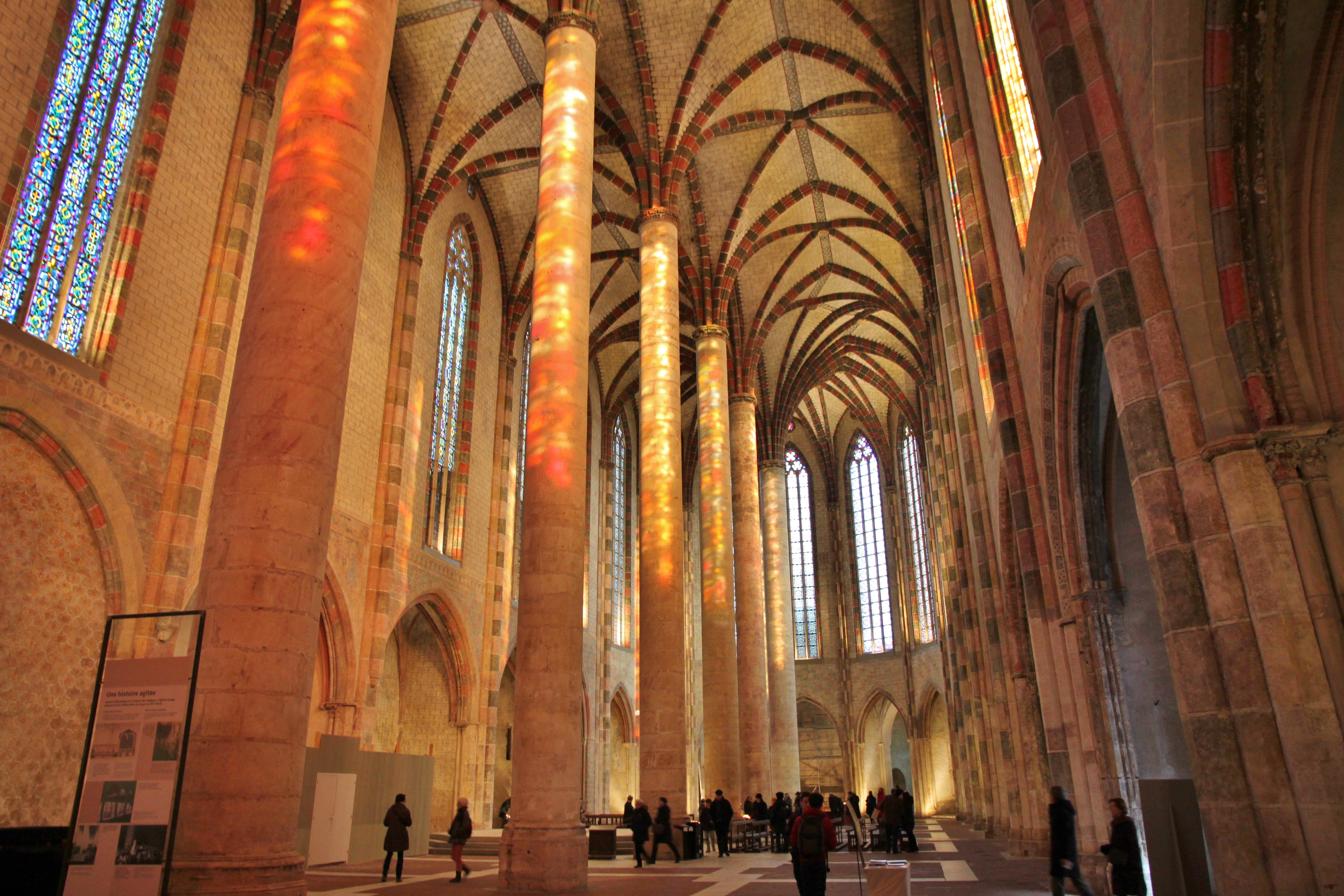
Church of the Jacobins, Toulouse

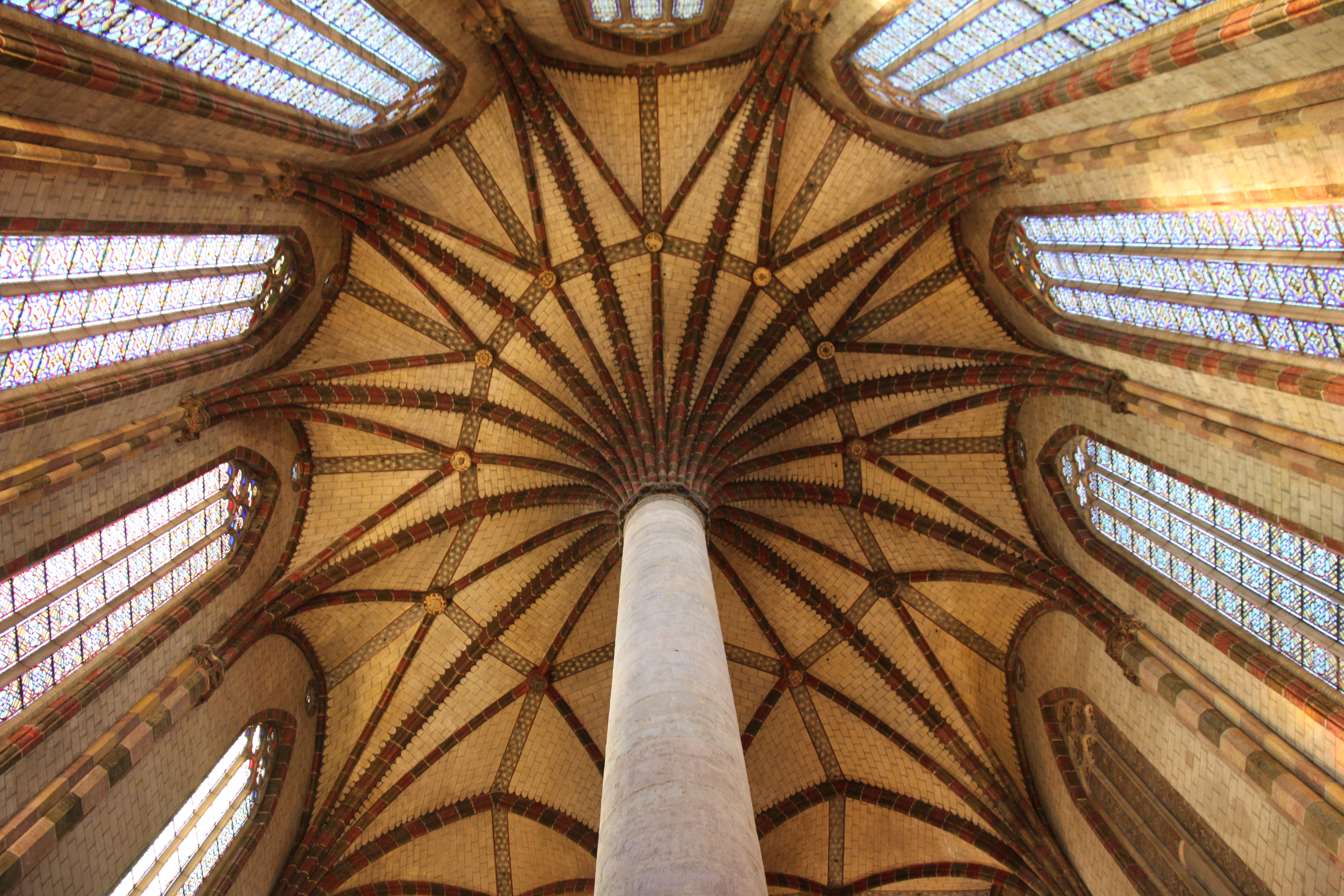
The Palm Tree of the Jacobins church, 28 meters high (Toulouse, 1292)

=== Bell tower ===
The bell towers can be of all types, but two forms stand out: the "Toulouse" bell tower and the wall belfry.

==== Octagonal "Toulouse" bell tower ====
In the Toulouse region, the typical bell tower appeared in the Romanesque period, with an octagonal floor plan and stories progressively decreasing in size. In the transition to Gothic, only the shape of the bays changed. Bell towers are usually surmounted by a spire, but a certain number of these are missing, either because they have been destroyed, or because the construction was interrupted. The first and typical example is the bell tower of Saint-Sernin of Toulouse, enhanced in the Gothic period with miter arches succeeding circa 1270 the Romanesque arched windows, but there are also ogival bays.

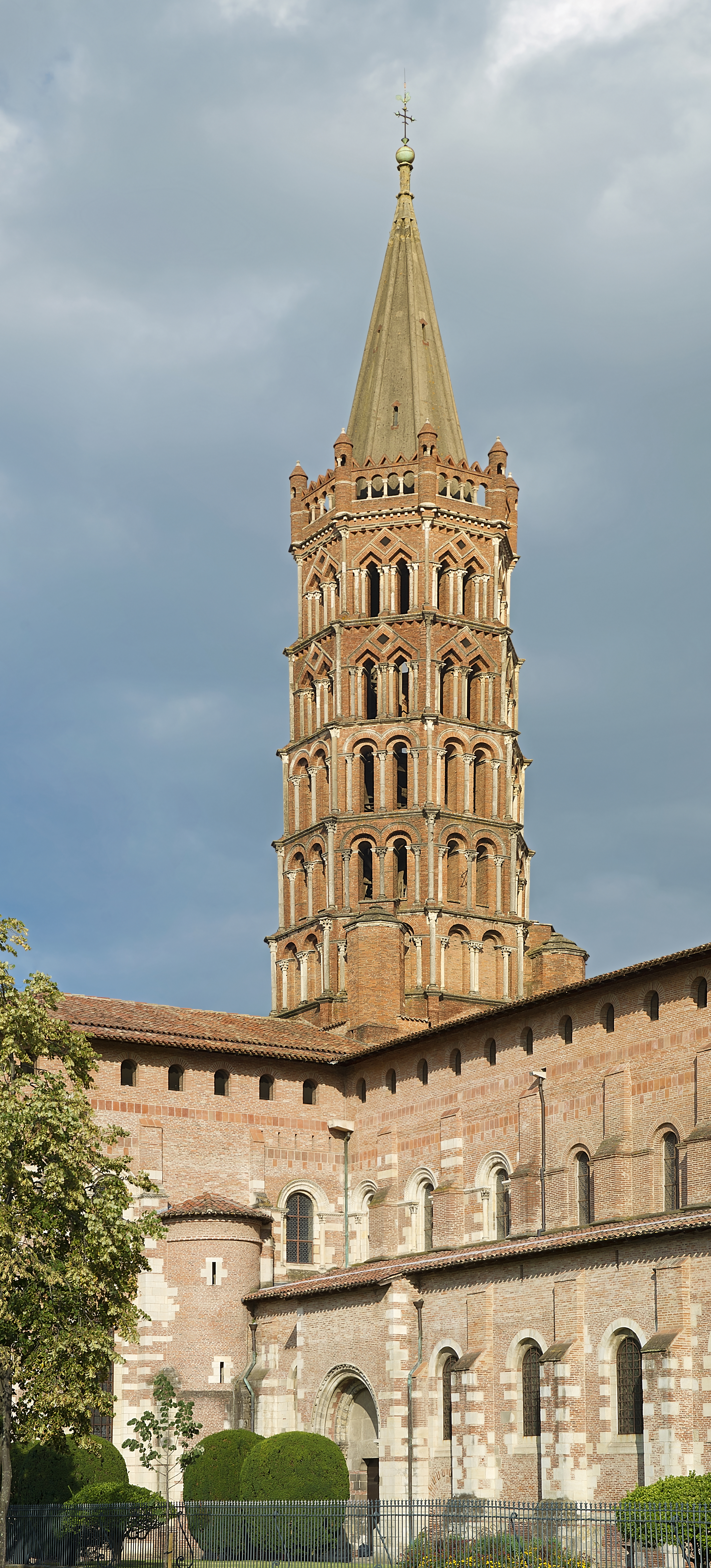
Basilica of Saint-Sernin, Toulouse

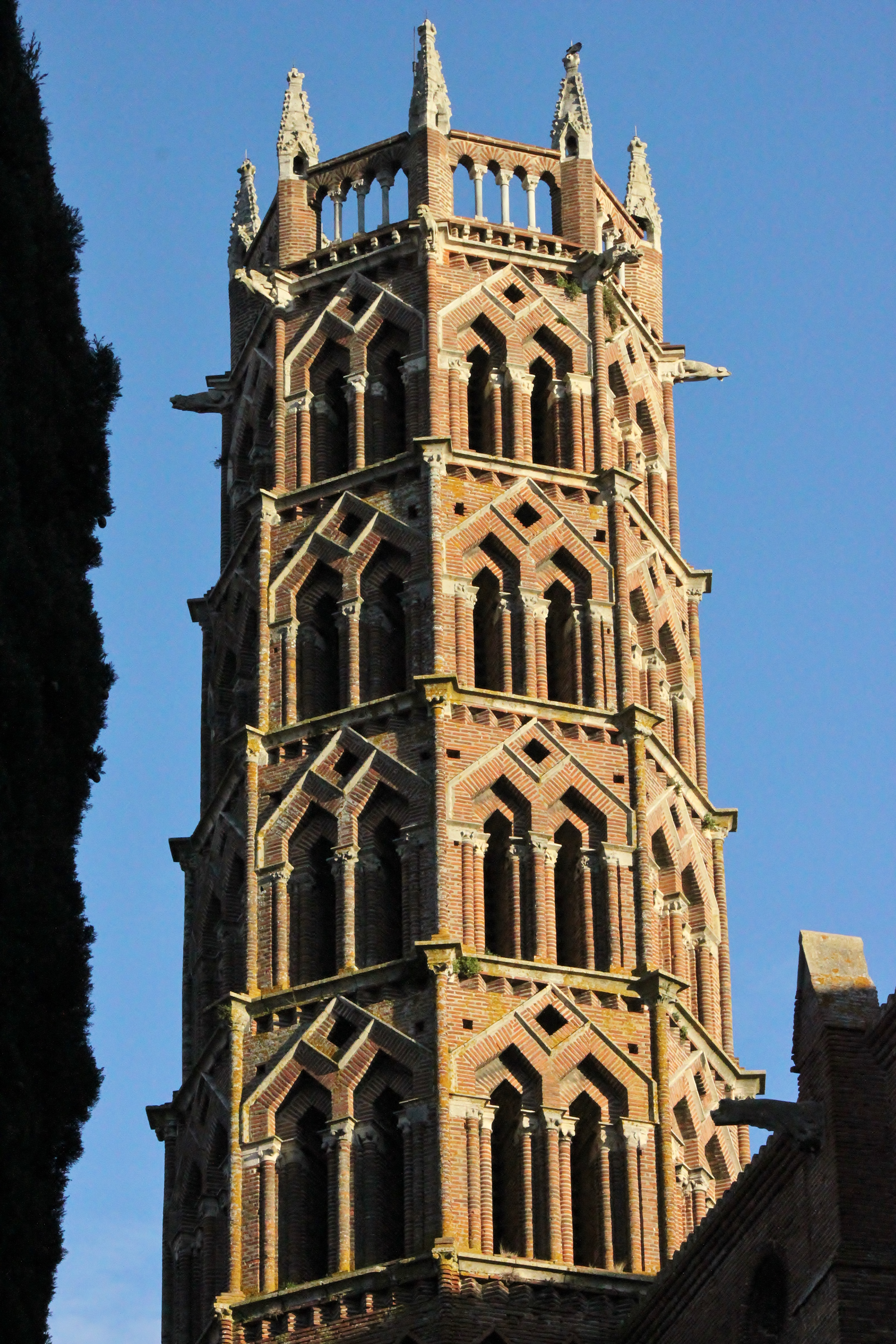
Church of the Jacobins, Toulouse

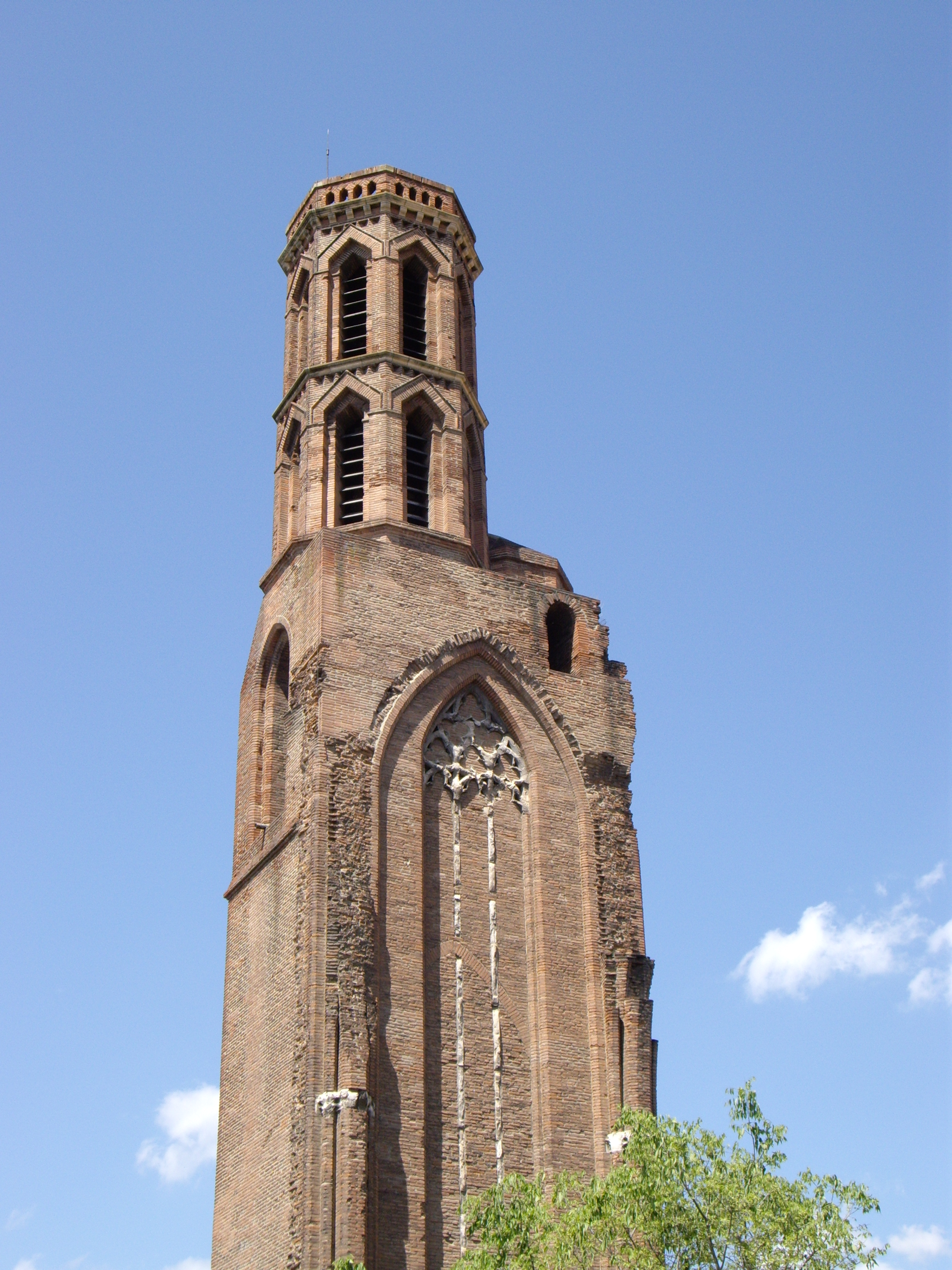
Church of the Cordeliers, Toulouse

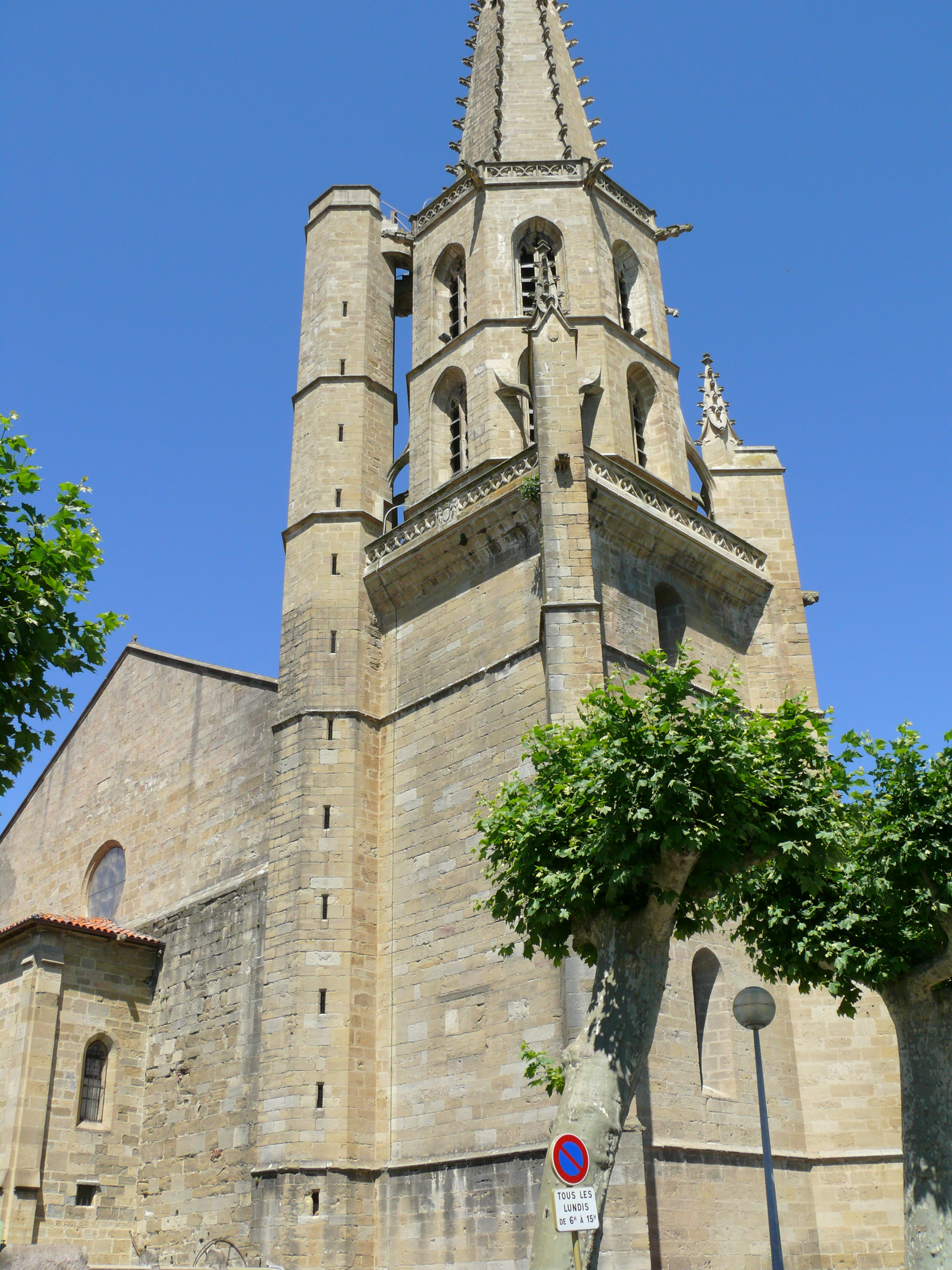
Mirepoix Cathedral

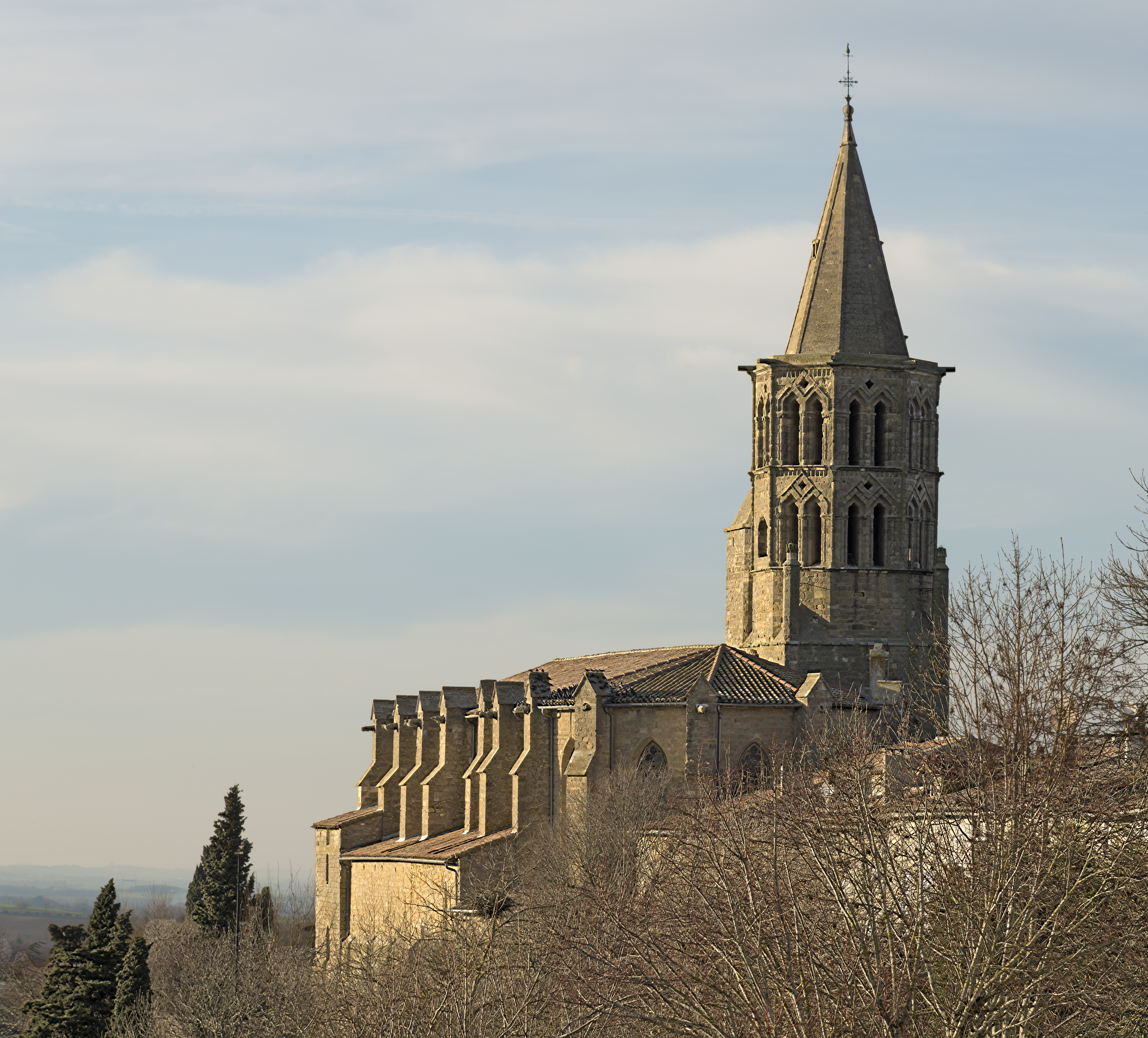
Church of Saint-Félix, Saint-Félix-Lauragais, built of stone

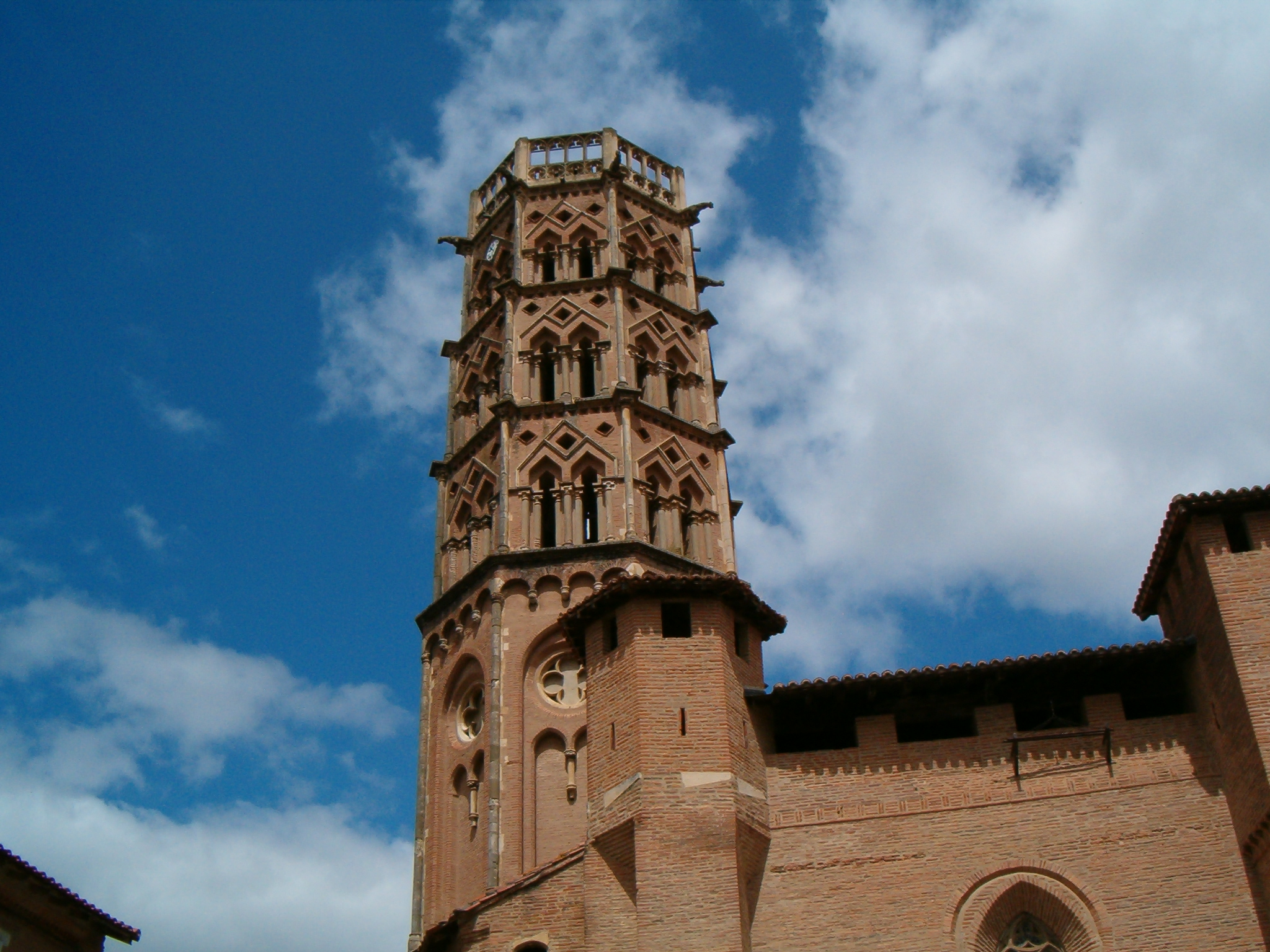
Rieux Cathedral

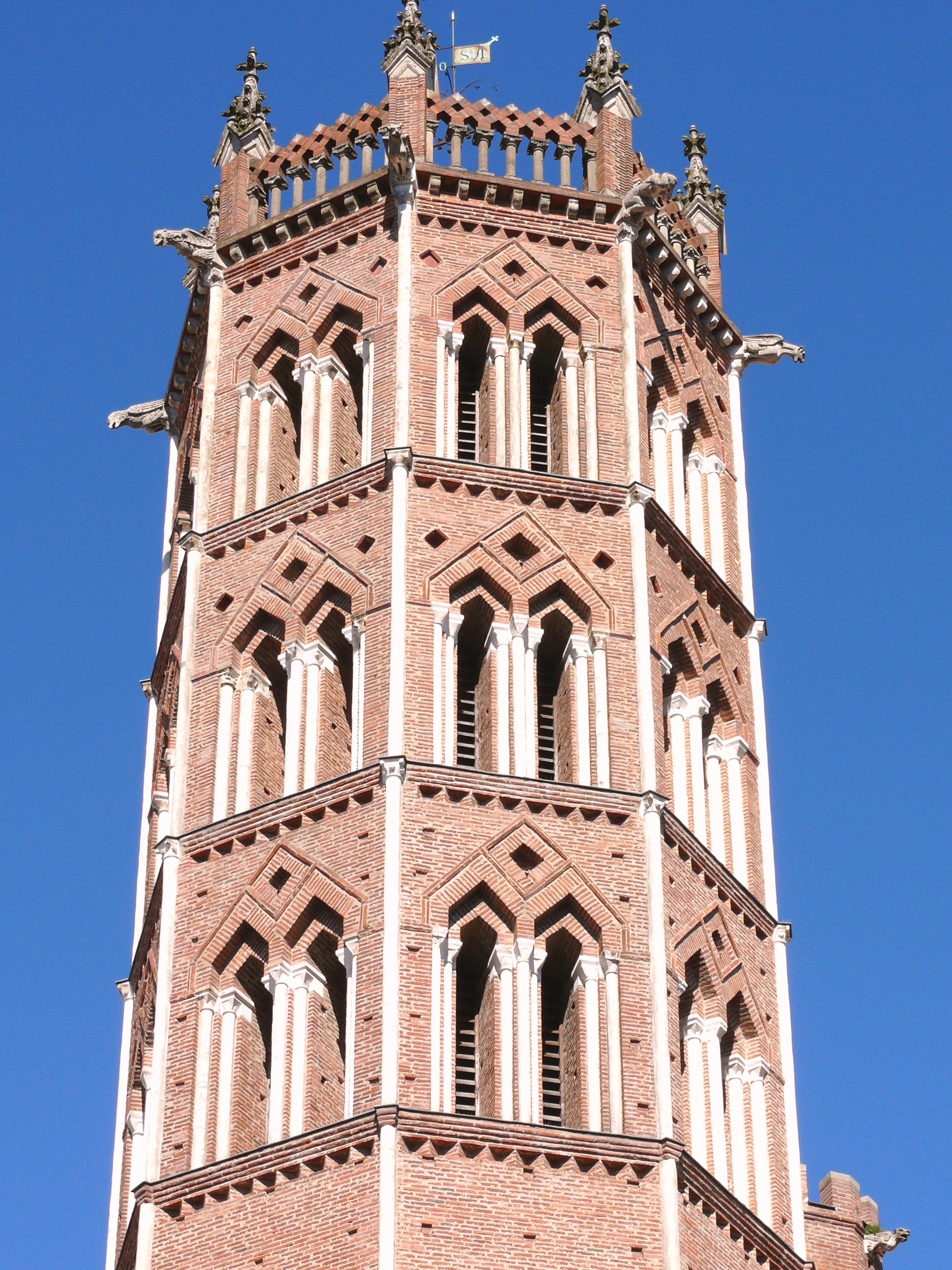
Pamiers Cathedral

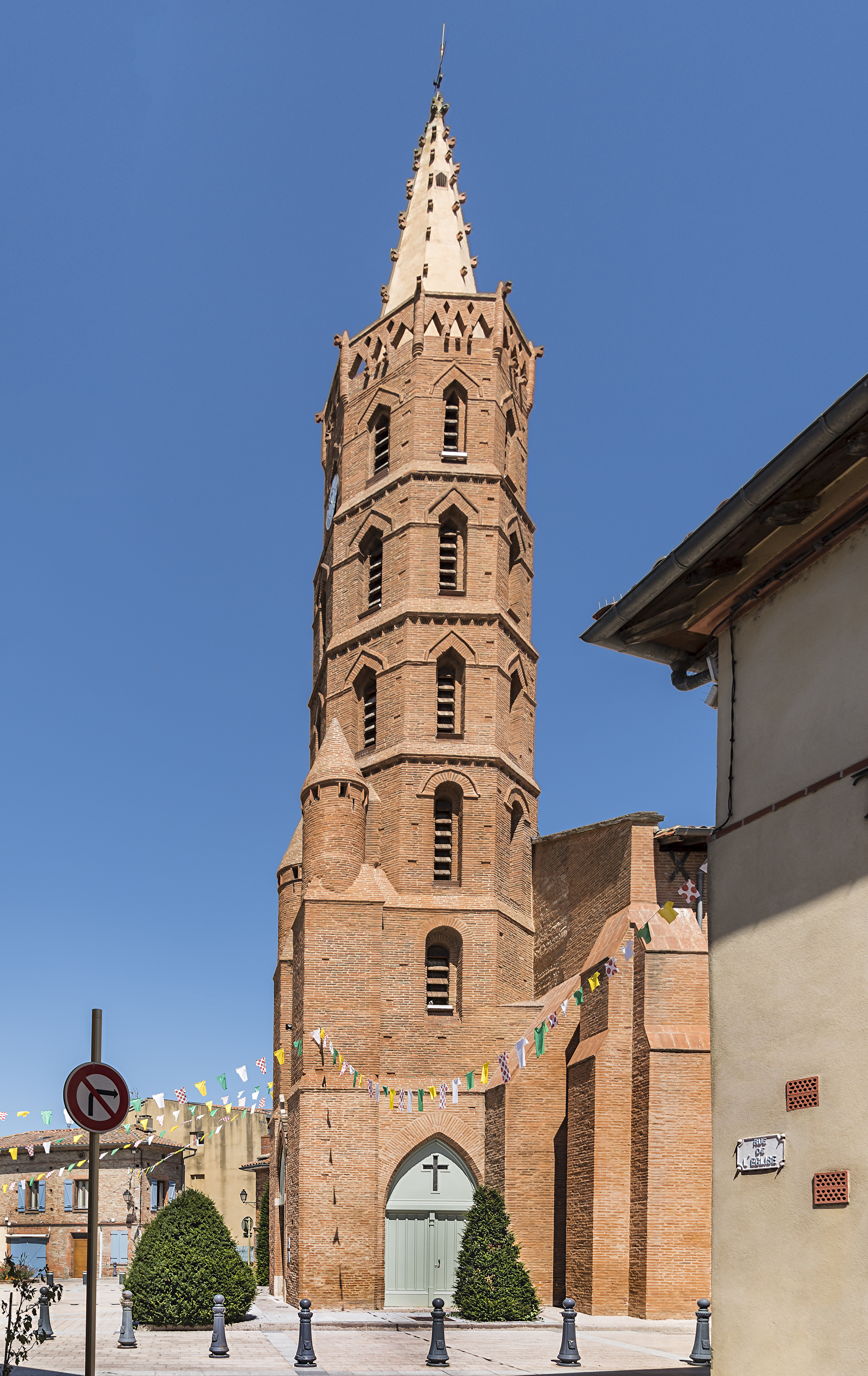
Church of Saint-Pierre, Blagnac

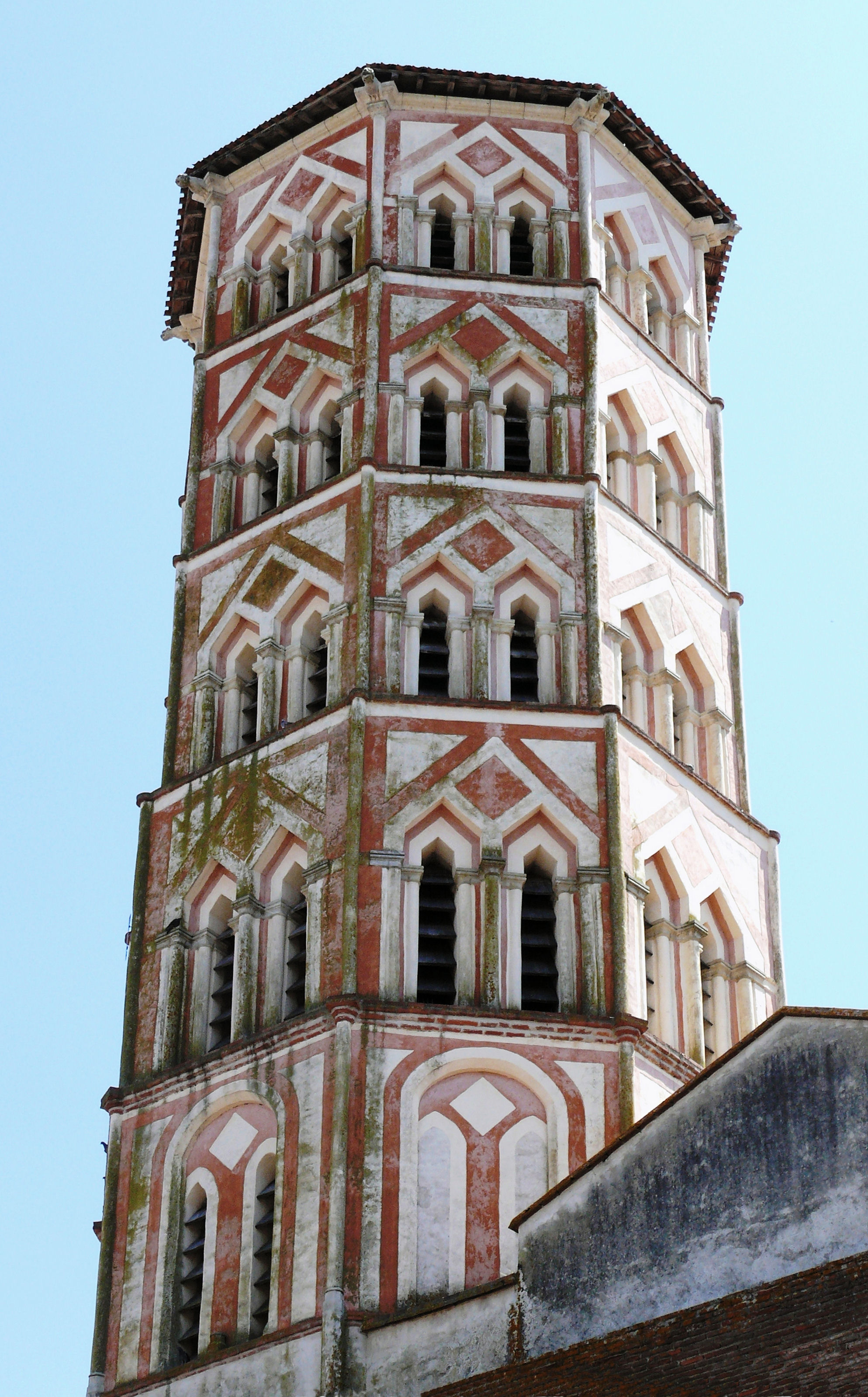
Lombez Cathedral

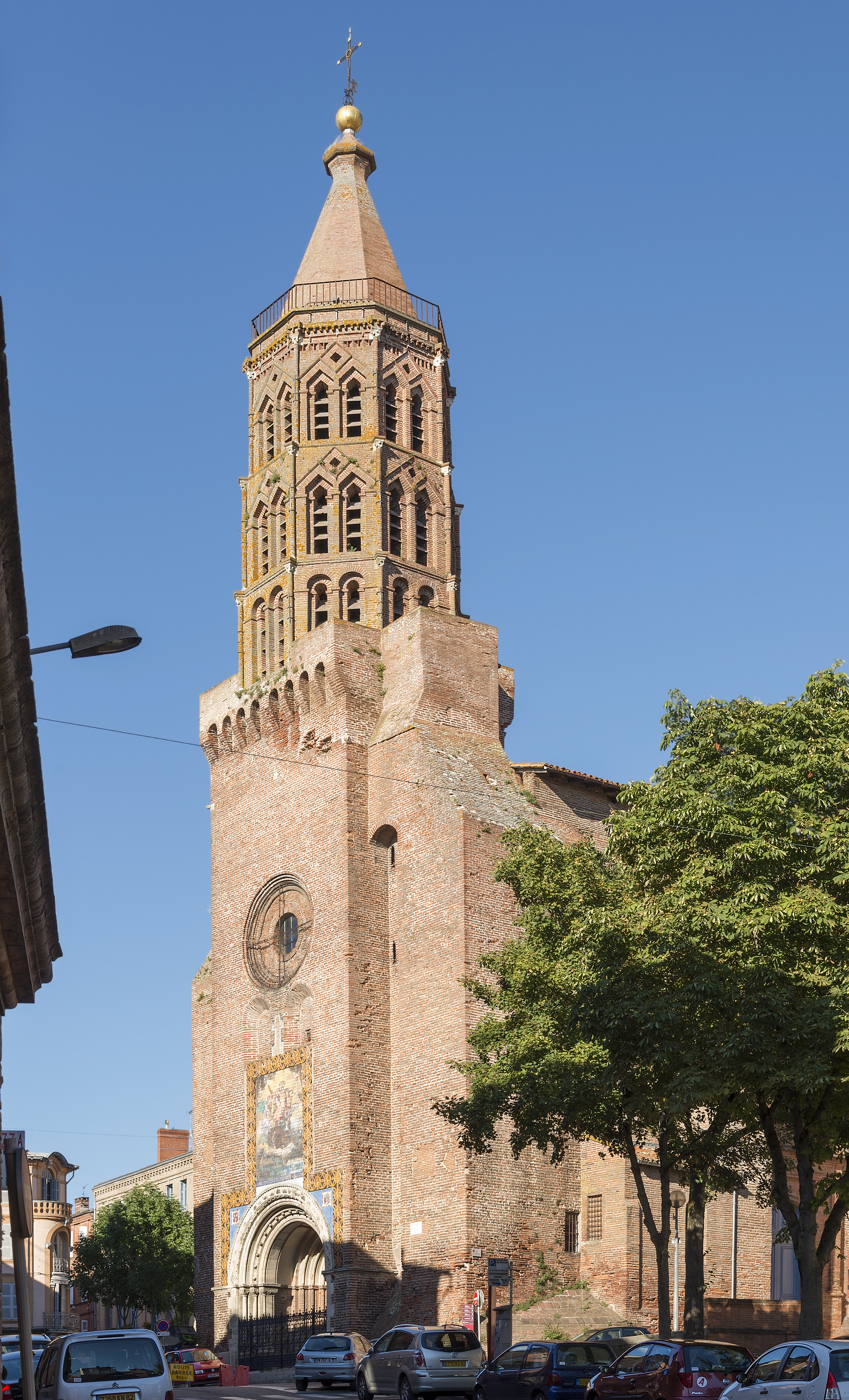
Church of Saint-Jacques, Montauban

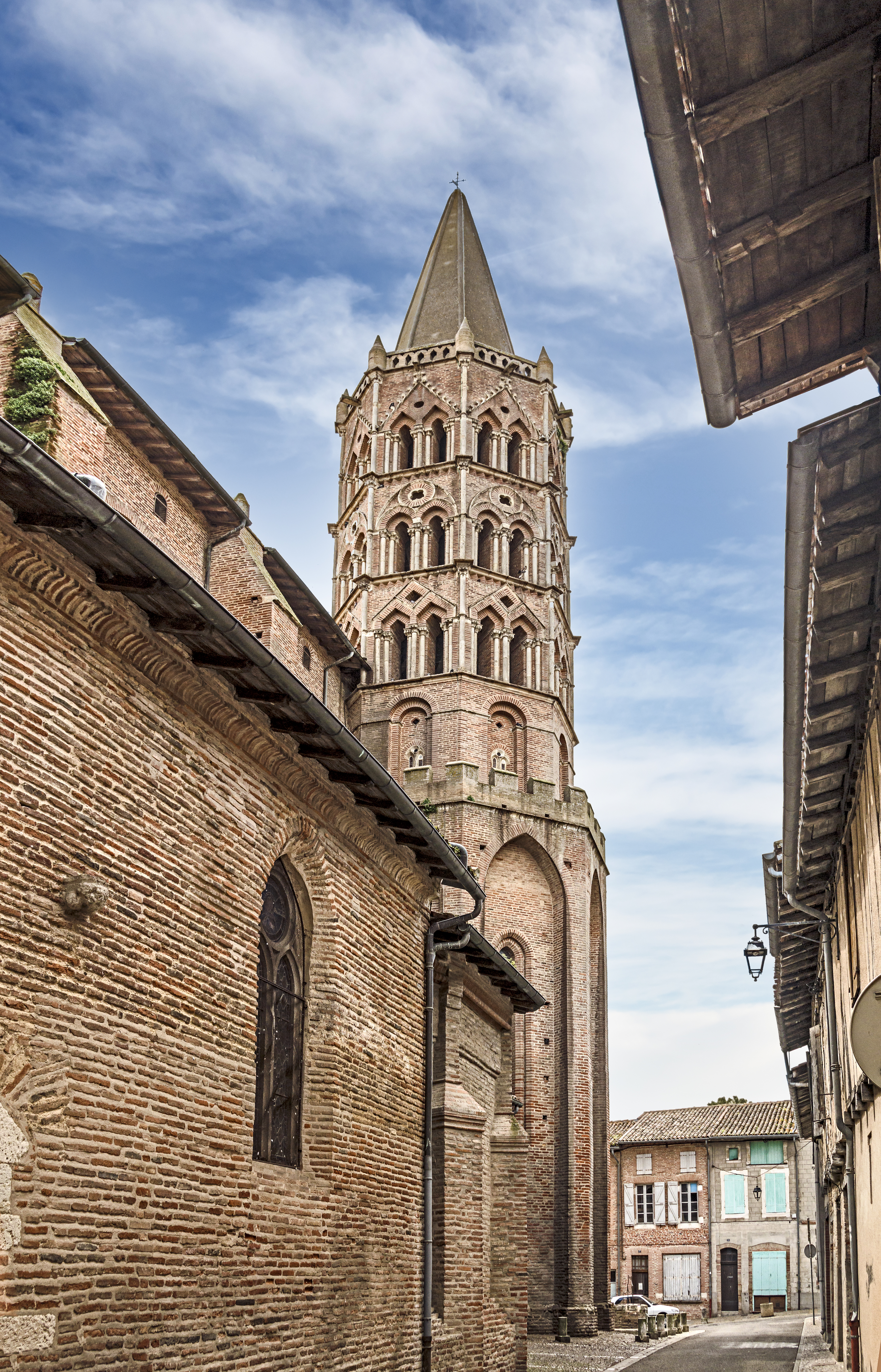
Church Notre-Dame-de-l'Assomption, Beaumont-de-Lomagne

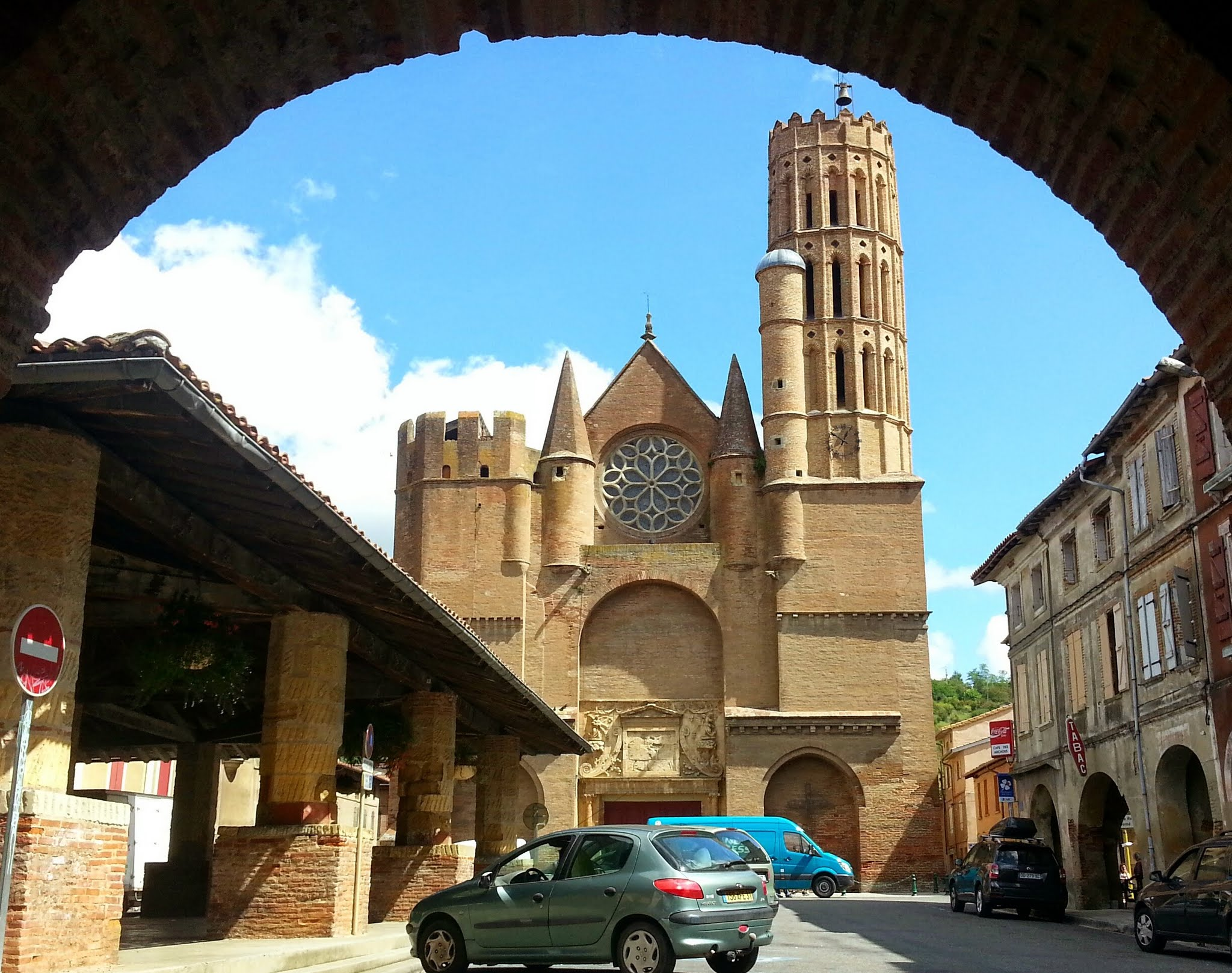
Church Saint-Victor, Montesquieu-Volvestre, with a rare example of a 16-sided bell tower

==== Wall belfry ====
The other form of the bell tower, more common in smaller buildings, is the wall belfry, also frequently characterized by miter arches, and often resembling fortifications in having elements such as battlements and machicolations. Here again the first model was a church in Toulouse: Notre-Dame du Taur.

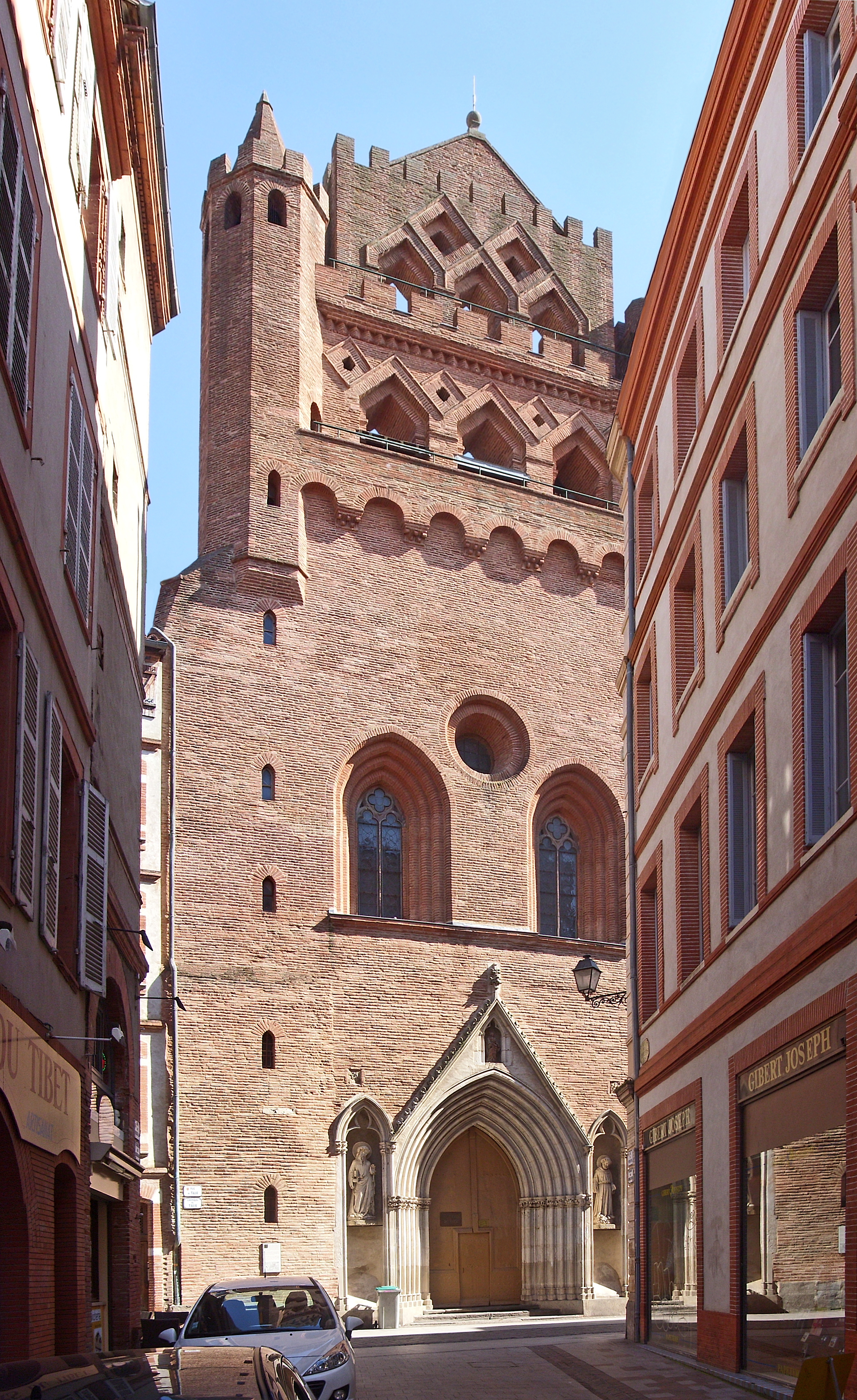
Church of Notre-Dame du Taur, Toulouse

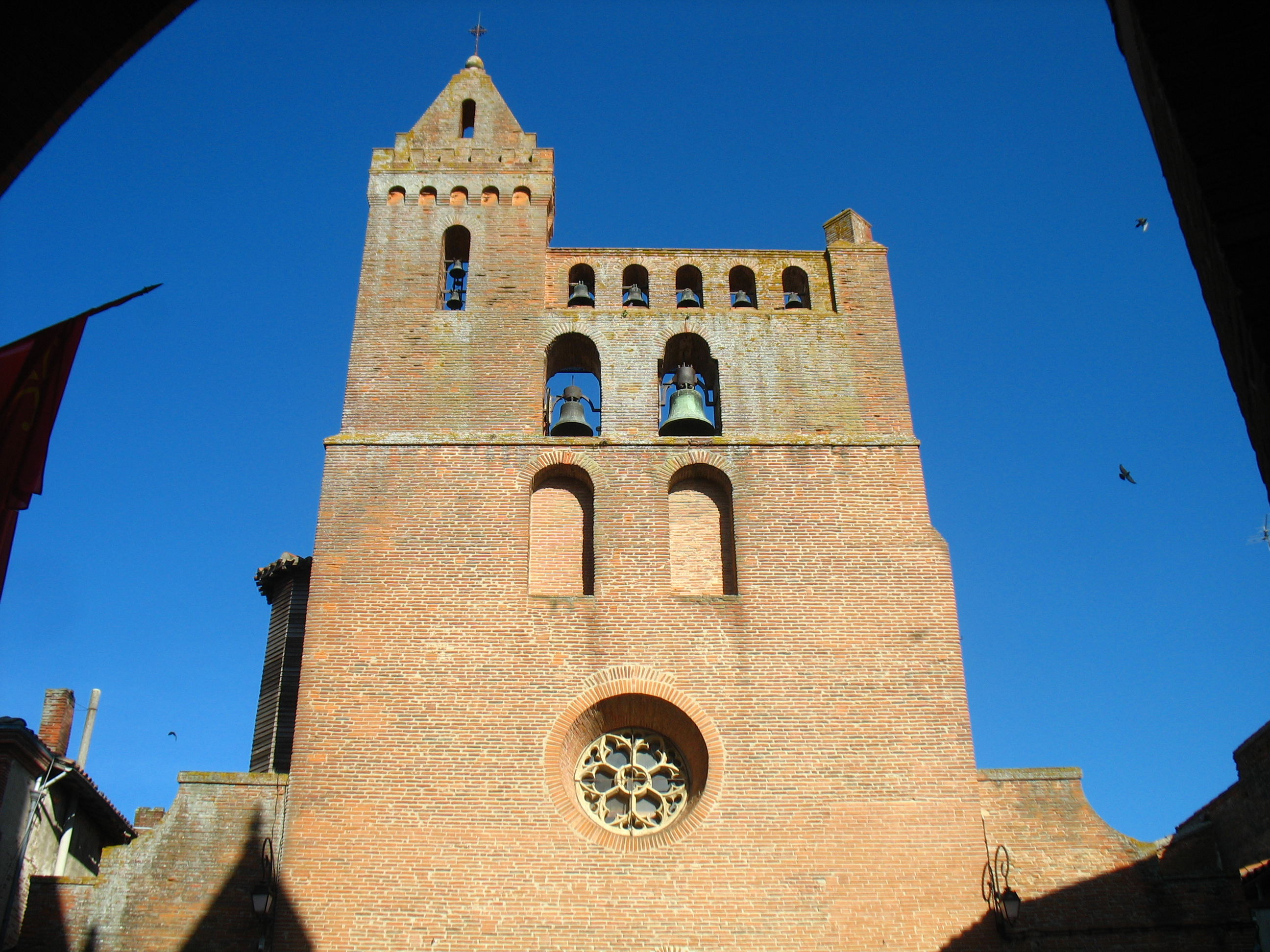
Church of Saint-Paul, Auterive

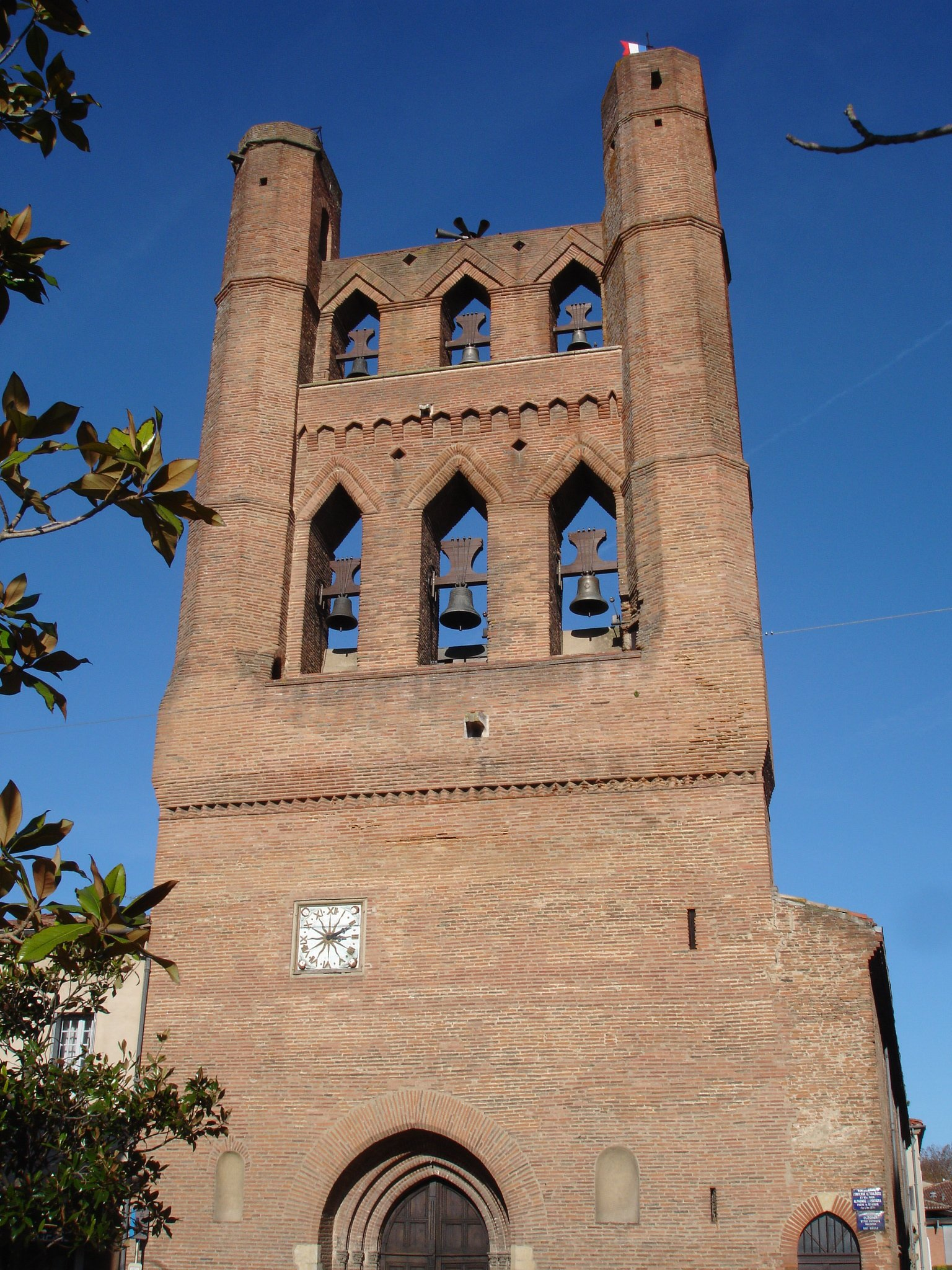
Church of Notre-Dame-de-l'Assomption, Villefranche-de-Lauragais

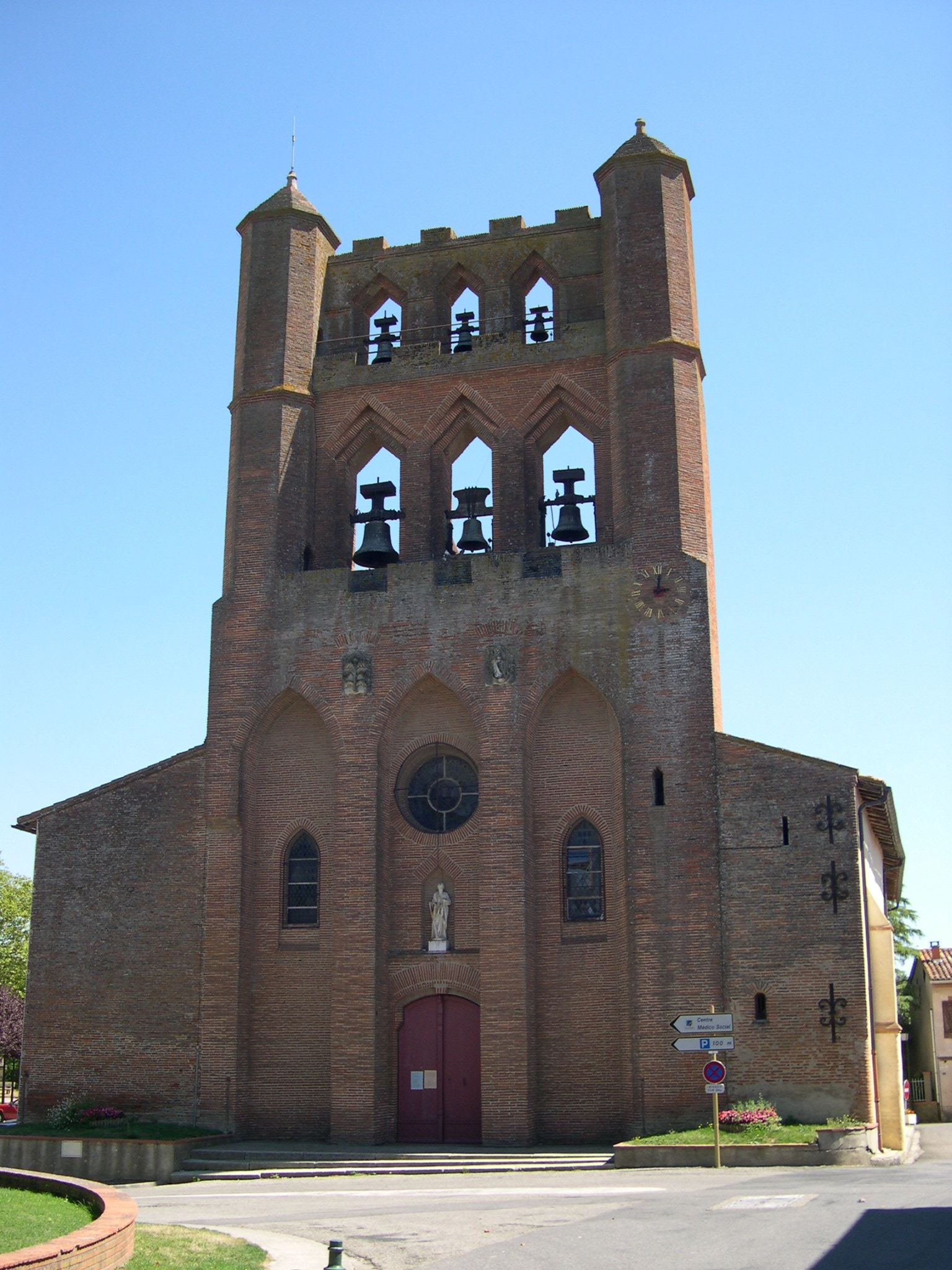
Church of Saint-André, Montgiscard

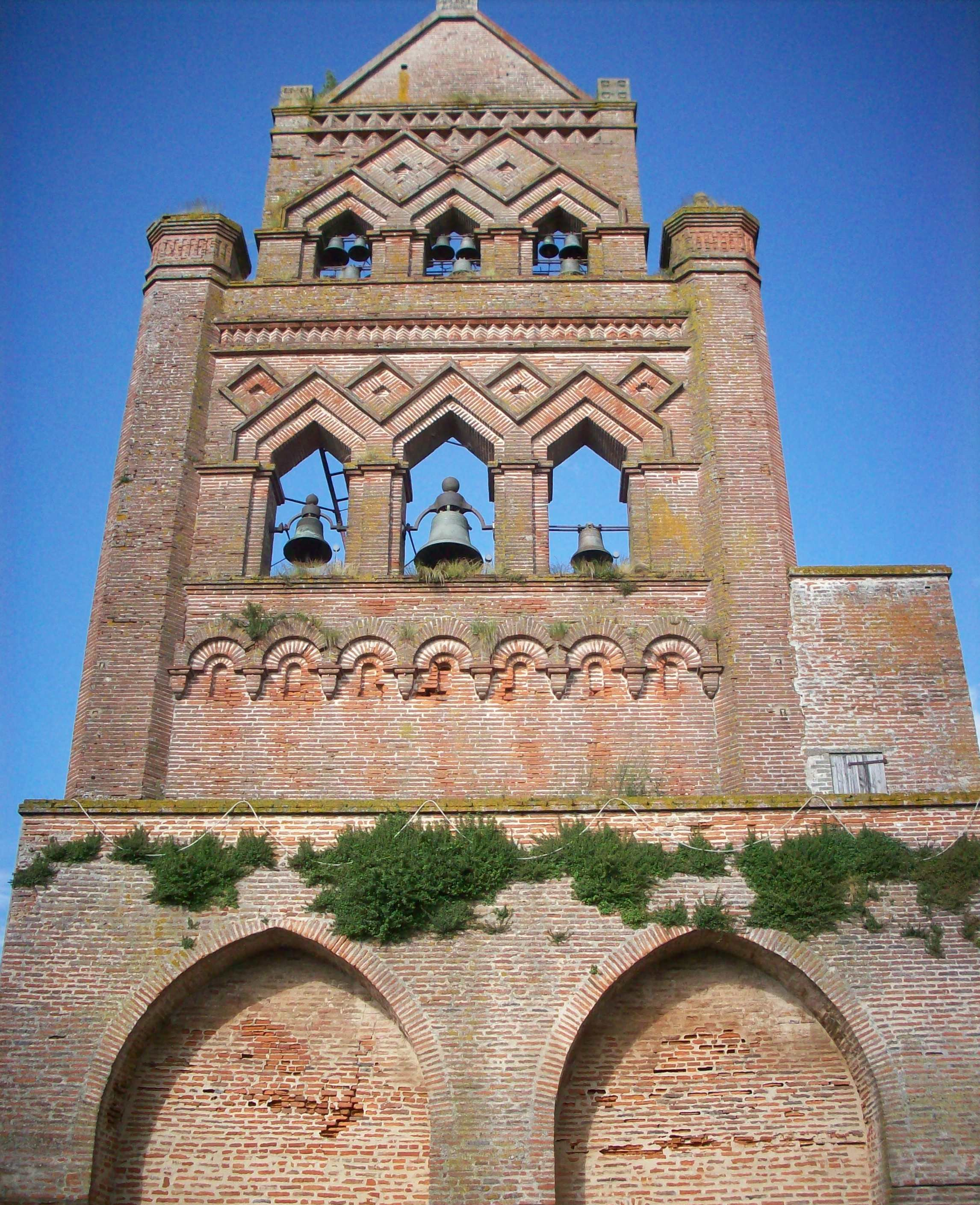
Church of Saint-Eutrope, Miremont

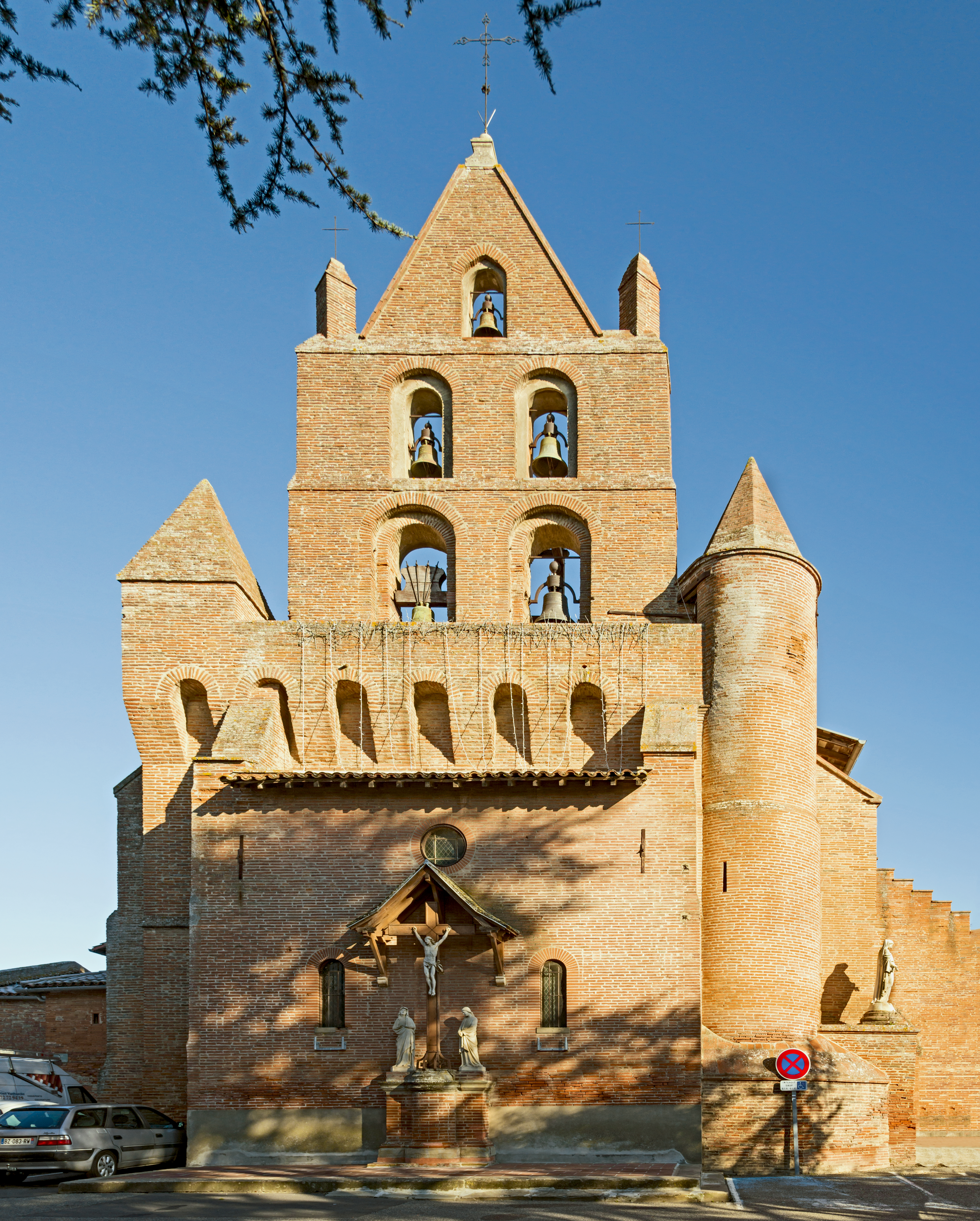
Church of Sainte-Marie-Madeleine, Pibrac

=== Fortification elements ===
Defensive elements such as battlements, machicolations, walkways, and watchtowers are frequent in Southern Gothic churches. Most of the time, except in cases where the church is included in a defensive system, these elements have only a decorative and especially a symbolic role, tending to assert the power of the Church. At the church of Notre-Dame de Simorre, it was the 19th-century architect and conservationist Eugène Viollet-le-Duc who added battlements and watchtowers to the top of the buttresses.

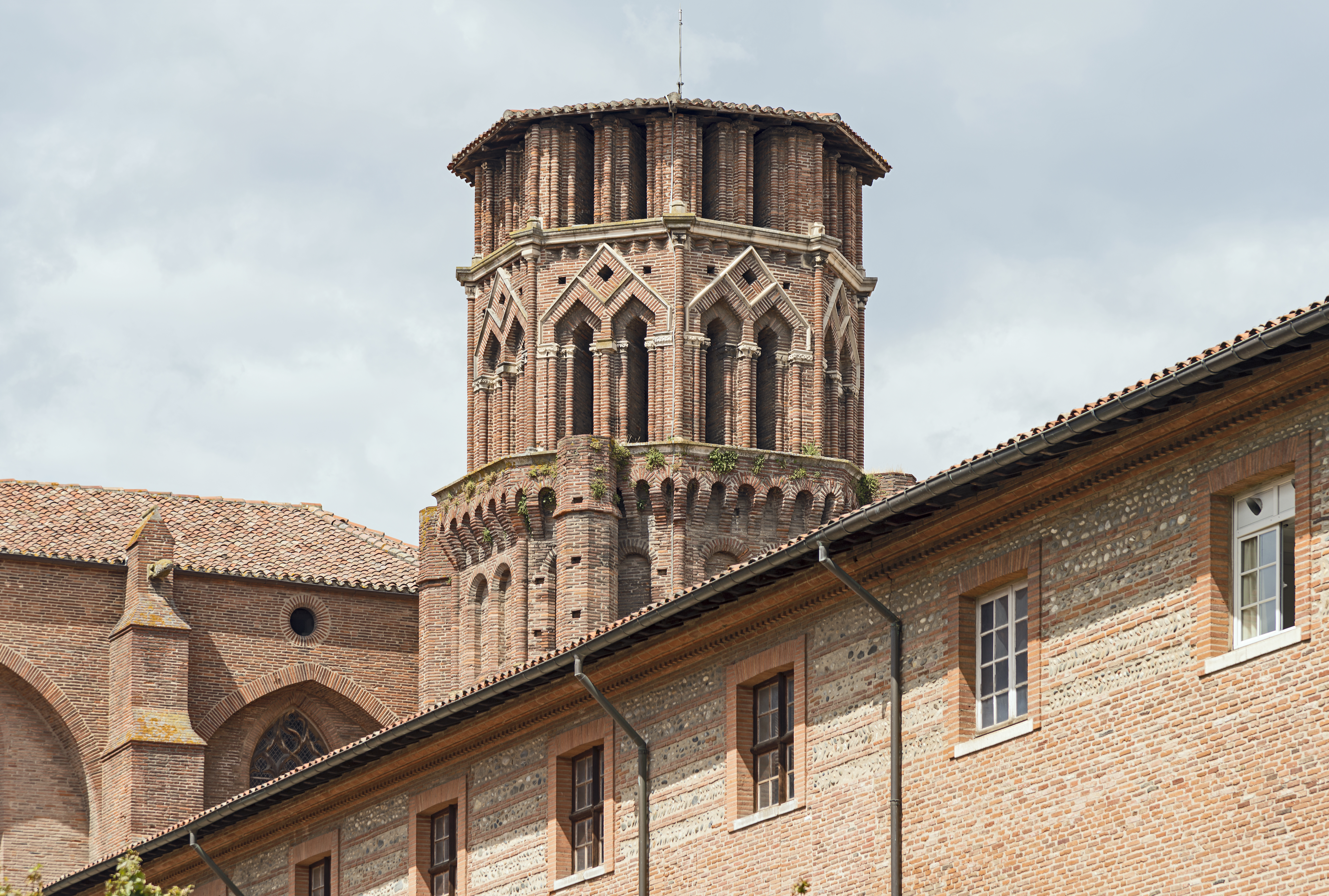
Machicolations, former church of the Augustins, Toulouse

Machico- lations, Church of Saint-Alain, Lavaur

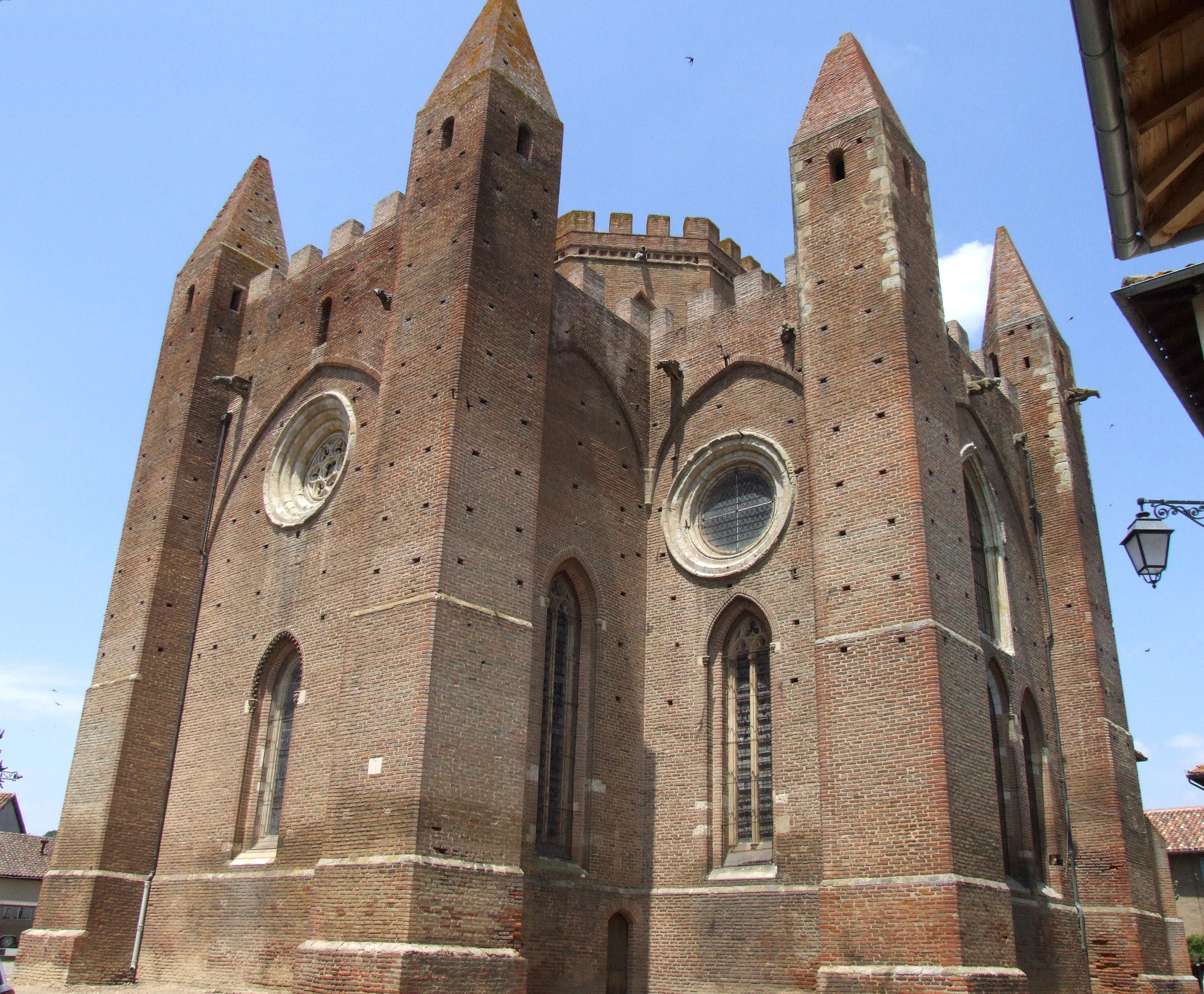
Battlements and watchtowers, Église Notre-Dame, Simorre

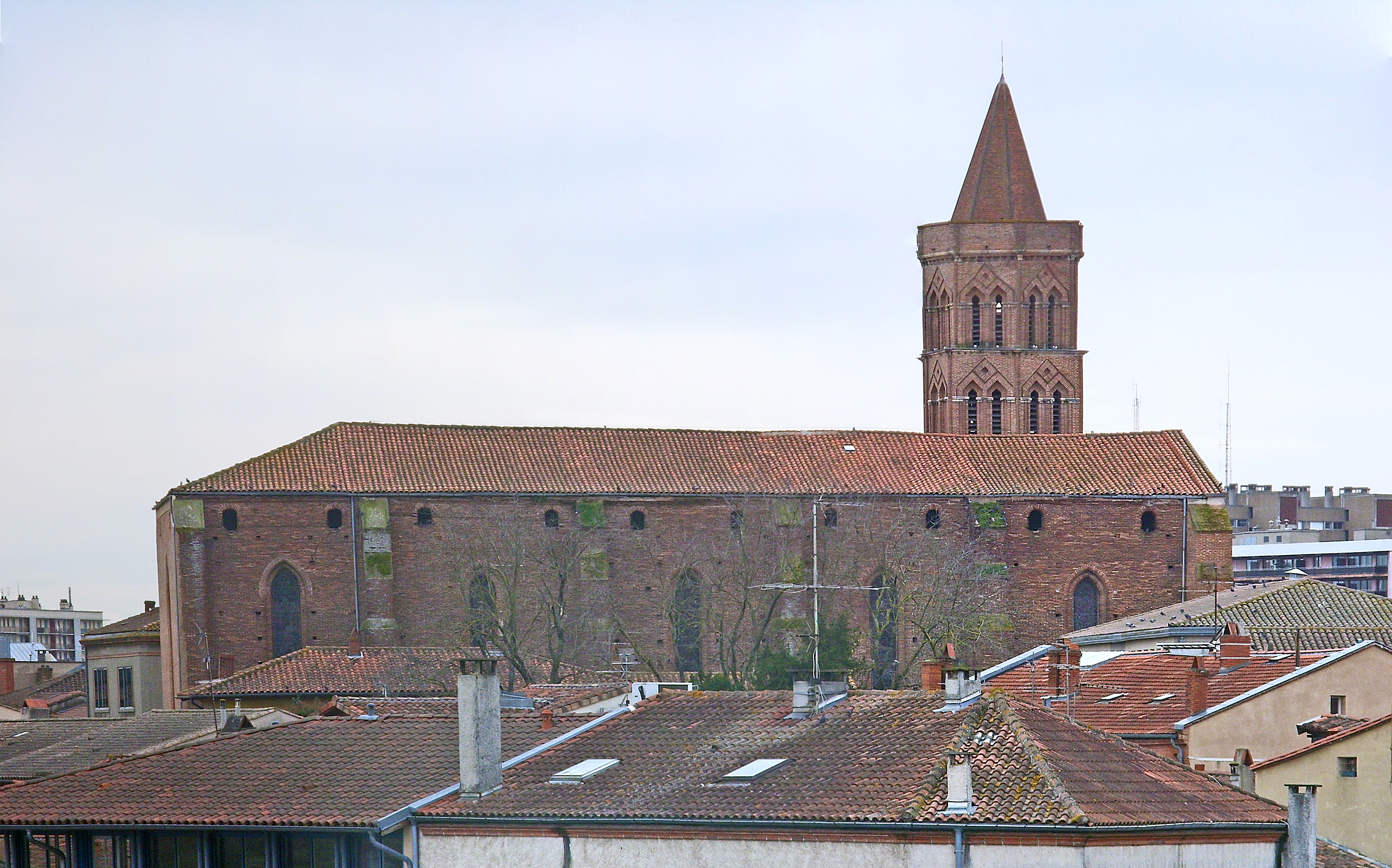
Saint Nicolas Church, Toulouse

== Secular buildings ==
The term "Southern French Gothic" is applied mainly to buildings of worship, churches, and cathedrals. The same architectural principles of sobriety of construction, absence or limitation of carved decoration, massive appearance, and defensive elements can, however, be found in buildings used for other purposes. Examples in Toulouse include mansions and the Saint-Raymond College; in Albi, the Berbie Palace, etc.

== Gallery ==
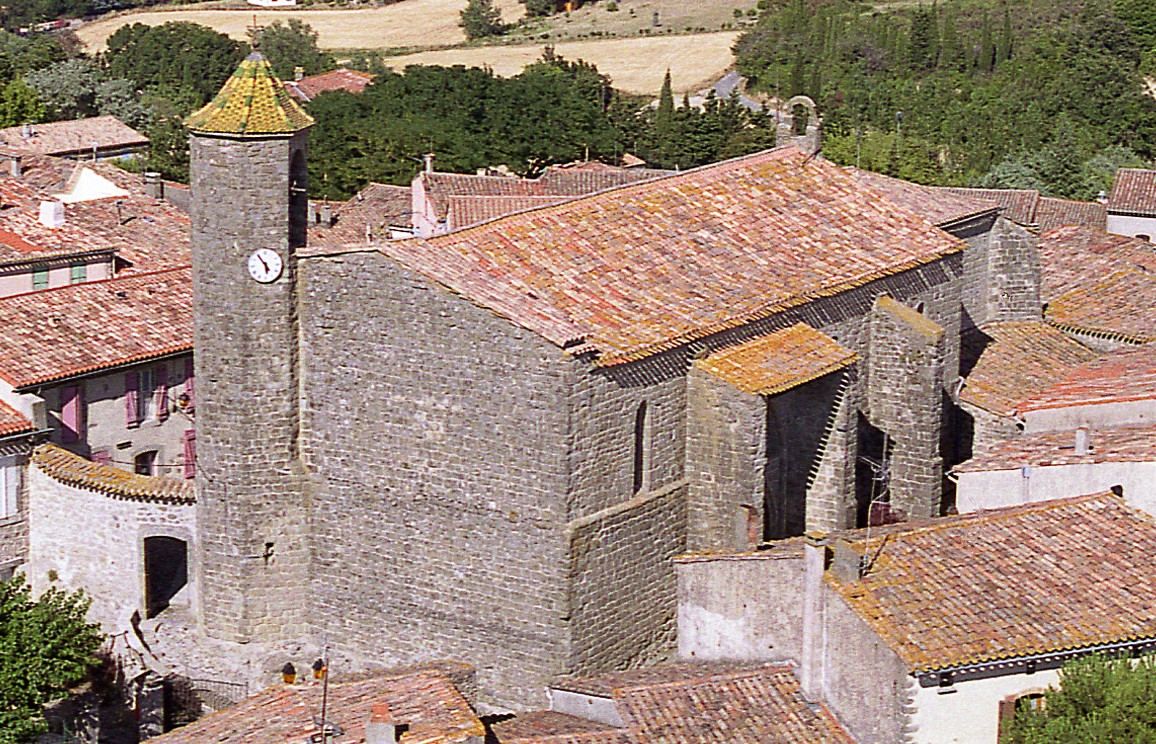
Church of Saint-Germain, Alairac

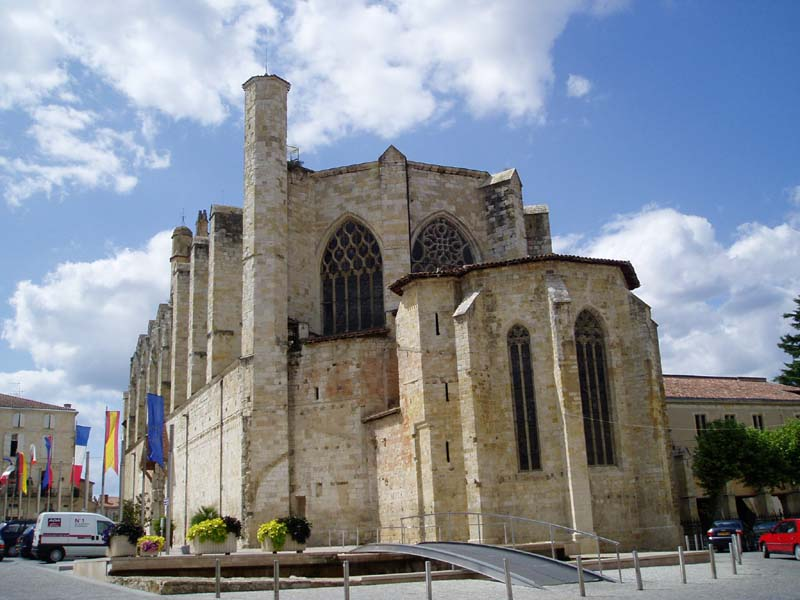
Cathedral of Saint-Pierre, Condom

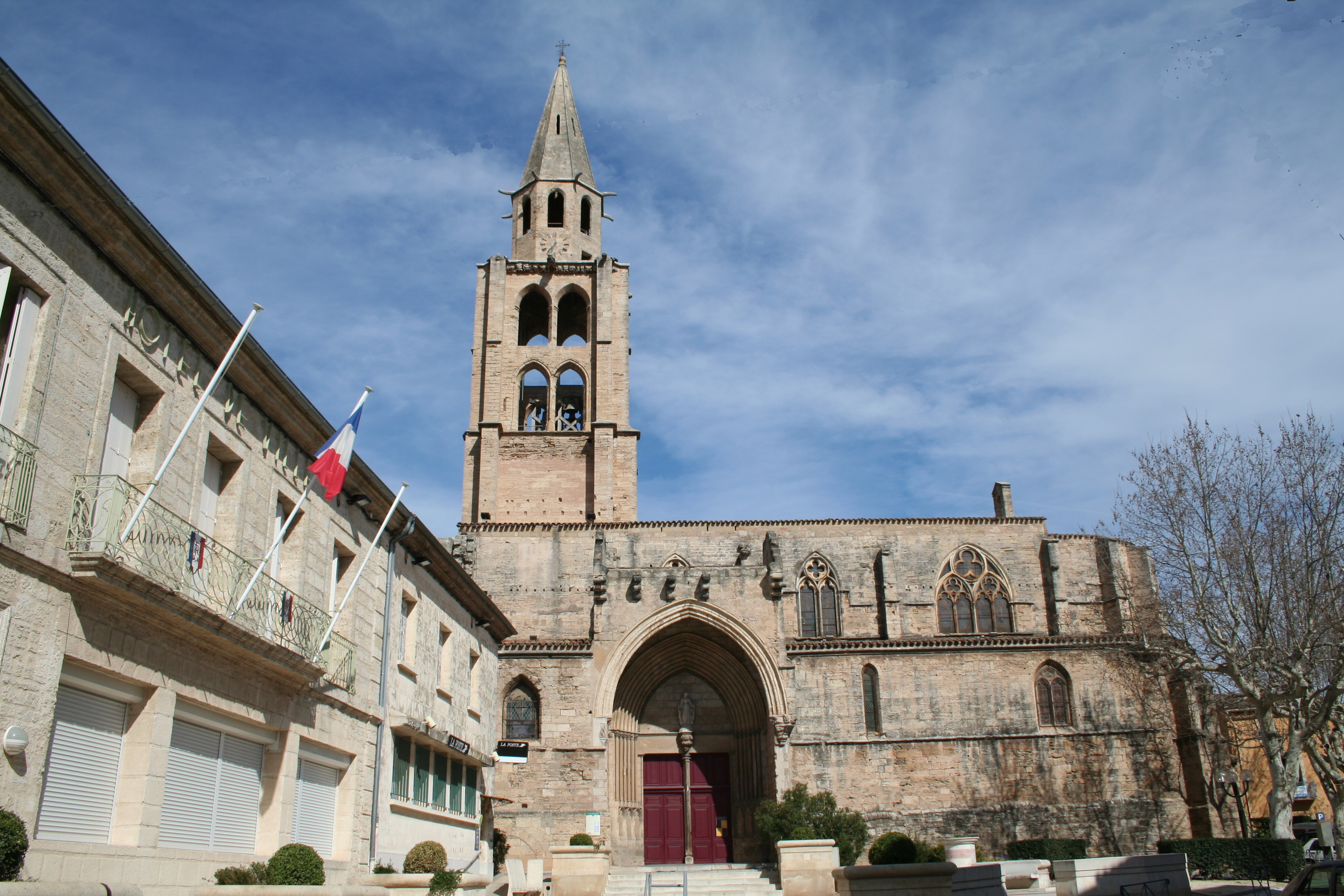
Church of Saint-André, Montagnac (Hérault)

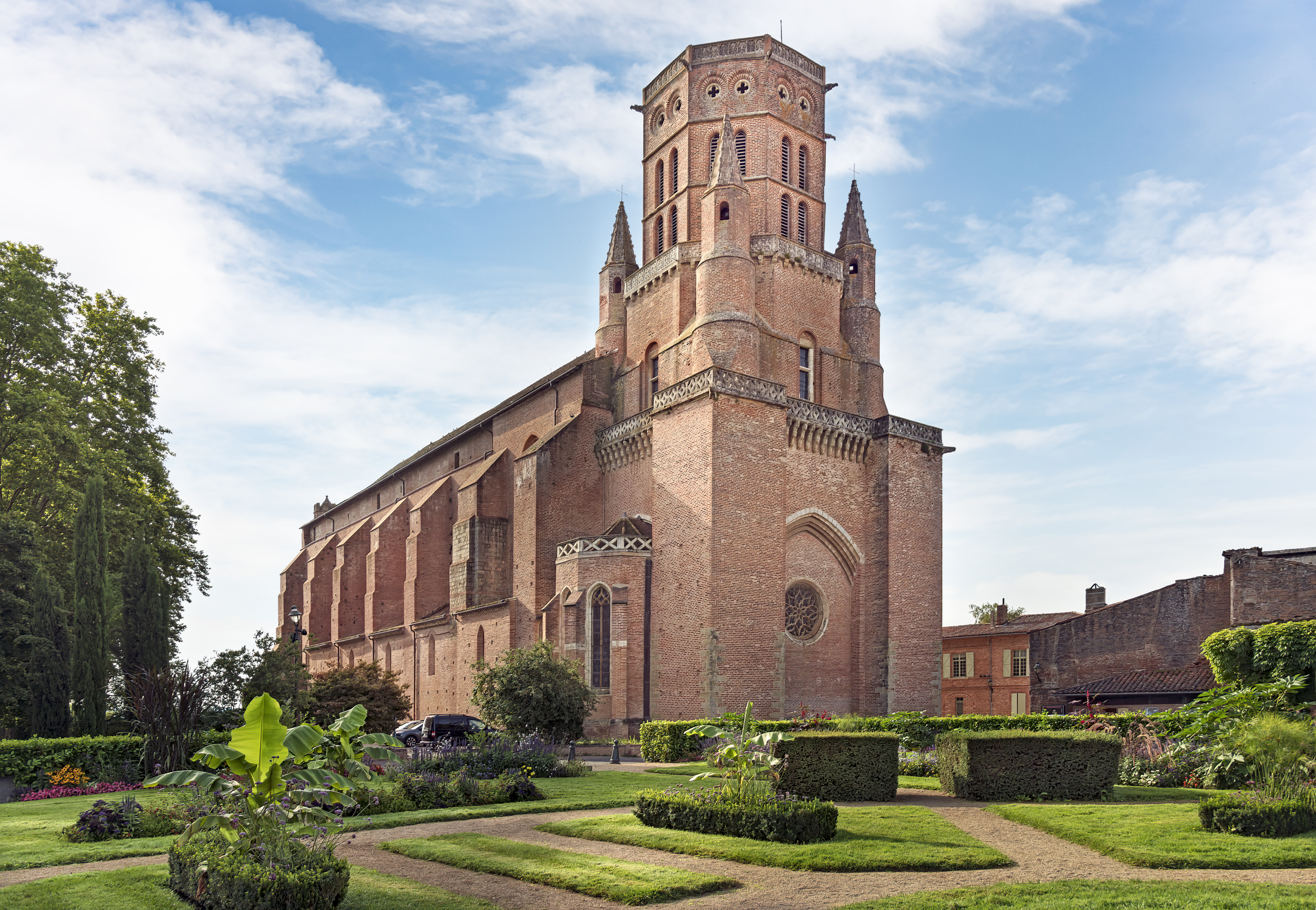
Lavaur Cathedral

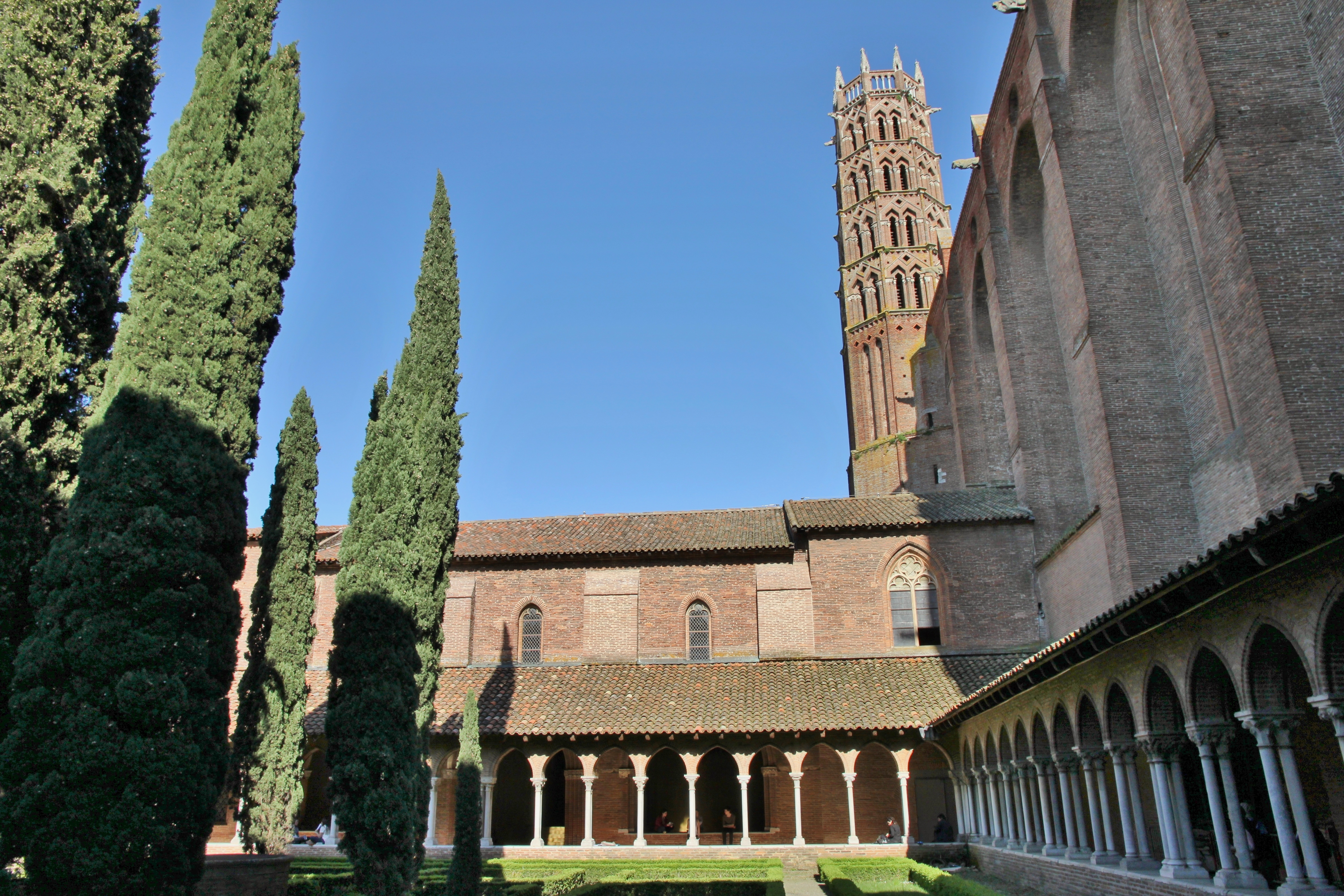
The cloister of the Jacobins convent (Toulouse)

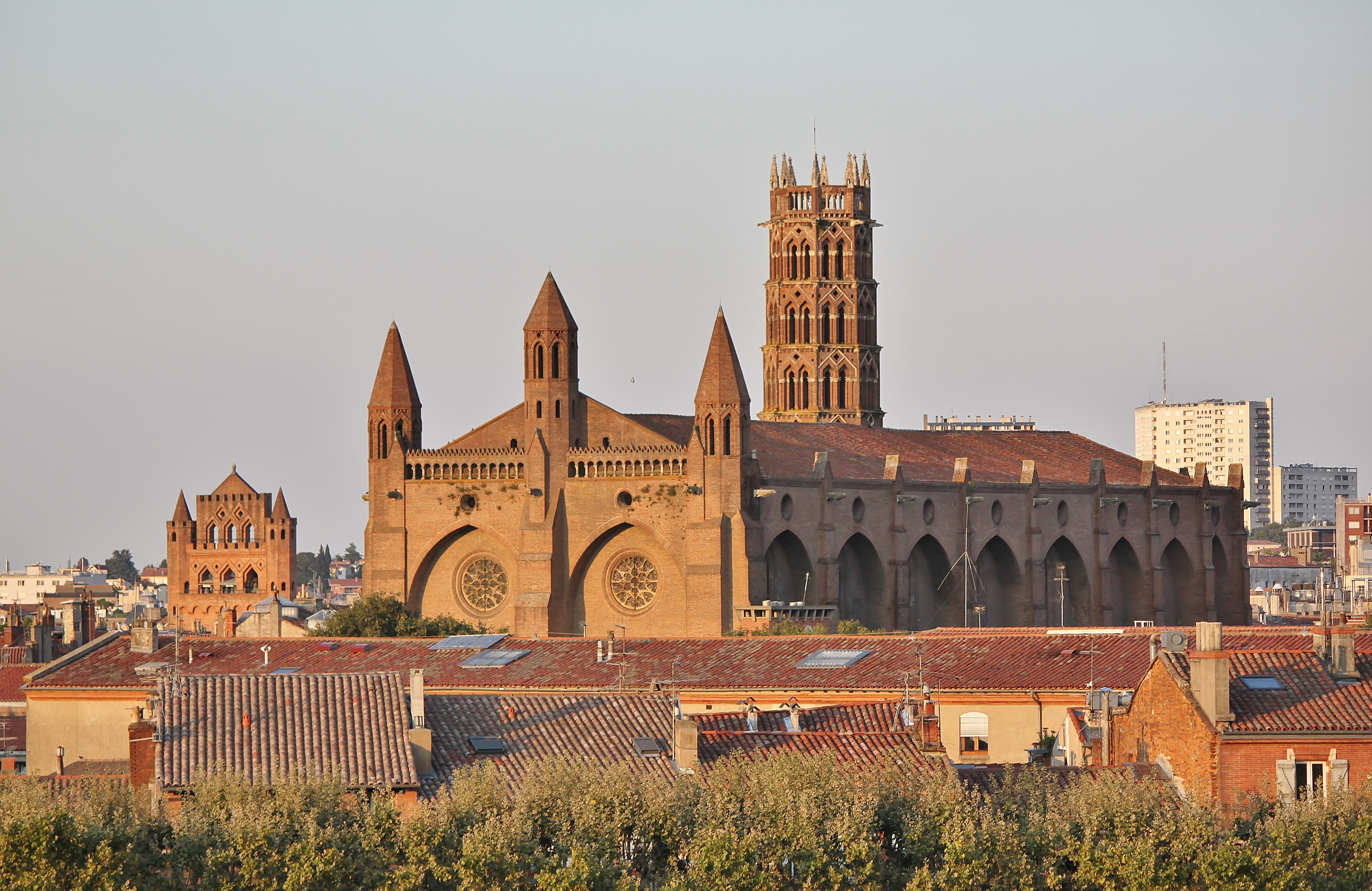
Notre-Dame du Taur (left) and the church of the Jacobins in Toulouse

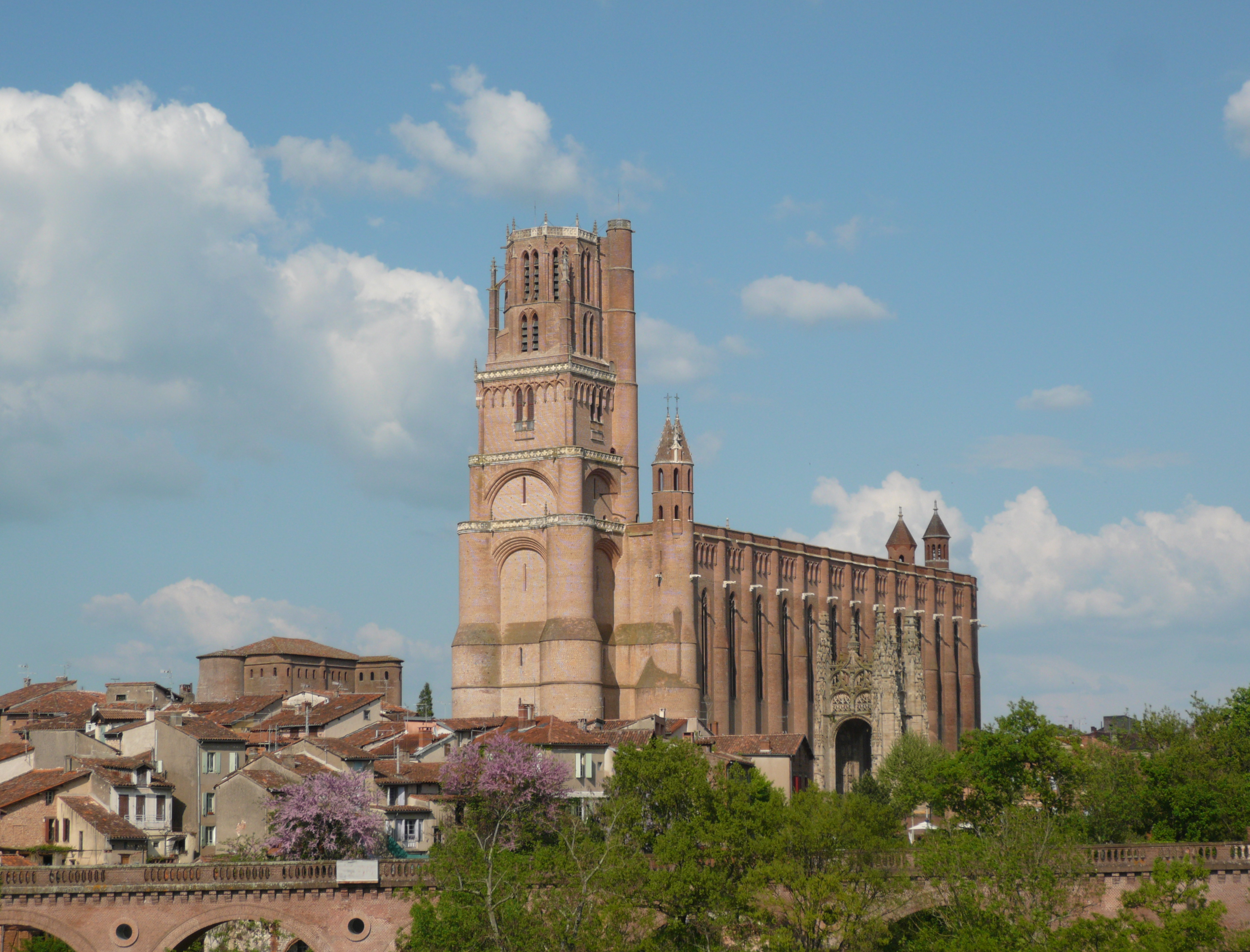
Albi Cathedral

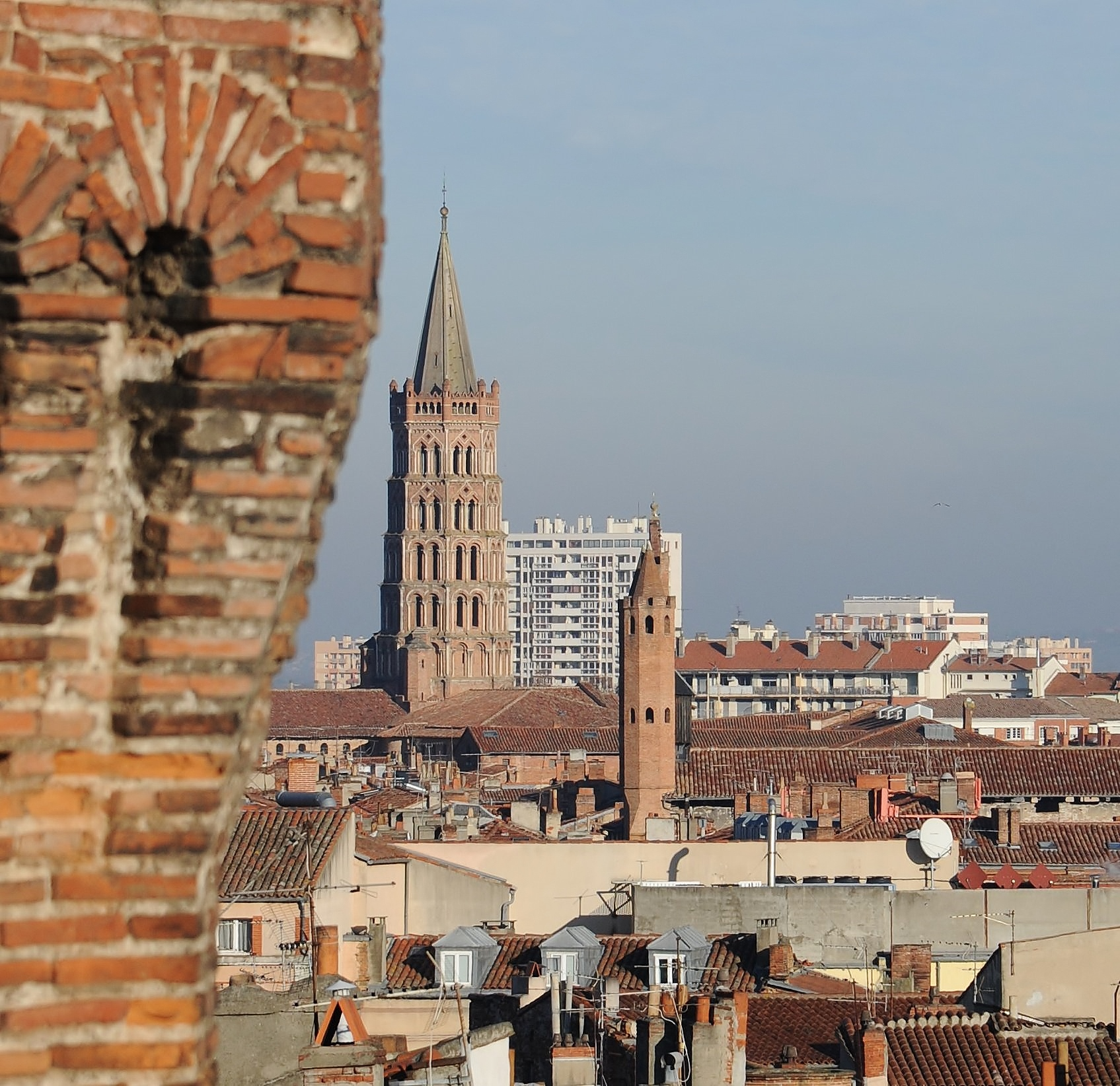
The bell towers of ND du Taur (on the right, seen by the edge) and Saint-Sernin (in the center), models of the bell towers of southern French Gothic.
