= List of fatal dog attacks in France =

List of French dog attack fatalities

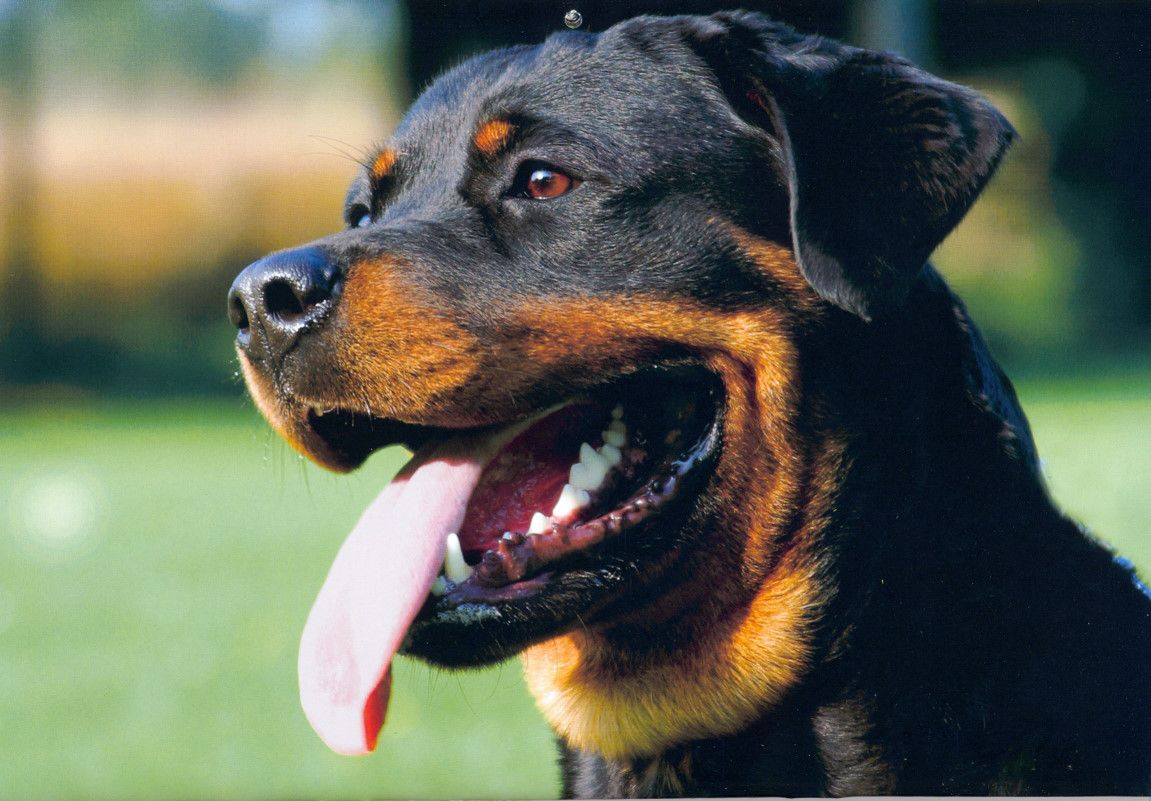
The Rottweiler is classified as a potentially dangerous dog (category 2) under French law.

This is a list of human deaths caused by dogs presented in reverse chronological order, and documented through news media, official reports, cause-of-death statistics, scientific publications, or other sources. For additional information on causes of death and studies related to fatalities resulting from dog bites or attacks, see Fatal dog attacks.

According to a publication that examined fatal dog attacks over a period of 17 years, an average of five people die per year due to a dog attack or as a late consequence of a bite in France (data considered up to the year 2016). Eurostat data recorded 79 fatal attacks during the period studied.

== Fatalities in European France from 2000 to current ==
Date	Victim	Dog type (Number)	Circumstances
August 2, 2025	9, male	Rottweiler	Centre-Val de Loire, Loiret, Escrennes — The boy was home alone when he was killed by the family pet.
August 24, 2024	<1, female	Husky	Auvergne-Rhône-Alpes, Ain, Oyonnax — A 5-day-old girl was attacked by her grandmother's dog. The dog sneaked into the room where the infant was sleeping. The dog was later euthanized.
May 28, 2024	93, female	Dogo Argentino	Occitania, Lédignan, Canaules-et-Argentières — The woman entered the cemetery to visit a grave when she was attacked by the dog. He seriously injured her in the neck region. The dog escaped from a young woman who was walking with three dogs at the cemetery.
December 29, 2023	41, male	Rottweiler	Pays de la Loire, Tiercé — The dog attacked its owner and another man. The two men, aged 41 and 51, were found the next morning. They hid in their car in fear of the dog which was still around. One died, and the second victim was seriously injured.
July 5, 2023	1, male	Caucasian Shepherd Dog	Bourgogne-Franche-Comté, Yonne, Charny-Orée-de-Puisaye — The 18-month-old boy was playing in the garden. At some point, he opened the door to a kennel at the end of the garden and was bit in the face by the dog.
January 26, 2021	38, female	Rottweiler (2)	Occitania, Tarn, Senouillac — She was killed by her two dogs and was found dead by a family member in her garden.
August 8, 2020	1, female	Pit bull	Nouvelle-Aquitaine, Charente-Maritime, Gémozac — The 16-month-old girl was attacked by her father's dog.
November, 2019	Elisa Pilarski, 29, female	American Pit Bull Terrier	Hauts-de-France, Aisne, Forêt de Retz — The pregnant woman was walking her partner's dog named "Curtis" in the forest. The partner blamed hunting hounds for the death but DNA testing cleared those dogs. The dog also bit someone at the animal shelter.
January 19, 2017	1, female	Rottweiler	Hauts-de-France, Saint-Aubin, Aisne — The family's dog attacked the 14-month-old baby girl and bit her in the head. The mother brought a second child to a safe place and then tried to free the girl from the Rottweiler. The second dog, a Jack Russell, also joined in the attack and bit the girl several times.
May 6, 2016	1, male	American Staffordshire Terrier	Grand Est, Epfig — The 18-month-old boy was bitten to death by the family dog. The dog was euthanized the same evening.
June 22, 2009	44, female	Bull Terrier	Île-de-France, Oise, Godenvillers — A woman was killed by the family pet named "Baby".
March 29, 2009	6, female	German Mastiff (2)	Grand Est, Marne, Chalons-en-Champagne, Grandes-Loges — The dogs were in a fenced-in area and it is unclear how the victim got there.
January 9, 2008	2, male	Rottweiler	Auvergne-Rhône-Alpes, Charnay — A two-and-a-half-year-old boy was killed by the family dog named "Sultan".
October 23, 2007	Aaron, 1, male	Rottweiler Mix (German Shepherd, Beauceron)	Île-de-France, Seine-Saint-Denis, Bobigny — The dog attacked the 19-month-old boy while he was waiting for the elevator with his mother and aunt in the entrance of a building.
September 22, 2007	Amandine, 10, female	German Mastiff (2)	Hauts-de-France, Oise, Auteuil — The pregnant mother was in the house and heard screams outside. She ran out but was not able to save her daughter. The girl was bitten on the neck, chest and one arm and died from her injuries.
August 17, 2007, August 26, 2007 †	1, female	American Staffordshire Terrier	Grand Est, Marne, Épernay — The 18-month-old girl was bitten by a dog that belonged to a family member. She was attacked on August 17 and died on August 26.
November 22, 2006	Angélique, 23, female	Rottweiler (2–4)	Hauts-de-France, Oise, Allonne — The young woman was attacked by her own dogs in her yard. First responders had to shoot the dogs to get to her.
June 11, 2006	Fatima, 1, female	American Staffordshire Terrier	Île-de-France, Sevran — A 17-month-old girl died after being bitten by her uncle's dog.
June 1, 2006	Louis, 8, male	Bullmastiff	Normandy, Seine-Maritime, Cauville-sur-Mer — The child had been invited by friends. He was standing near a pond when, for no apparent reason, the dog grabbed him by the neck and injured his carotid artery.
July 18, 2005	2, female	Unknown	Brittany, Ploneour-Lanvern, Pont-l'Abbé — The 2-year-old girl was attacked by the dog of visitors.
November 9, 2004	51, male	German Shepherd (2)	Grand Est, Bas-Rhin, Barr — Two dogs escaped the property they were guarding and attacked the man in his garden.
January 7, 2004	<1, male	Bull Terrier	Occitania, Narbonne — A two-month-old infant was killed in his cradle by the family dog.
November 18, 2003	69, male	German Shepherd (2), American Staffordshire Terrier (1)	Nouvelle-Aquitaine, Buzet-sur-Baïse — A man died after being attacked by dogs near his property.
October 1, 2003	58, female	Rottweiler	Provence-Alpes-Côte d'Azur, Garéoult — The woman was attacked by a dog in her house.
July 15, 2003	32, male	Pit bull	Provence-Alpes-Côte d'Azur — A 32-year-old homeless man was killed by his dog in Marseille.
May 21, 2003	<1	Belgian Shepherd of the variety Malinois	Hauts-de-France, Holque — A two-month-old baby died following a bite.
June 1, 2000	Maria Berthelot, 86, female	American Staffordshire Terrier (4), Pit bull (1)	Nouvelle-Aquitaine, Charente-Maritime, Rochefort — The victim was attacked by 5 dogs that escaped their owner through a hole in a fence. She was found still surrounded by the pack of dogs. Due to the severity of the mutilation, it was not clear whether the victim was male or female at first. The dogs were euthanized. The dog owners (mother and son) were convicted of manslaughter and ordered to pay €65,000 in damages in 2002.

== Fatalities in the overseas territories of France from 2010 to current ==
Date	Victim	Dog type (Number)	Circumstances
October 23, 2024	77, male	Molosse* (1–8)	Martinique, Sainte-Anne — He was looking after his ex-partner's dogs and was attacked while feeding them. *In French the term "molosse" refers not only to dogs listed in the kennel club classification molossoid (French: Molossoïde), but also to a variety of large or impressive dogs, like pit bull type dogs.
October 30, 2022	84, female	Dogo Argentino	Réunion, Saint-Paul, Bellemène — She was on the family property tending to the flowers and the pet dogs as the loose purebred dog stormed into the yard and first attacked the chicken and then her. The dog was shot.
May 12, 2020	87, female	Pit bull mix (4) Mixed breed stray dog (1)	French Polynesia, Pirae — The woman was taking her daily walk and was attacked by 4 escaped dogs named Indica, Fox, Auhei, and Lili. A stray dog was also involved. She suffered extreme injuries and died. The dogs' owners and some family members were sentenced in 2024. The dogs were euthanized.
October 5, 2013	Sacha, 7, male	Rottweiler Bull Terrier	Réunion, Chaudron, Bois-de-Nèfles Sainte-Clotilde — The boy was in his yard and was bitten several times by the family's 6-month-old Rottweiler. The second dog also bit the child. A neighbor noticed the attack and alerted emergency services, but the boy died at the scene.
July 6, 2010; July 14 †	75, male	Cane Corso (2)	Réunion, Saint-Paul, Saint-Gilles les Hauts — The man was attacked by loose dogs while taking a walk. He was taken to St. Paul's Hospital but died a week later. The dog owner was sentenced in 2015.

== Legal consequences ==
In France, dog owners or dog handlers are liable for any damage caused by their dog. In case of a fatal dog attack, the responsible person can be prosecuted for manslaughter and face up to 5 years in prison and €75,000 of fine. Penalties can increase to 7 years imprisonment and €100,000 of fine if one of the following applies:

- possession or keeping of the dog has been prohibited by law or court order
- the dog owner was under the influence of alcohol or narcotics
- laws regarding 1st or 2nd category dogs (potentially dangerous dogs) were not complied with
- the dog was abused
- mandatory vaccination against rabies is not up to date

These penalties increase to 10 years imprisonment and €150,000 of fine when at least 2 circumstances were present when the dog attack occurred.

== Legislation ==
=== Animal cruelty ===
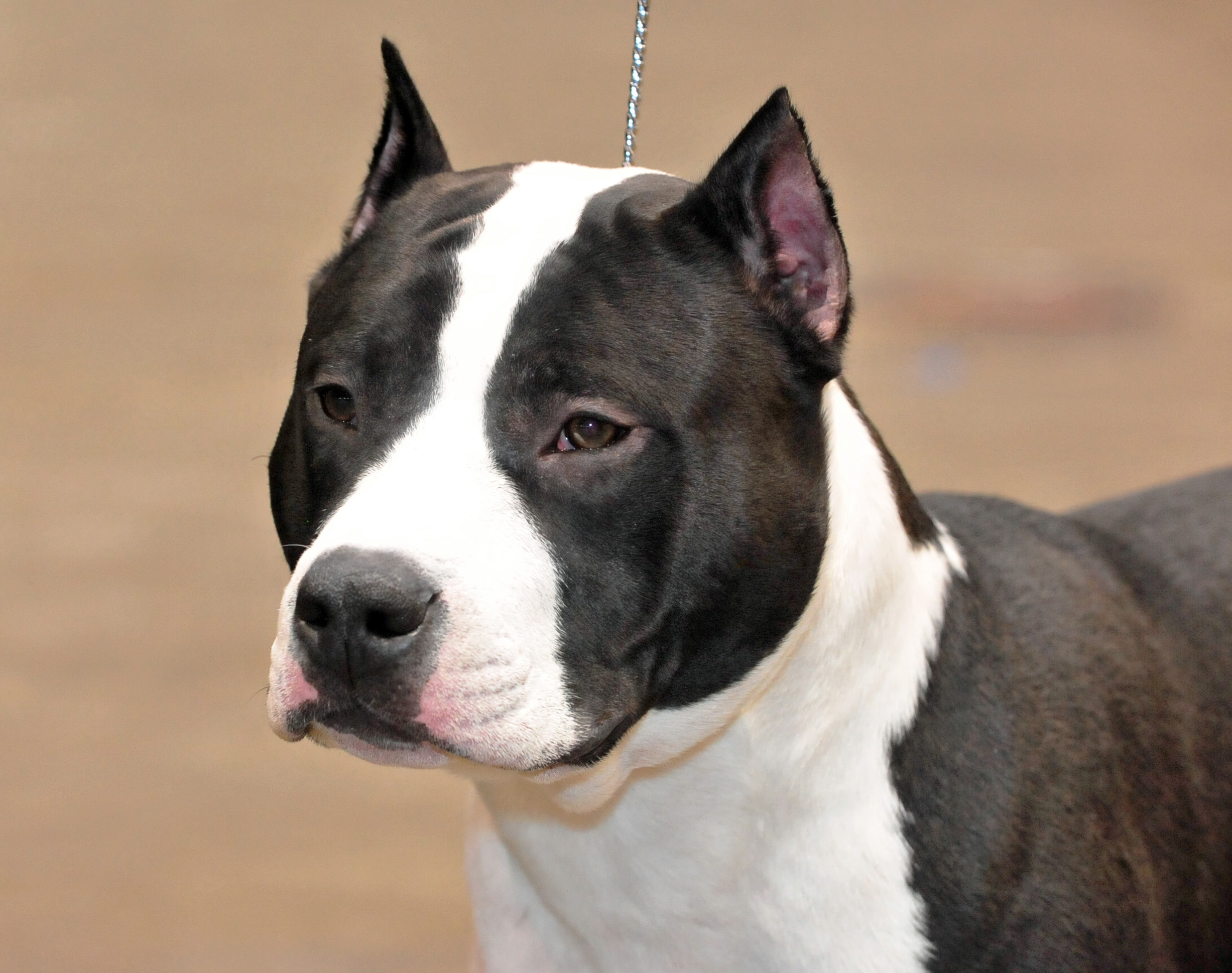
Ear cropping is considered animal cruelty and is illegal in France.

Laws regarding the keeping and well-being of dogs are regulated on a national and on a European level in France. France ratified the European Convention for the Protection of Pet Animals in 2003. The treaty of the Council of Europe prohibits the docking of tails, debarking and removing of the four canine teeth (defanging). The article R214-21 of the Rural and Maritime Fishing Code also prohibits surgical procedures for cosmetic purposes, like the cropping of dog ears. The articles 521-1 to 521-2 of the penal code regulate the penalties for animal cruelty. If a dog shows signs of mistreatment it can lead to aggravating circumstances in a fatal dog attack case.

=== Dangerous dogs ===
France changed its laws in 1999 with the intention of reducing attacks and serious injuries caused by dogs. In 2008, the relevant laws were tightened, introducing behavioral assessment and mandatory training sessions for all dogs that bit a person. Furthermore it was made easier to seize potentially dangerous dogs. The articles R211-11 to R211-18 of the Rural and Maritime Fishing Code regulate dangerous dogs and list several measurements to prevent danger.

French rural and penal codes distinguishes between two categories of dangerous dogs.

Category 1: Attack dogs (fr. chiens d'attaque) are dogs from crossings morphologically similar to dogs like the American Staffordshire Terrier (commonly known as pit bull), Mastiff (commonly known as boerbulls) or Tosa. The American Pit Bull Terrier is not recognized as a dog breed in France, instead they are seen as a type of dog (pit bull).

Since January 6, 1999, any transfer (buying, selling, importing) of a category 1 dog is an offense. This applies to European France, overseas departments and regions of France, Saint-Barthélemy, Saint-Martin and Saint-Pierre-et-Miquelon. Violations are punishable with 6 months imprisonment and €15,000 of fine. This also adheres to tourists or people who only pass through France with their dog.

Category 2: Guard or defense dogs (fr. chiens de garde et de défense) are purebred dogs such as the American Staffordshire Terrier, the Rottweiler or the Tosa with a pedigree as well as dogs morphologically similar to Rottweilers (without pedigree papers).

Owners of category 1 and category 2 dogs have to fulfill certain requirements and adhere to certain rules, like having a civil liability insurance or having their dog secured on a leash and with a muzzle, for example.

== Prevention measures ==
=== Collecting loose or stray dogs ===
Local authorities are responsible for collecting loose or stray dogs. Each municipality must have suitable facilities to house those dogs. If the owner of the dog can be identified, he will be informed by the authorities and can claim the dog within 8 days. The dog owner is liable for all costs that arise when a dog has to be caught and cared for. If the dog is not claimed within 8 days it will be transferred to an animal shelter and put up for adoption.

=== Health surveillance and behavioral assessment ===
Anyone with knowledge of a dog attacking a human is required to make a report (including health care workers treating bite injuries) of the incident to the local authorities. Two proceedings are mandatory in case of a dog bite:

- health surveillance of the dog
- behavioral assessment of the dog

The health of the dog must be surveilled by an authorized veterinarian for a period of 15 days. The dog must be seen by the same veterinarian 3 times (within 24 hours of the bite, 7 days and 15 days later). This health surveillance is obligatory, even if the dog is vaccinated against rabies.

== See also ==
- Lists of fatal shark attacks
- List of wolf attacks
