= Pujaudran =

- Commune
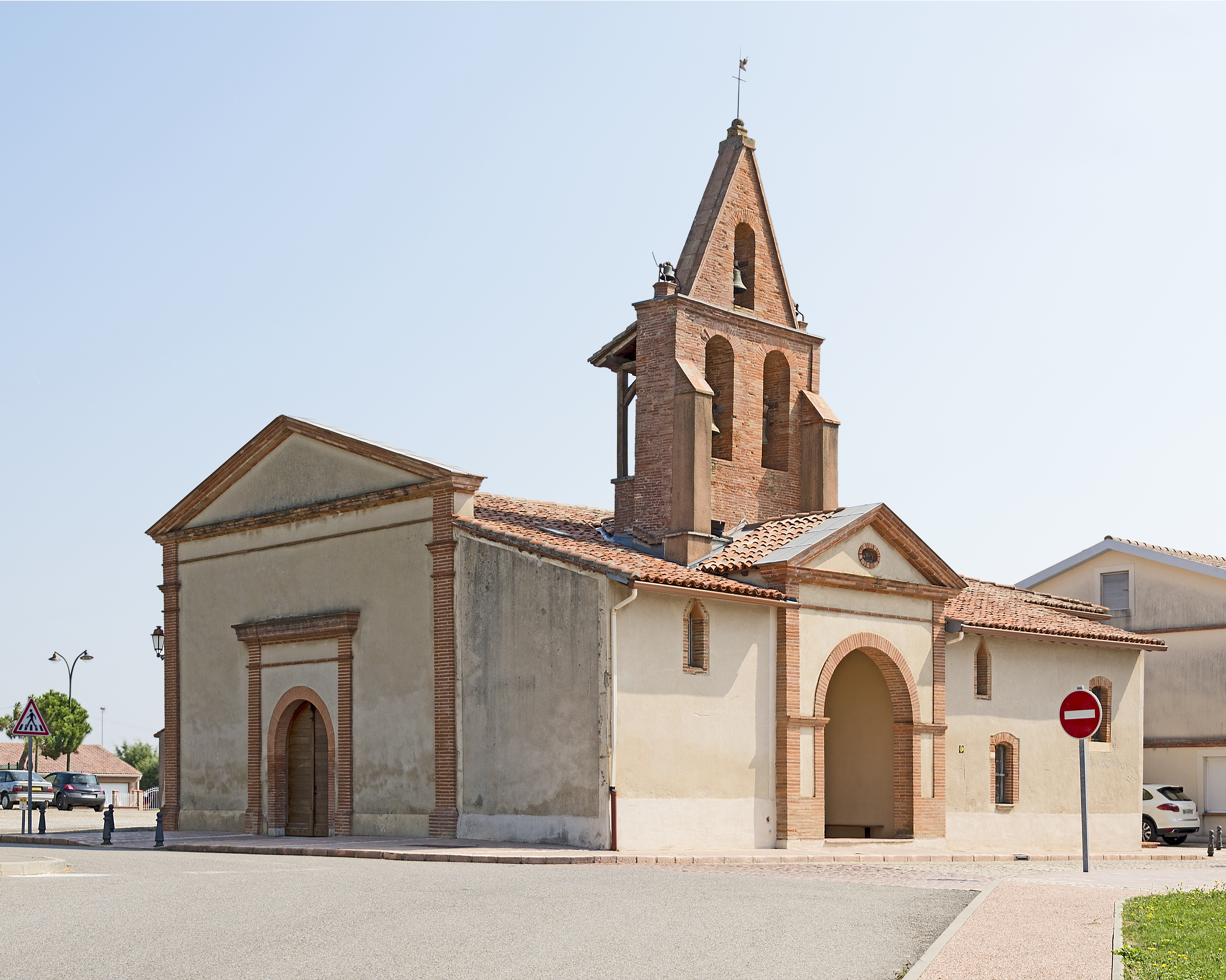
- The church in Pujaudran

- Coat of arms
- Location of Pujaudran
- Location within France Location within Occitanie
- Coordinates: 43°35′30″N 1°09′00″E
- Country: France
- Region: Occitania
- Department: Gers
- Arrondissement: Auch
- Canton: L'Isle-Jourdain
- Intercommunality: Gascogne Toulousaine

Government
  - Mayor (2020–2026): Muriel Abadie
- Area^{1}: 17.41 km^{2} (6.72 sq mi)
- Elevation: 297 m (974 ft)
- Highest elevation: 305 m (1,001 ft)
- Lowest elevation: 194 m (636 ft)
- Population (2023): 1,750
  - Density: 101/km^{2} (260/sq mi)
- Time zone: UTC+01:00 (CET)
  - Summer (DST): UTC+02:00 (CEST)
- INSEE/Postal code: 32334 /32600
- ^{1} French Land Register data, which excludes lakes, ponds, glaciers > 1 km^{2} (0.386 sq mi or 247 acres) and river estuaries.

Pujaudran (French pronunciation: [pyʒodʁɑ̃]) is a commune in the Gers department in southwestern France. Historically and culturally, the commune is in the Savès, a small Gascon province corresponding to the middle course of the Save.

Exposed to a modified oceanic climate, it is drained by the Rémoulin River, the Saint-Blaise stream, the Paradis stream, and several other small waterways. The town's natural heritage consists of two natural areas of ecological, faunal, and floral interest. Part of the Forêt de Bouconne lies within the town's boundaries.

Pujaudran is a rural town with a population of 1,708 in 2022, having experienced significant growth since 1968. It is part of the greater Toulouse area.

== Geography ==
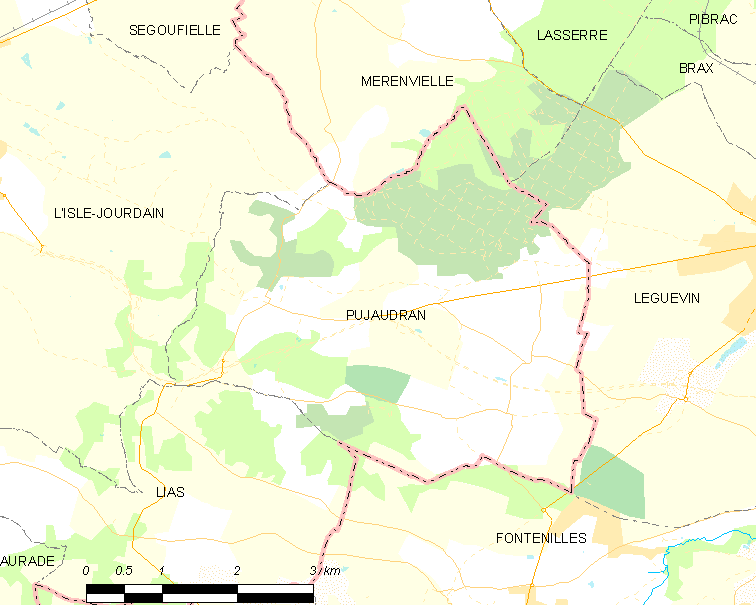
Pujaudran and its surrounding communes

=== Location ===
Pujaudran is a commune in the Toulouse metropolitan area, located 6 km east-southeast of L'Isle-Jourdain and about thirty kilometers west of Toulouse, just past Léguevin on the road to Auch. The commune borders the Haute-Garonne department.

=== Neighboring communes ===
Pujaudran borders five other communes, three of which are in the Haute-Garonne department.

=== Localities or hamlets ===
Au Battut, Pesqué, Galabart, La Carrerasse, Dalezan,

=== Geology and relief ===
The commune occupies the last terrace of the Garonne River before the Gascony hills. Its territory is divided into a lower part, known as the Plain, and an upper part, which includes the village itself. Part of the Forêt de Bouconne is located within the commune.

The commune covers an area of 1,741 hectares; its altitude ranges from 194 to 297 meters.

Pujaudran is located in seismic zone 1 (very low seismicity).

=== Hydrography ===
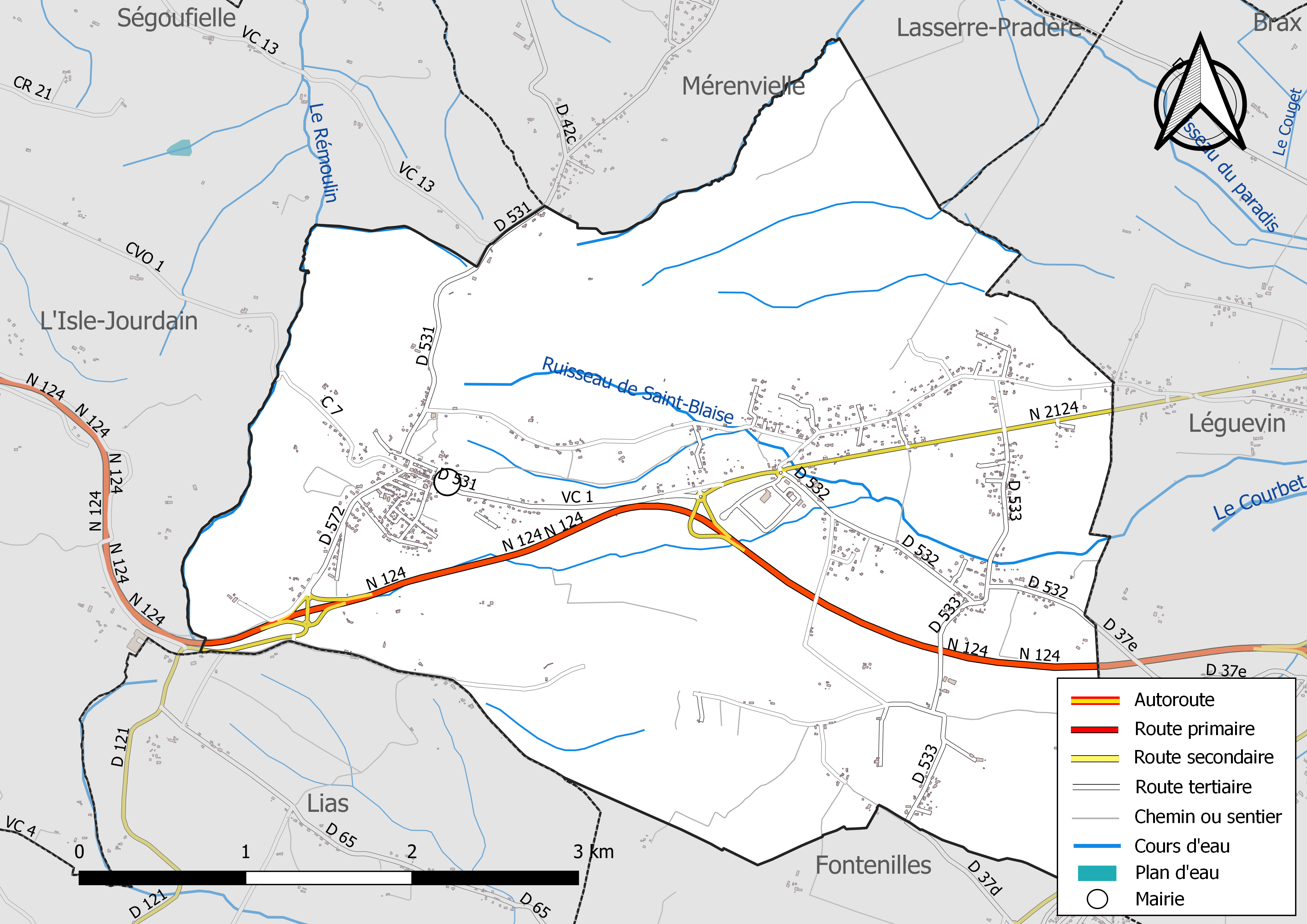
Water and road networks of Pujaudran.

The commune is in the Garonne basin, within the Adour-Garonne hydrographic basin. It is drained by the Rémoulin, the Saint-Blaise stream, the paradise stream, the Moulinasse and by various small streams such as the golden chibrette, which constitute a hydrographic network of 17 km in total length.

=== Natural environment and biodiversity ===
The zone naturelle d'intérêt écologique, faunistique et floristique (ZNIEFF) aims to cover the most ecologically significant areas, primarily to improve knowledge of the national natural heritage and to provide decision-makers with a tool to help them integrate environmental considerations into land-use planning. Two type 1 ZNIEFFs are identified within the commune: the "Bois des Arramous" (416 ha), covering three communes, one in Haute-Garonne and two in Gers, and the "Forêt de Bouconne" (2,868 ha), covering ten communes, nine in Haute-Garonne and one in Gers.

== Urban planning ==
=== Typology ===
As of 1 January 2024, Pujaudran is categorized as a rural commune with dispersed housing, according to the new seven-level municipal density scale defined by INSEE in 2022. It is located outside an urban area. Furthermore, the commune is part of the Toulouse metropolitan area, of which it is a peripheral commune. This area, which includes 527 communes, is categorized as having a population of 700,000 or more (excluding Paris).

=== Land use ===
Land cover in the commune, as shown in the European biophysical land cover database Corine Land Cover (CLC), is characterized by a significant amount of agricultural land (56% in 2018), a decrease compared to 1990 (63.9%). The detailed breakdown in 2018 is as follows: heterogeneous agricultural areas (33.1%), forests (33%), arable land (22.9%), urbanized areas (8.1%), and areas with shrub and/or herbaceous vegetation (2.9%). Changes in land cover and infrastructure within the commune can be observed on various maps of the territory: the Cassini map (18th century), the General Staff map (1820-1866), and IGN maps and aerial photographs for the current period (1950 to the present).

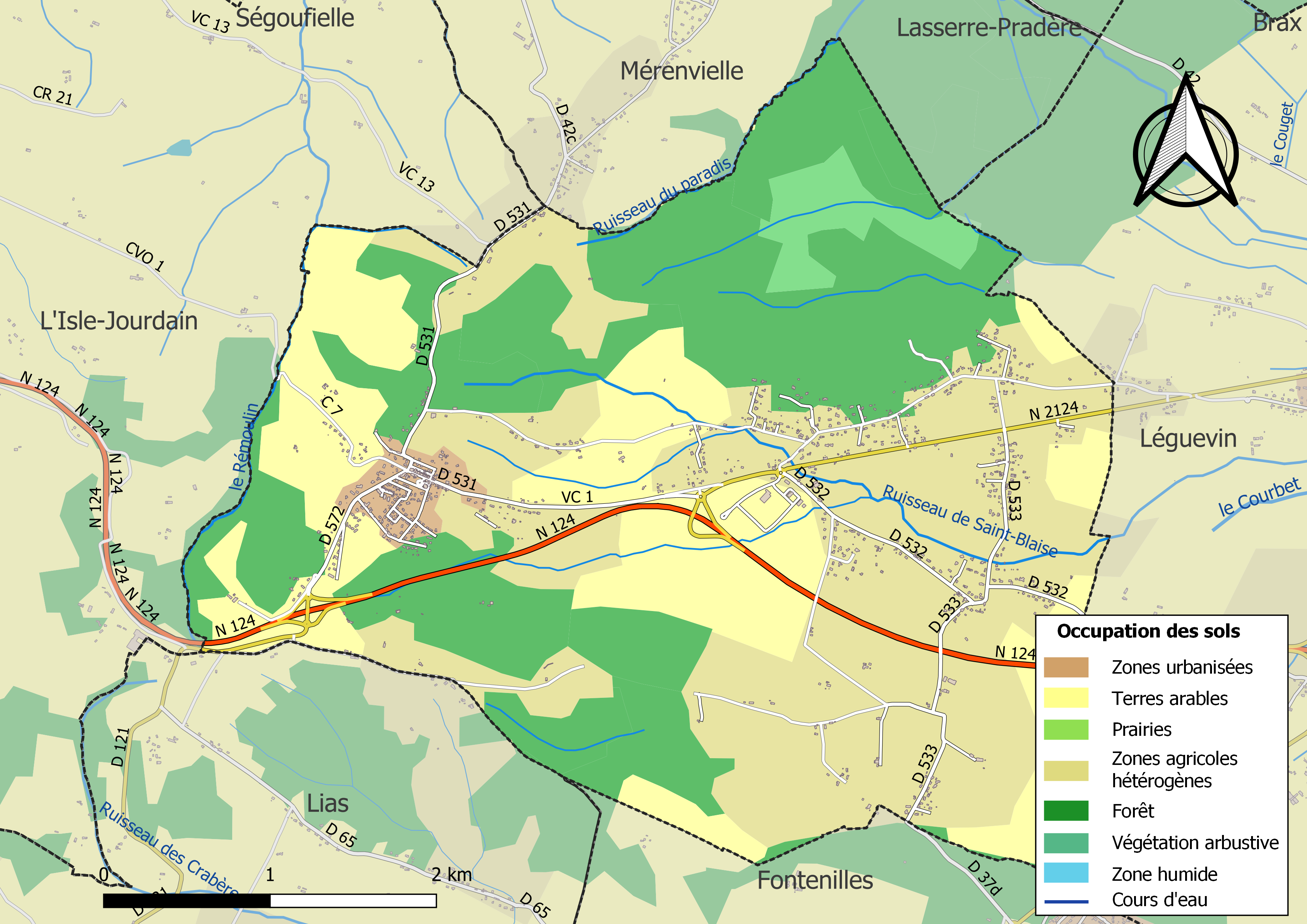
Map of infrastrucuture and land use in Pujaudran

=== Communication routes and transport ===
Access is via National Route 124 and by train at Brax-Léguevin or L'Isle-Jourdain stations.

Line 935 of the liO network connects the town to the Toulouse bus station and to Auch.

=== Major risks ===
The territory of the commune of Pujaudran is vulnerable to various natural hazards: meteorological (storms, thunderstorms, snow, extreme cold, heat waves, or drought) and earthquakes (very low seismicity). It is also exposed to technological and industrial risks. A website published by the BRGM (French Geological Survey) allows for a simple and quick assessment of the risks associated with a property located either by its address or by its plot number.

==== Natural risks ====
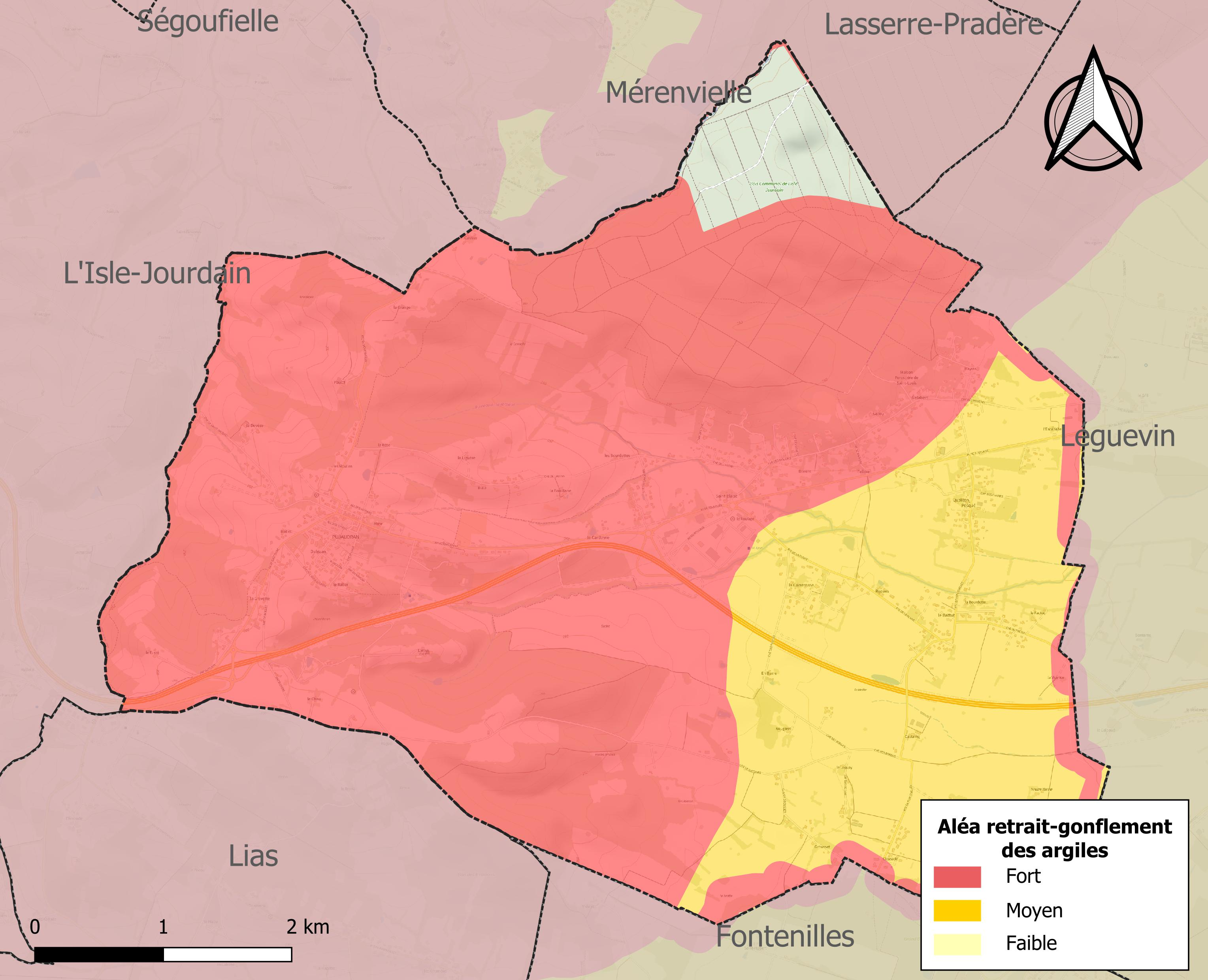
Map of the shrink-swell hazard zones of clay soils in Pujaudran.

The shrinking and swelling of clay soils can cause significant damage to buildings in the event of alternating periods of drought and rain. 96.4% of the commune's area is at medium or high risk (94.5% at the departmental level and 48.5% at the national level). Of the 588 buildings counted in the commune in 2019, all 100% are at medium or high risk, compared to 93% at the departmental level and 54% at the national level. A map of the national territory's exposure to clay soil shrinking and swelling is available on the BRGM website.

Furthermore, to better understand the risk of ground subsidence, the national inventory of underground cavities allows for the identification of those located within the commune.

The commune has been recognized as being in a state of natural disaster due to damage caused by floods and mudslides that occurred in 1987, 1999, 2009 and 2014. Regarding landslides, the commune has been recognized as being in a state of natural disaster due to damage caused by drought in 1989, 1991, 1993, 1998, 1999, 2002, 2003, 2008, 2011, 2015 and 2016 and by landslides in 1999.

==== Technological risks ====
The commune is exposed to industrial risk due to the presence on its territory of a company subject to the European SEVESO directive.

== Name ==
Pujaudran is composed of puj, an Occitan variant of puy, which derives from podium, meaning small hill. The village, perched 82 meters above the Léguevin terrace, justifies this name. Audran could be a man's name, possibly derived from the Germanic Aldramn (old ravens) or Aldric (old and powerful). The village of Pujaudran is situated at an altitude of 297 meters.

== History ==
At a place called Pargamousques, west of the village, an initial survey revealed a Gallo-Roman site. A route dating from 333 AD, linking Bordeaux to Jerusalem, crossed the commune of Pujaudran from west to east. The toponym of a locality may be of ancient origin: Tellère, spelled Teulères in the 17th century, means "place where tiles were made." The existence of a tile works at this location seems all the more plausible given the marl outcrops there.

In the 11th century, the pilgrimage to Santiago de Compostela developed, and Pujaudran happened to be situated on the Via Tolosana, which connected Arles to Puente la Reina (Spain).

At the end of the 13th century, the Antonine Order had a commandery with a church and hospital on the border between the communes of Pujaudran and L'Isle-Jourdain.

A document dating from 1304 mentions the presence of three hospitals in Pujaudran: Saint-Jacques, Saint-Blaise-Sainte-Marie-Madeleine, and Saint-Barthélemy. The Saint-Blaise hospital was located at the foot of the Pujaudran hill.

In the locality of Saint-Bretz, southeast of the village, approximately 3 km from the present-day village, a parish existed in the High Middle Ages. It is likely that this church was the parish church and that its patron saint was Saint Brice, before the construction of the current church. In the 17th century, during the reconstruction of the church after the destruction caused by the Wars of Religion, the name of Saint Pudentiana appears. According to the terms of Anne de Capmas's will, the church of Pujaudran and the Saint-Brice chapel were, in the 17th century, two separate buildings. The patron saint's festival takes place on 19 May, the feast day of Saint Pudentiana.

With the French Revolution of 1789, the Church's property was sold at auction on 9 January 1791, in Toulouse.

The remains of a tile factory that operated until the First World War can still be seen near National Route 124. Numerous marl pits supplied it with raw materials, and the tiles were fired using wood.

The Baillet mill is marked on the military map as "old mill." Its construction is believed to date back to 1808. The Chau mill is thought to date from 1825. In 1854, Pujaudran had four mills. Around 1934, the Chau mill was still in operation, as was the Peyrolières mill. Two mills that had belonged to Mr. Soulan were demolished in 1910.

At the time, the village boasted a carpenter, a wheelwright, a goatherd, a butcher, a blacksmith, a barber, a tobacconist, a baker, a shoemaker, a grocer, a café, the town hall, the school, the church, the rectory, and a coaching inn.

In 1912, the village had a boys' school and a girls' school. At their meeting on 17 October 1912, Mayor Justin Izard and his town council requested that, due to declining enrollment, there be only one co-educational school run by a female teacher.

In the village, a beautiful cast-iron cross, reinforced with iron arches, stands 1.5 meters tall on a substantial base. On 16 August, the Feast of Saint Roch, the men and women of the countryside, along with their flocks, gathered around this cross for a blessing.

The parish of Pujaudran is part of the Archdiocese of Auch. The church's bell tower, built into the wall, houses three bells and two pinnacles on either side and stands parallel to the nave, facing south. It appears this arrangement was chosen to minimize wind resistance.

On 22 July 1983, the following objects, preserved in the church, were also listed as historical monuments: two paintings from the late 18th century, a 16th-century copper collection plate, a statue of Saint Brice, bishop and former patron saint of the church, and Saint Pudentiana, patron saint of the church.

== Population and society ==
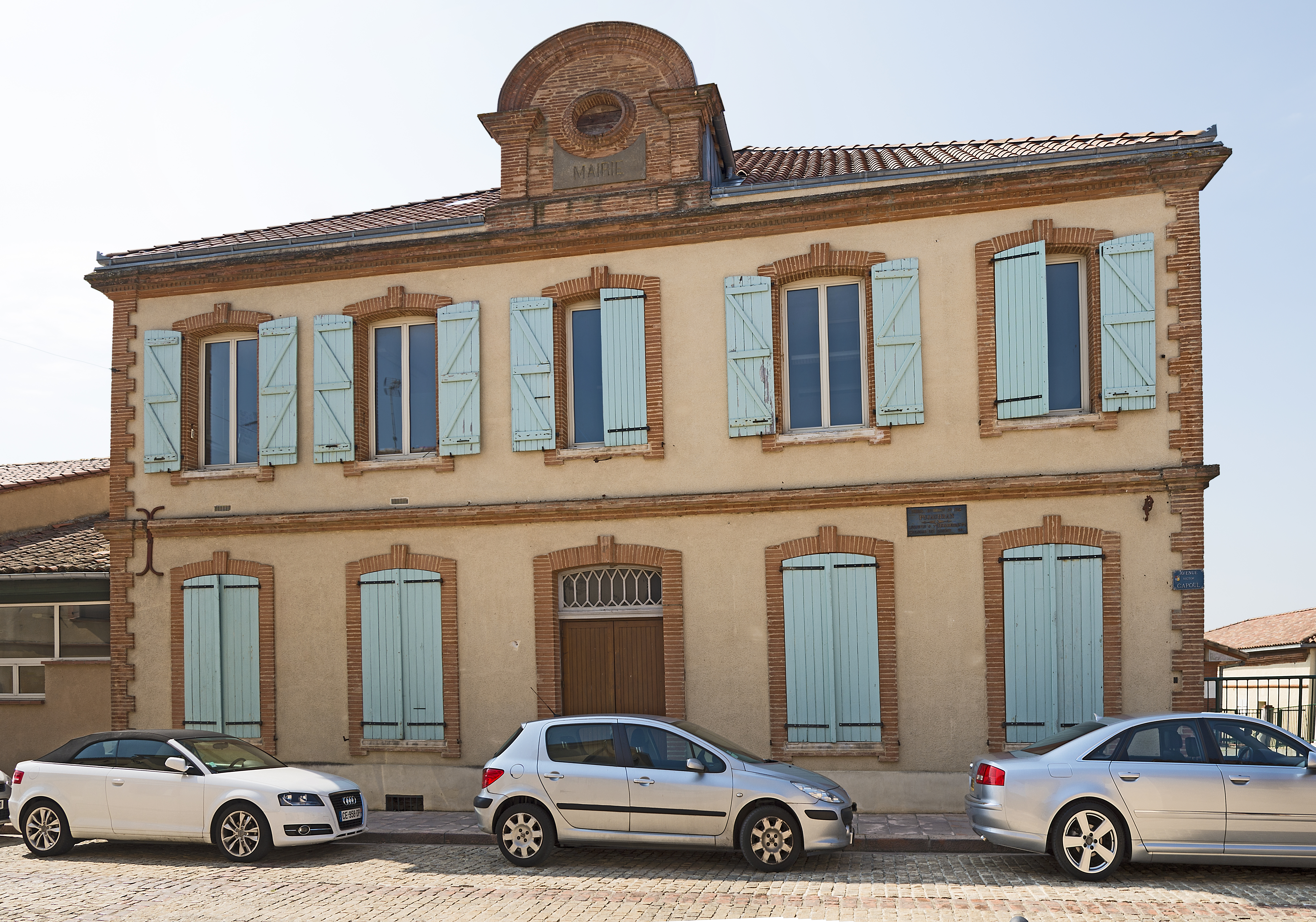
Town hall

Historical population
Year	Pop.	±% p.a.
1968	344	—
1975	422	+2.96%
1982	660	+6.60%
1990	816	+2.69%
1999	898	+1.07%
2007	1,244	+4.16%
2012	1,387	+2.20%
2017	1,523	+1.89%
2023	1,750	+2.34%
Source: INSEE

Its inhabitants are called Pujaudranais or Pujaudranaises in French.

=== Education ===
Pujaudran is part of the Toulouse school district.

Education is provided in the town by a preschool and a primary school.

== Economy ==
=== Revenue ===
In 2018 (Insee data published in September 2021), the commune had 598 tax households, comprising 1,597 people. The median disposable income per consumption unit was €27,820 (€20,820 in the department).

=== Employment ===
In 2018, the population aged 15 to 64 was 994, of whom 80.4% were in the labor force (75% employed and 5.4% unemployed) and 19.6% were not in the labor force. Since 2008, the municipal unemployment rate (as defined by the census) for those aged 15–64 has been lower than both the national and departmental rates.

The commune is part of the greater Toulouse area, as at least 15% of its working population commutes to the metropolitan area. It had 396 jobs in 2018, compared to 190 in 2013 and 151 in 2008. The number of employed residents in the commune was 756, representing an employment concentration of 52.4% and an activity rate of 66.3% for those aged 15 and over.

Of these 756 employed residents aged 15 and over, 80 work within the commune, representing 11% of the population. To get to work, 92.2% of residents use a personal or company four-wheeled vehicle, 1.4% use public transportation, 3.7% travel by two-wheeled vehicle, bicycle, or on foot, and 2.7% do not require transportation (working from home).

=== Non-agricultural activities ===
==== Sectors of activity ====
123 establishments were located in Pujaudran as of 31 December 2019.

The construction sector is predominant in the commune as it represents 17.9% of the total number of establishments in the commune (22 out of the 123 companies located in Pujaudran), compared to 14.6% at the departmental level.

==== Businesses and shops ====
The five companies headquartered within the commune that generated the most revenue in 2020 are:

- Air Support, aircraft and spacecraft repair and maintenance (€26,041k)
- Ateliers Etudes Realisations Electromeca - Aerem, industrial mechanics (€4,766k)
- Esbelt, wholesale (B2B) of various industrial supplies and equipment (€3,829k)
- Le Puits Saint Jacques, traditional restaurant (€1,819k)
- SARL Mazeries, electrical installation work in all types of premises (€525k)

Economic activity is relatively underdeveloped, and most residents work in the nearby Toulouse metropolitan area. The ongoing modernization of the RN 124 and the reduction in travel time to Toulouse are leading to significant real estate speculation. There are also several restaurants, including a pizzeria and a Michelin-starred restaurant.

A market takes place every Friday in the late afternoon.

=== Agriculture ===
The commune is located in the "Coteaux du Gers", a small agricultural region occupying the eastern part of the Gers department. In 2020, the technical and economic focus of agriculture in the commune was the cultivation of cereals and/or oilseed and protein crops.

The number of active farms headquartered in the commune fell from 26 in the 1988 agricultural census to 20 in 2000, then to 17 in 2010, and finally to 15 in 2020, representing a 42% decrease over 32 years. The same trend is observed at the departmental level, which lost 51% of its farms during this period. The utilized agricultural area within the municipality also decreased, from 718 hectares in 1988 to 559 hectares in 2020. Concurrently, the average utilized agricultural area per farm increased, from 28 to 37 hectares.

== Culture and sights ==
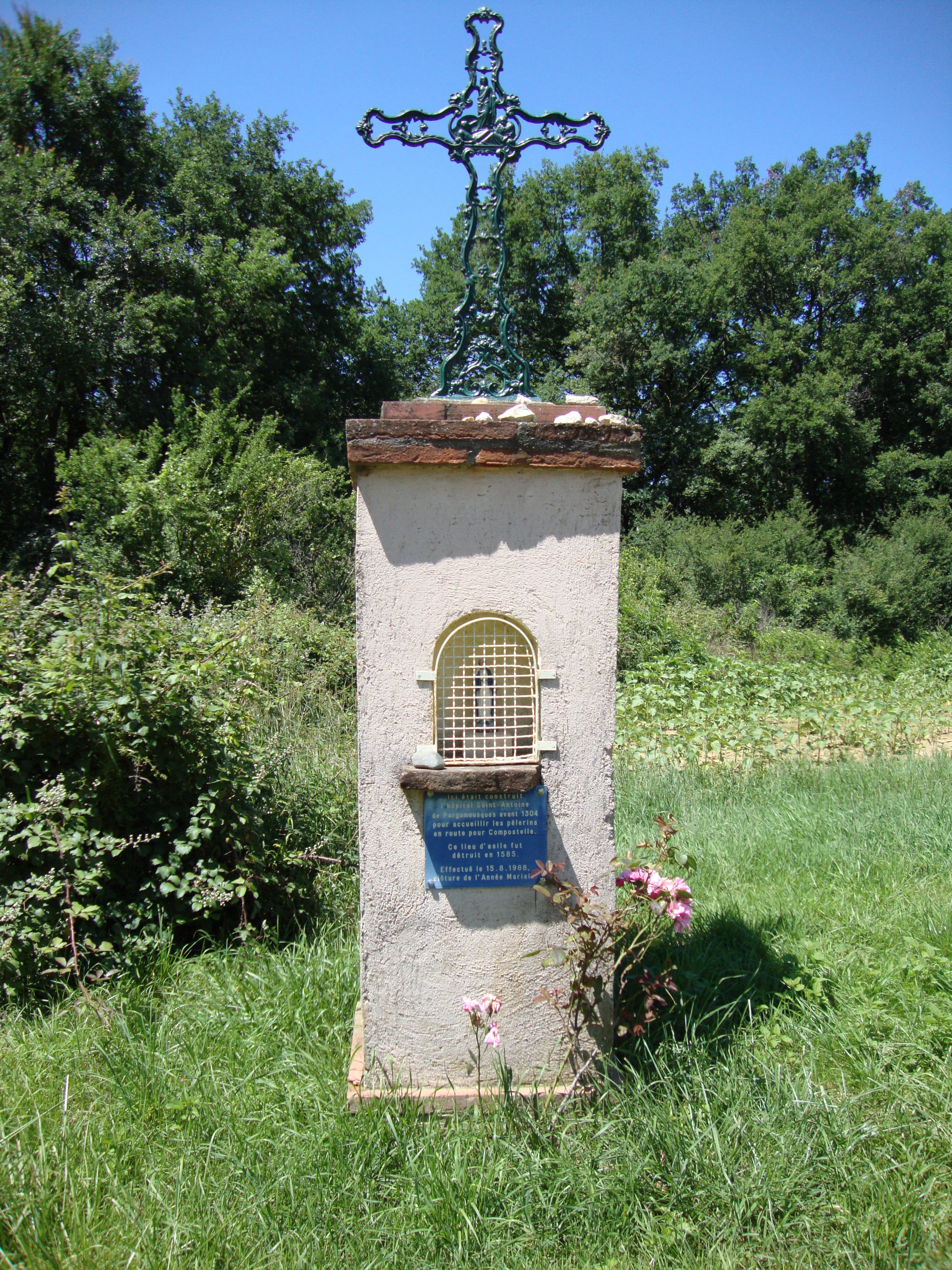
Oratory of the Virgin Mary commemorating Saint Anthony's Hospital

The Second Empire-style Château de Lartus, built in 1850, had several owners, including the tenor Victor Capoul.

Saint-Brice Church with a bell gable.

Oratory of the Virgin Mary commemorating the Saint-Antoine Hospital.

=== Heraldry ===
blazon1	Quartered: 1st, gules, a cross clechée, voided and pommée of twelve pieces or; 2nd, argent, a tree eradicated proper; 3rd, azure, a scallop or; 4th, or, a lion gules; overall a staff sable.

== Practical life ==
=== Culture ===
Media library, toy library, festival committee, theatre, dance.

=== Sports activities ===
Pétanque, martial arts, gymnastics, hunting, hiking.

== See also ==
- Communes of the Gers department
