= List of forests in France =

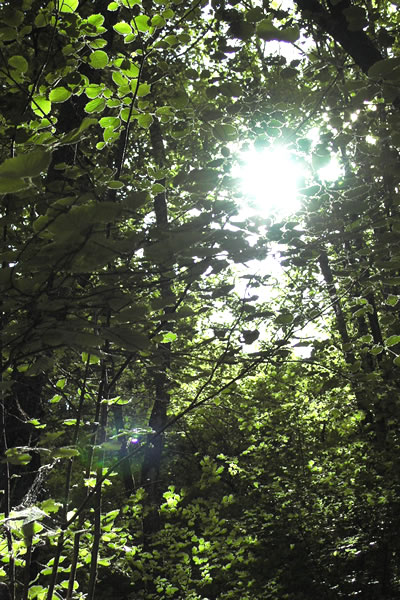
A temperate forest in France

Metropolitan France contains a total of 16,900,000 hectares (65,000 sq mi) of tree coverage, with 13,800,000 hectares (53,000 sq mi) considered to be forestry by the National Forest Inventory (IFN). Of those 13,800,000 hectares (53,000 sq mi), 8,700,000 hectares (34,000 sq mi) consist of leafy forests while the remaining 5,100,000 hectares (20,000 sq mi) consist of evergreen forests.

The majority of forestry in French overseas departments is found in French Guiana, which contains 7,500,000 hectares (29,000 sq mi) of forests.

3,700,000 hectares (14,000 sq mi) of forests in France are publicly owned, with the remaining 10,100,000 hectares (39,000 sq mi) being privately owned. Two-thirds of privately owned forests are larger than 10 hectares (25 acres), and 48% are larger than 25 hectares (62 acres).

The largest forests in France by region are as follows:

== Alsace ==
- Forêt de la Hardt (or de la Harth) (130 km^{2})
- Forêt du Donon
- Forêt de Haguenau (137 km^{2})
- Forêt d'Obernai
- Forêt de Sélesta-Illwald (15 km^{2})

== Aquitaine ==
- Forêt d'Iraty (173 km^{2})
- Forêt des Landes (10,000 km^{2})
- Forêt de Lège et Garonne

== Auvergne ==
- Forêt de Gros-Bois
- Forêt de Marigny
- Forêt de Messarges
- Forêt des Prieurés Maladier
- Forêt de Tronçais (106 km^{2})

== Brittany ==
- Forêt de Brocéliande
- Forêt de Carnoët
- Forêt de Coëtquen
- Forêt du Cranou
- Forêt de Fougères (16 km^{2})
- Forêt de Fréau
- Forêt de Huelgoat (6 km^{2})
- Forêt de Hunaudaye
- Forêt de La Guerche
- Forêt de Liffré
- Forêt de Mesnil
- Forêt de Paimpont (80 km^{2})
- Forêt de Rennes in Liffré
- Forêt de Saint-Aubin-du-Cormier
- Forêt de Lanouée (32 km^{2}, private)

== Burgundy ==
- Forêt d'Arcy
- Forêt de la Bertrange (76 km^{2})
- Forêt de Borne
- Forêt de Champornot
- Forêt de Châtillon (88 km^{2})
- Forêt Chenue
- Forêt domaniale de Cîteaux (35 km^{2})
- Forêt des Courgeonneries, Forêt des Dames
- Forêt de Donzy
- Forêt de Flavigny
- Forêt de Fontenay
- Forêt des Minimes
- Forêt de Saulieu
- Forêt de Vauluisant, also known as the Forêt de Lancy

== Centre ==
- Forêt d'Amboise
- Forêt de Bercé (55 km^{2})
- Forêt de Blois
- Forêt de Boulogne (40 km^{2})
- Forêt de Bruadan
- Parc de Chambord
- Forêt de Chaumont
- Forêt de Cheverny
- Forêt de Chinon
- Forêt du Choussy
- Forêt de Gâtine
- Forêt d'Ivoy
- Forêt de Loches
- Forêt de Moléans
- Forêt de Montargis
- Forêt de Montrichard
- Forêt d'Orléans (340 km^{2})
- Forêt de Preuilly
- Forêt de Russy
- Forêt de Saint-Palais
- Forêt de Vierzon
- Forêt de Villandry
- Forêt de Vouzeron

== Champagne-Ardenne ==
- Forêt d'Arc-en-Barrois (100 km^{2})
- Forêt des Ardennes
- Forêt d'Argonne
- Forêt d'Aumont
- Forêt de Bassican
- Bois de Chamois
- Forêt de Clairvaux
- Forêt de Corgebin
- Forêt de Crogny
- Forêt de Cussangy
- Forêt du Der
- Bois du Devois
- Forêt des Dhuits
- Forêt de l'Étoile
- Bois des Fays
- Forêt de La Garenne
- Bois du Hayet
- Forêt de la Montagne de Reims (190 km^{2})
- Bois des Montclaims
- Forêt du Mont-Dieu
- Forêt d'Orient (130 km^{2})
- Forêt d'Othe (155 km^{2})
- Forêt de Retz (130 km^{2})
- Forêt de Romilly
- Forêt du Temple
- Forêt de Signy
- Forêt du Val

== Corsica ==
- Forêt d'Aïtone
- Forêt de Calenzana
- Forêt de Chiavari
- Forêt du Fango, Forêt de Lucio
- Forêt de Filosorma
- Forêt de l'Onca
- Forêt de l'Ospédale
- Forêt de Tartagine
- Forêt de Tavignano
- Forêt de Valdo-Niello
- Forêt de Vizzavona (14 km^{2})
- Forêt de Zonza

== Franche-Comté ==
- Forêt de Champlitte
- Forest of Chaux (130 km^{2})
- Forêt de Faroz
- Forêt des Hauts-Bois
- Forêt de la Joux (27 km^{2})

== Île-de-France ==
- Bois de Boulogne
- Bois de la Tour du Lay
- Bois de Villiers, Bois de la Bucaille
- Bois de Vincennes
- Forest of Alluets
- Forest of Armainvilliers (50 km^{2})
- Forest of Carnelle (9.75 km^{2})
- Forest of Fontainebleau (250 km^{2})
- Forest of l'Isle-Adam (15 km^{2})
- Forest of Jouy
- Forest of Marly (20 km^{2})
- Forest of Meudon
- Forest of Moisson
- Forest of Montmorency (22 km^{2})
- Forest of Notre-Dame
- Forest of Rambouillet (220 km^{2})
- Forest of Rouvray
- Forest of Saint-Germain-en-Laye (35 km^{2})
- Forest of Sénart (30 km^{2})

== Languedoc-Roussillon ==
- Bois de Fontanilles
- Forêt de Fontfroide
- Forêt de Mercoire
- Forêt des écrivains combattants
- Forêt du Haut-Vallespir (100 km^{2})
- Forêt du Mont-Aigoual (150 km^{2})

== Limousin ==
- Forêt des Cars
- Forêt de Lastours
- Forêt de Châteauneuf
- Forêt de Rochechouart
- Forêt de Viellecour

== Lorraine ==
- Forêt de Darney (80 km^{2})
- Forêt de Gerardmer (48 km^{2})
- Forêt de Haye (70 km^{2})
- Forêt de Verdun (95 km^{2})

== Midi-Pyrénées ==
- Forêt d'Aubrac
- Forêt de Barousse
- Forêt de La Garrigue
- Forêt de Grésigne
- Forêt du Haut Comminges
- Forêt de la Loubatière
- Forêt de Montaud
- Forêt du Sidobre
- Forêt de Bouconne (27 km^{2})

== Nord-Pas-de-Calais ==
- Forêt d'Éperlecques
- Forêt de Mormal (90 km^{2})
- Forêt de Raismes-Saint-Amand-Wallers

== Normandy ==
=== Lower Normandy ===
- Forêt des Andaines (ou des Andennes) (55 km^{2})
- Forêt de Bellême (24 km^{2})
- Forêt communale de Cerisy-Belle-Etoile
- Forêt communale de Sainte-Honorine-La-Guillaume
- Forêt d'Écouves (75 km^{2})
- Forêt de Longny
- Forêt du Perche
- Forêt de Perseigne (51 km^{2})
- Forêt de Réno-Valdieu (55.12 km^{2})
- Forêt de Vidamme

=== Upper Normandy ===
- Forêt des Andelys
- Forêt de Beaumont
- Forêt de Breteuil
- Forêt de Brotonne (67.5 km^{2})
- Forêt de Conches
- Forêt d'Eawy
- Forêt d'Eu (93 km^{2})
- Forêt d'Évreux
- Forêt de Louviers
- Forêt de Lyons (106 km^{2})
- Forêt de Montfort
- Forêt de Roumare
- Forêt de Rouvray
- Forêt de Vernon
- Forêt Verte

== Pays de la Loire ==
- Bois des Vallons
- Forêt de Bercé
- Forêt de Bonnétable
- Forêt de Boulogne
- Bois de Bourgon, Boi d'Hermet
- Forêt de Fontevraud, Bois de Couziers, Bois de Roiffé
- Forêt de la Flèche
- Forêt du Gâvre (45 km^{2})
- Forêt de la Grande Charnie
- Forêt de la Groulaie
- Forêt de Guînes
- Forêt de Juigné (21 km^{2})
- Forêt de La Roche-Bernard
- Forêt de Machecoul
- Forêt du Mans
- Forêt de Mayenne
- Forêt de Merven-Vouvant
- Forêt de Milly
- Forêt de Multonne
- Forêt de Nuaillé, Forêt de Vezins
- Forêt de Pail
- Forêt domaniale des Pays-de-Monts
- Forêt de Rihout-Clairmarais
- Forêt de Saumur

== Picardy ==
- Forêt de Compiègne (145 km^{2})
- Forêt de Chantilly (65 km^{2})
- Forêt de Crécy
- Forêt d'Ermenonville, Forêt de Chailly (64 km^{2})
- Forêt d'Halatte (62 km^{2})
- Forêt de Hez
- Forêt de Hirson, Forêt de Saint-Michel
- Forêt de Laigne
- Forêt de Nouvion
- Forêt de Retz (130 km^{2})
- Forêt de Saint-Gobain

== Poitou-Charentes ==
- Forêt de La Coubre, Forêt de Saint-Trojan
- Forêt de Saint-Sauvant

== Provence-Alpes-Côte d'Azur ==
- Forêt des Dentelles de Montmirail
- Forêt de l'Esterel
- Forêt des Maures (80 km^{2})
- Forêt de Menton
- Forêt du Mont-Ventoux (800 km^{2})
- Forêt de la Sainte-Baume (1.4 km^{2})
- Forêt du Tanneron

== Rhône-Alpes ==
- Forêt d'Arc (11225 km^{2})
- Forêt de Bonnevaux
- Forêt de Chambaran
- Forêt de la Grande Chartreuse (83 km^{2})
- Forêt de Saou (en partie domaniale)
- Forêt du Semnoz
- Forêt du Vercors

== Overseas ==
=== Guadeloupe ===
- 650 km^{2} (390 km^{2})

=== French Guiana ===
- 74,500 km^{2}

=== Martinique ===
- 403 km^{2}

=== Réunion ===
2512 km^{2}

- Forêt de Bébour
- Forêt de Bélouve
- Forêt des Bénares
- Forêt de Bois Blanc
- Forêt du Cratère
- Forêt de la Crête
- Forêt de l'Étang-Salé
- Forêt de Grand Coude
- Forêt du Grand Matarum
- Forêt des Makes
- Forêt de la Mare à Joseph
- Forêt Mourouvin
- Forêt du Piton Papangue
- Forêt de la Plaine des Lianes
- Forêt de la Rivière des Remparts
- Forêt du Tapcal
- Forêt du Tévelave
- Forêt de Villeneuve
