= Cornélie Lebon-de Brambilla =

French engineer (1767–1812)

- Born: Françoise-Thérèse-Cornélie de Brambilla; 16 January 1767; Ypres, France
- Died: 2 September 1812 (aged 45); Paris, France
- Occupation: Engineer
- Known for: Early urban gas lighting

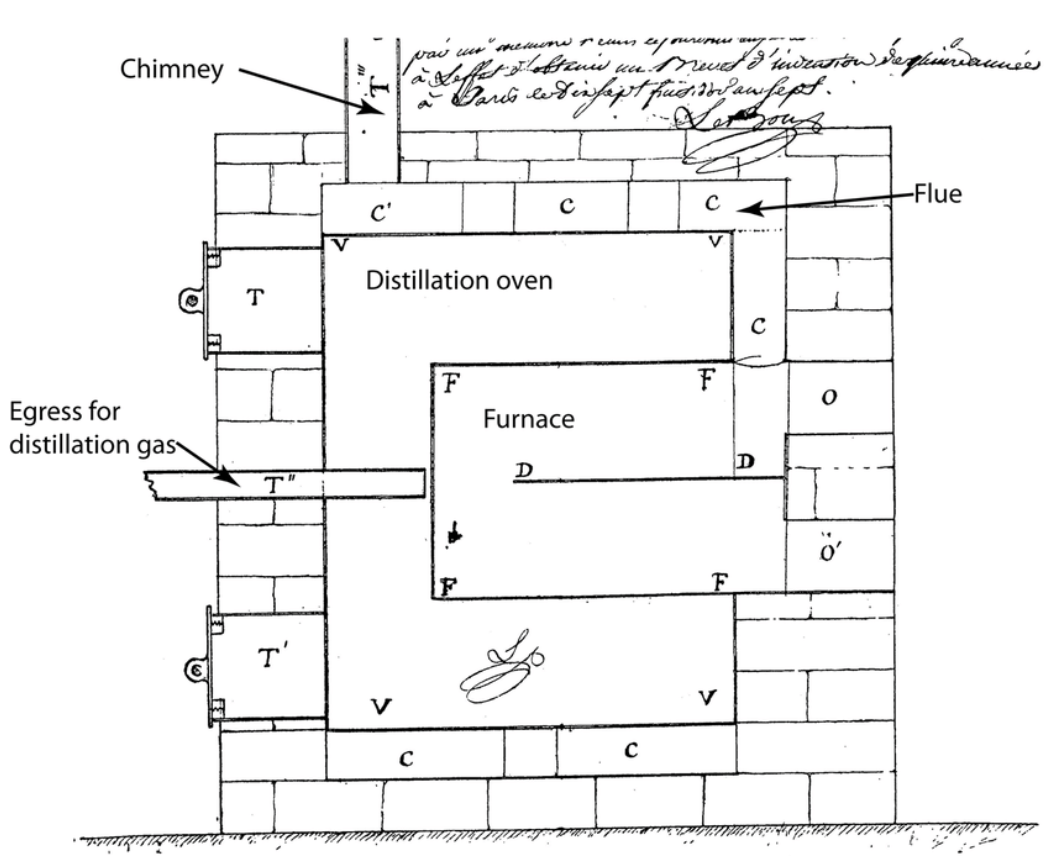
The 1799 patent by Philippe Lebon to create the gas for the themolampe was the basis of the letter to Bonaparte.

Cornélie Lebon (née de Brambilla) (16 January 1767 – 2 September 1812), was a French engineer who was also proficient in chemistry. During the French Revolutionary period, her husband Philippe Lebon (1767–1804), invented a process for distilling gas from wood for gas lighting. Following his mysterious death in 1804 in connection with Napoleon's coronation, she valiantly continued her his work while raising a small child and coping with substantial debts. Her devotion to the engineering project was quite unusual for a women of the times. In 1811, she published a memoir detailing Lebon's achievements, noting that she had continued to improve the thermolamp approach. She was subsequently awarded the Prix des arts chimiques (chemical arts prize) for bringing her husband's work to the attention of the authorities and was also awarded an annual annuity for her services.

Cornélie Lebon died in September 1812 unable to contribute further to Lebon's work after suffering difficulties with associates who had turned against her.

Largely forgotten over the years, interest in her achievements has recently been revived thanks to a proposal from AFEGAZ-COPAGAZ in early 2026 that her name should be added to the Eiffel Tower.

== Early life and education ==
Françoise-Thérèse-Cornélie (known as Cornélie) de Brambilla was born on 16 January 1767 (or possibly in 1772) in Ypres, Belgium, into a family of artists and doctors from Padua and Milan. She appears to have had a wide education in line with the possibilities available for girls of her times. In February 1792, she married the civil engineer and inventor Philippe Lebon (d'Humbersin) in Angoulême and took his surname. They had two children together. Their first, Henri-Hippolyte was born on 4 November 1792. Their second, Charles, was born ten years later.

Her husband, in addition to his work at the Ponts et Chaussées (French bridges and roads department) in Angoulême, was an inventor. He developed a type of gas suitable for lighting which he patented in 1799. As enthusiastic as her husband about the invention, Cornélie used all the funds in her dowry to support his experiments.

When Philippe Lebon was struggling to receive funding from the French Republican government for his work, Cornélie Lebon travelled to Paris to put the family's case. One of her letters survives, dated 22 Messidor Year VII (10 July 1799) of the French Republic:

The wife of citizen Lebon to the citizen Minister of the Interior.

It is neither charity nor mercy that I ask of you, but justice. For two months, I have been languishing 120 leagues from my household. Do not force a father to leave, through further delay and lack of means, a state to which he has sacrificed everything... Have consideration for our position, citizen; it is overwhelming and my request is just. There is more than one reason to persuade me that my approach will not be fruitless with a minister who makes it his law and duty to be just.

Yours sincerely, Your devoted fellow citizen, ‘Madame Lebon, née de Brambilla.

Realising that the process for producing the gas yielded tar, useful for constructing watertight ship hulls, the minister granted her request and charged Lebon to manage the concession in the Rouvray Forest as a source of supply. The production of five quintals of tar a day was the expected output. The Lebon family appear to have lived on site at the forest factory. On a stormy night, the roof blew away, and they woke under the open sky.

== Career ==
As a result of Cornélie Lebon's request, a decree dated 9 Frucidor year IX (27 August 1801) was issued by the first consul (Napoleon Bonaparte), confirming recognition of the existence of the thermolamp and granting Philippe Lebon a timber concession, requiring him to produce five quintals of tar per day in the Rouvray forest.

Later that year, the Lebon couple rented the Hôtel de Seignelay at 11 Rue de Bercy in Faubourg Saint-Antoine, Paris. They installed a thermolamp arrangement and decorated the house, courtyard and gardens with jets of light, opening the house to the public to demonstrate the possibilities of heating and lighting using hydrogen-rich gas extracted from wood by means of pyrolysis. The gas was stored in a submerged bell jar, serving as an early gasometer. It was then pumped to lighting fixtures known as themolamps. The couple firmly believed that gas lighting would transform urban life, as it was more reliable and more hygienic than oil lamps and candles.

Just as interest was growing in lighting gas, Phillippe Lebon was found dead on 1 December 1804 beside a tree on the as yet underdeveloped Champs-Èlysées. Having traveled to Paris for the coronation of Napoleon, he had been stabbed several times but could not be saved.

=== Developments following her husband's death ===
While raising her two children and managing her husband's debts, Cornélie Lebon applied her abilities as an engineer and a chemist to the further development of gas lighting. Now ruised by a dishonest business associate, she had to give up management of the Rouvray Forest concession, faced with a debt of 8,000 francs resulting from insufficient business. Hoping to encourage further funding, she suggested thermolamps could be used by the navy and suggested a thermolamp plant could be created near Le Havre. Denis Decrès, the minister, refused support on the ground that the development would not be economically viable..

On 21 February 1808, her younger son, Charles, died aged six. She nevertheless was able to secure support from scientists including the Belgian industrialist Ryss-Poncelet, but it later turned out that he was not acting in good faith. She also received support from her son Henri Hippolyte, an École polytechnique graduate who was to enjoy a successful military career.

In January 1811, relying on the support of several associates she considered to be reliable, Cornëlie Lebon rented a mansion at 11 rue de Bercy in the Faubourg Saint-Antoine. Drawing on the earlier experience with her husband in 1801 at the Hôtel de Seigneley, she installed a thermolamp there in order to demonstrate the effects of gas lighting both inside the house and in the gardens. She was able to benefit from the presence of Prince Repnin who was visiting Paris. The Courrier de lÉurope reported on 22 January 1811 that Prince Repnin and his distinguished associates had played an active part in what turned out to be a highly-successful demonstration.

On 23 April 1811, wishing to bring her husband's invention to the attention of the authorities, Cornélie Lebon published a memoir on the distillation of wood. She submitted the memoir to the Société d'encouragement pour l'industrie nationale (Society for the Encouragement of National Industry), with a covering note explaining that while she hoped to bring the economic benefits of her husband's work to the attention of the pertinent authorities, she was happy to have been able to improve the invention by simplifying the equipment and increasing the number of products and applications. (Guidée par l’espoir de réveiller votre précieuse attention sur la manière économique inventée par Lebon de procéder à la distillation des combustibles et sur l'utilité des produits qu'on en retire, j'ai pris la très humble liberté d'essayer de remettre sous vos yeux, l'invention de mon mari. J'ai été assez heureuse pour la perfectionner, simplifier les appareils en multiplier les applications et augmenter les produits).

Her memoir was well received and was said to have clearly confirmed that Lobon was the investor of the thermolamp. It was suggested that the successes of hydrogen-rich coal gas lighting by the English should also be developed in France.

As a result of her memoir, on 4 September 1811, she received an award for "arts chimiques" (chemical arts) from the Société d’Encouragement pour l’Industrie Nationale (Society for the Encouragement of National Industry). The following December, the Minister of the Interior, Jean-Pierre, Count of Montalivet, sent Lebon a decree granting her a life pension of 1,200 francs, specifically for her experience of products resulting from the distillation of wood, as "widow of Sieur Lebon, inventor of the thermolamp".

Lebon died in Paris on 2 September 1812, aged only 45, in her apartment at 3 rue Neuve des petits champs. Struck by difficulties caused by associates who had turned against her, she was no longer able to continue work on the thermolamp since the successes of 1811. She is buried in a modest tomb at the Père Lachaise Cemetery. Her elder son Henri-Hyppolyte was later buried beside her.

== Aftermath ==
Cornélie Lebon had called on legal experts to challenge Friedrich Albrecht Winzer, later known as Winsor, who claimed to have discovered gas lighting. Following Lebon's death, in 1815 Winsor founded the first gas company in Paris. His name quickly became associated with the rollout of gas lighting in France with the result that Philippe and Cornélie Lebon were soon forgotten.

Although there is no mention of her scientific work in her husband's memoirs, Lebon played a key role in the early attempts to develop gas lighting. Her influence was felt particularly in Liège, Belgium, where she installed one of the first gas lighting demonstrations at the premises of the Société Libre d'Émulation. It is nevertheless thanks to Cornélie Lebon that we have a detailed account of her husband's achievements, without which Philippe Lebon might not have been recognised as the inventor of gas lighting.

== Honours and awards ==
- Prix des Arts chimiques in 1811, from the Société d’Encouragement pour l’Industrie Nationale (Society for the Encouragement of National Industry).

In 2026, thanks to a proposal from AFEGAZ-COPAGAZ, Cornélie Lebon was announced as one of 72 historical women in STEM whose names have been proposed to be added to the 72 men already celebrated on the Eiffel Tower. The plan was announced by the Mayor of Paris, Anne Hidalgo following the recommendations of a committee led by Isabelle Vauglin of Femmes et Sciences and Jean-François Martins, representing the operating company which runs the Eiffel Tower.
