= Manéglise =

- Commune
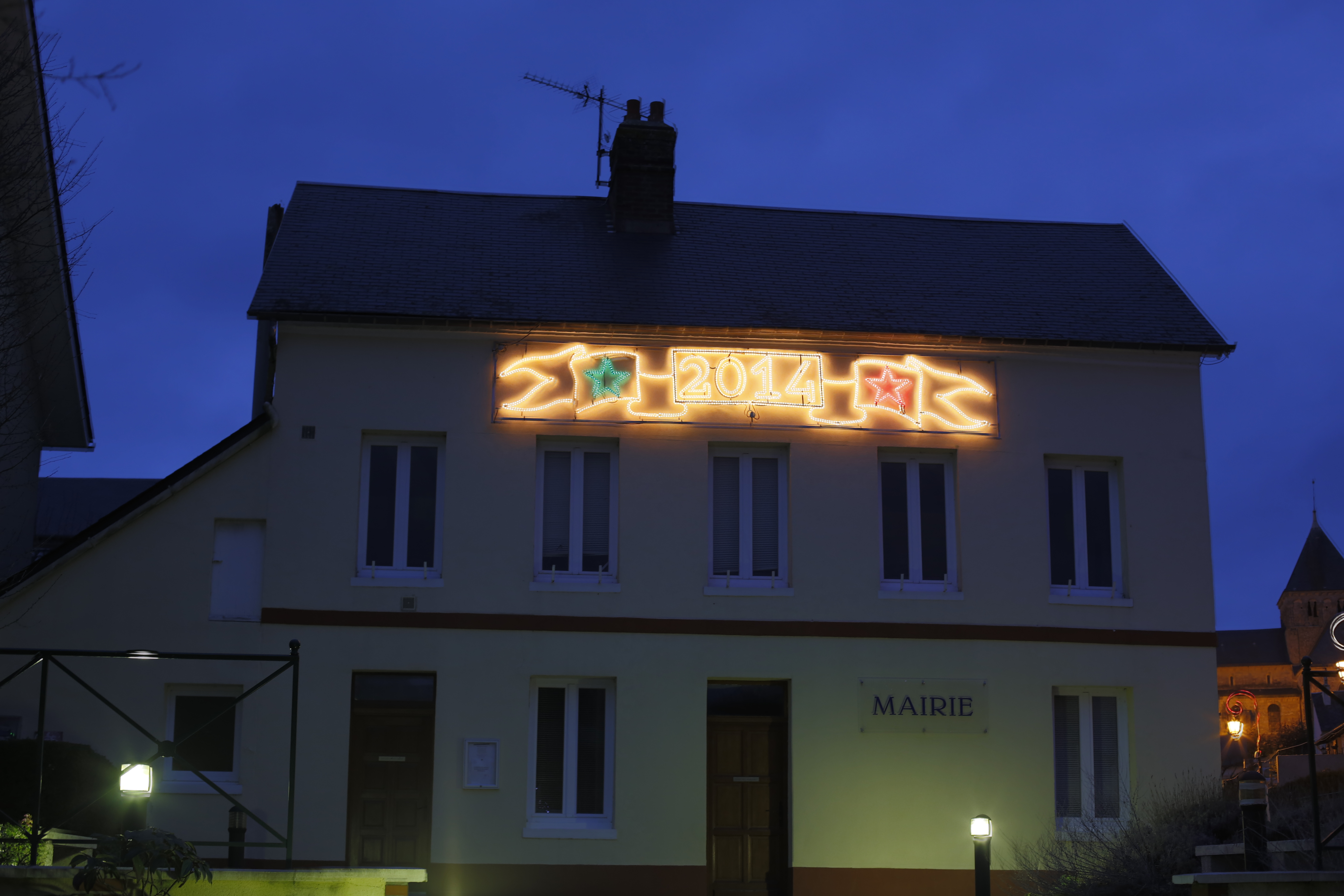
- The town hall in Manéglise

- Coat of arms
- Location of Manéglise
- Location within France Location within Normandy
- Coordinates: 49°34′02″N 0°15′18″E
- Country: France
- Region: Normandy
- Department: Seine-Maritime
- Arrondissement: Le Havre
- Canton: Octeville-sur-Mer
- Intercommunality: Le Havre Seine Métropole

Government
  - Mayor (2026–32): Marc-Antoine Tetrel
- Area^{1}: 8.35 km^{2} (3.22 sq mi)
- Elevation: 66 m (217 ft)
- Highest elevation: 118 m (387 ft)
- Lowest elevation: 48 m (157 ft)
- Population (2023): 1,292
  - Density: 155/km^{2} (401/sq mi)
- Time zone: UTC+01:00 (CET)
  - Summer (DST): UTC+02:00 (CEST)
- INSEE/Postal code: 76404 /76133
- ^{1} French Land Register data, which excludes lakes, ponds, glaciers > 1 km^{2} (0.386 sq mi or 247 acres) and river estuaries.

Manéglise (French pronunciation: [maneɡliz]) is a commune in the Seine-Maritime department in the Normandy region in northern France.

== Geography ==
A farming village in the Pays de Caux situated some 7 miles (11 km) north of Le Havre, at the junction of the D926 and D52 roads.

== Heraldry ==
Arms of Manéglise	The arms of Manéglise are blazoned : Azure, the local church between in base 3 buckles Or, and in chief a chapé gules, the dexter one charged with 2 stalks of wheat in saltire, the sinister one with 2 leopards Or, overall a chevronel (??) argent on the line of division.

== Population ==
Historical population
Year	Pop.	±% p.a.
1968	513	—
1975	604	+2.36%
1982	912	+6.06%
1990	1,051	+1.79%
1999	1,190	+1.39%
2007	1,151	−0.42%
2012	1,216	+1.10%
2017	1,261	+0.73%
2023	1,292	+0.41%
Source: INSEE

== Places of interest ==
- The church of St. Germain, dating from the eleventh century.
- A sixteenth-century chapel.
- The château des Hellandes, built in 1904 by Monsieur Levesque on the site of a 17th-century manorhouse. It was used as a hospital during World War I.

== Twinned with ==
- Pecq, Belgium
- Saint-Épiphane, Canada
- Swanmore, United Kingdom

== See also ==
- Communes of the Seine-Maritime department
