= Forêt de Rouvray =

Coordinates: 49°19′57″N 0°59′50″E

The once vast Forêt de Rouvray (French pronunciation: [fɔʁɛ də ʁuvʁɛ], "Forest of Rouvray", from Gallo-Romance ROBORETU “oak wood″ or more probably French rouvre “sessile oak” and old suffix -ey (ill spelled as -ay, modern -aie), meaning a “collection of the same trees”) was a forest that extended from west of Paris in the Île-de-France region westwards into Normandy, virtually unbroken, threaded by the winding loops of the River Seine, traversed by forest traces and dotted with isolated woodland hamlets, as far as Rouen. A rural relict is the 5 100 ha of the protected Forêt Domaniale de la Londe-Rouvray, at Les Essarts, Normandy, near Saint-Étienne-du-Rouvray, south of Rouen, on an upland massif above the left bank of the Seine, which makes a wide arc enclosing it. On the right bank, to the west, is what is left of the Forêt de Roumare (the Rouennais), another former royal forest.

== History ==
According to his early biographers, it was while riding in the forest of Rouvray that William the Conqueror decided to assert his rights to the throne of England.

The old-growth forest that extended to the floodplain of the Seine was incrementally cleared by the monks of a congregation established about 1154 at the priory of Grammont, facing the city from the left bank of the Seine. Forest was cleared also at the abbey of Saint-Julien and others. At the end near Paris, in 1424 the abbess of Montmartre defended the abbey's traditional right to forest products in the stretch of "forêt de Rouvray" that is now the Bois de Boulogne.

In February 1389, Hector de Chartres was named maître des eaux et des forêts in Normandy and Picardy by Charles VI of France and was charged with verifying and authentifying the old customs of the king's forests users. Along with Jean de Garancières, who was also maître des eaux et forêts at the time, he began in 1402 the general inspection of the king's forests in Normandy. According to a recent publication by Ch. Maneuvrier, D. Gardelle and B. Nardeux, it was Jean de Garancières, and not Hector de Chartres, who visited Rouvray, along with most forest in the region.

However, by the beginning of the sixteenth century, the forest had been decimated: a municipal decree of Rouen, of 24 April 1506, estimated, perhaps with some exaggeration, that if demands were met, within the space of three years the forest of Rouvray would be gone; the pressures came from timber needed for house construction and shipbuilding downstream, and for charcoal. In 1613 a decree from the Conseil du Roi specified that the products of Rouvray and other woods nearby should be limited to the uses of Rouen, but in the seventeenth century, tile-works and pottery kilns set up round the edges of the forest were consuming its timber for fuel. The oaks were replaced by birch; but fern, bracken and broom invaded the depleted soils, and the aristocratic owners were replaced by local bourgeois who saw the woodlands as a resource.

At the time of the reordering of the badly cut-over forest in 1669, it was estimated that the oldest of the trees was about twenty years old, with most growth ranging from eight to fourteen years. Little was done to stem the erosion of the forests; the wars of Louis XIV took their share of timber of any size, and the cold winters of the "Little Ice Age" required firewood for Rouen. By 1750, three of every eight arpents (3 ha) of "forest" was actually irremediably turned to open wasteland and heath on the impoverished soils. That was the year that Nicolas Roneau, Grand maître des eaux et de forêts began planting open heath with chestnuts and pines— the first planted pine woodlands in Normandy— as a first step towards a managed forest.

The Revolution saw the woodlands informally exploited once more, as a "public good". In 1803, engineer Phillipe Lebon was granted a concession of a section of pine forest to produce tar for the French Navy, which later passed to his widow Cornélie Lebon-de Brambilla.

The introduction of British coal for industrial purposes in the nineteenth century was what really saved the remaining reserves of woodland. In the twentieth century, the Second World War, the construction of highways, the new phenomena of forest fires and acid rain, which selectively weakened conifers, have also taken their toll. Nevertheless, a third of the territory of the Rouennais (12,150 hectares or 30,000 acres) is wooded, in one of the most densely forested regions of northwest France.

== Modern day ==
Today the remnant termed the forêt de La Londe-Rouvray, "La Londe" reserved for the western section, is protected by a decree of 18 March 1993, supplemented by a decree of 14 September 2006.

A public, informative demonstration Maison des forêts, built by Agglo de Rouen (the agglomération rouennaise) to Haute qualité environnementale (HQE, "High environmental quality") standards, was opened in March 2008.

== See also ==
- List of forests in France
