= Cauville-sur-Mer =

- Commune
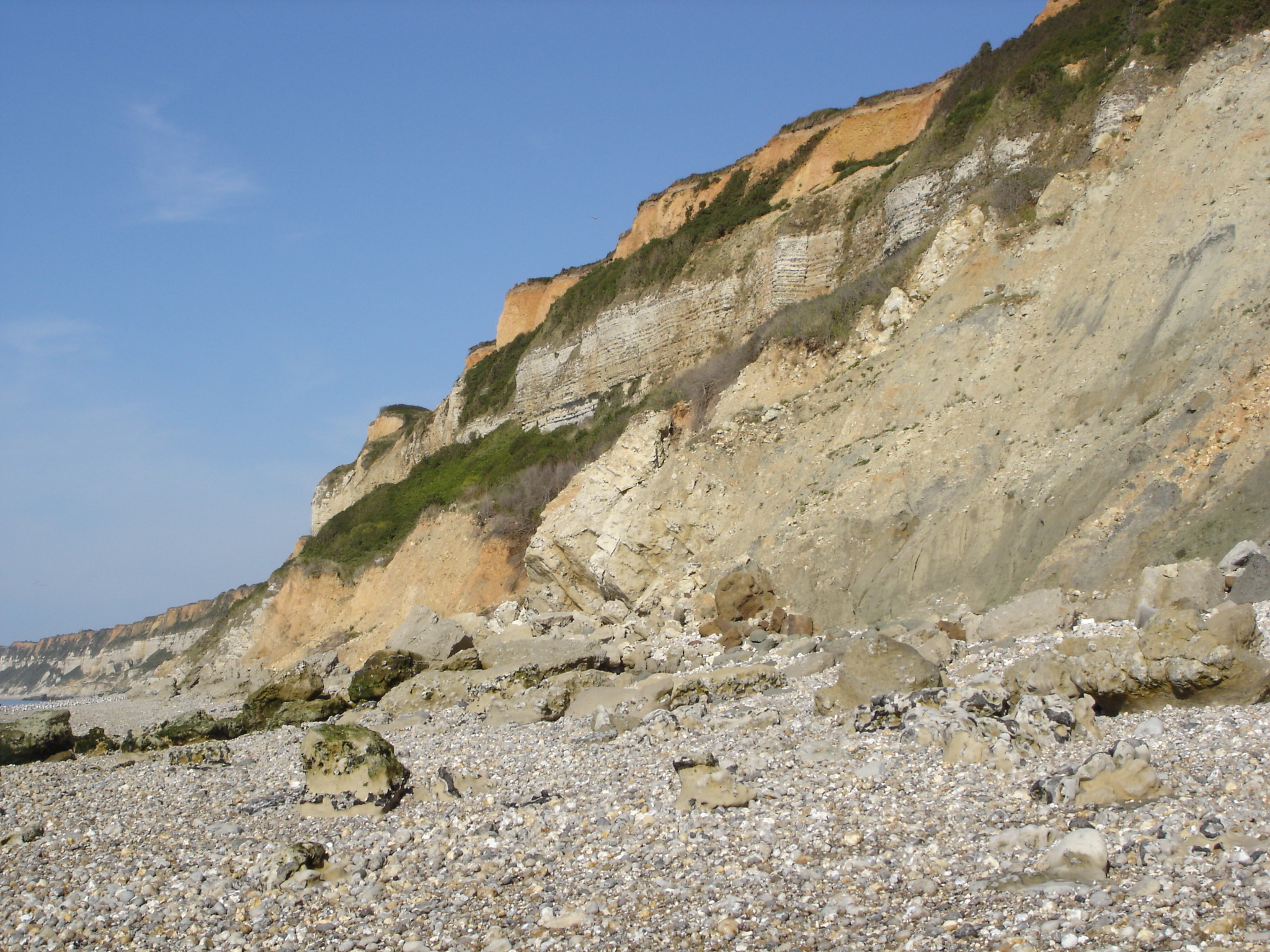
- Cliffs at Cauville-sur-Mer

- Coat of arms
- Location of Cauville-sur-Mer
- Location within France Location within Normandy
- Coordinates: 49°35′46″N 0°07′48″E
- Country: France
- Region: Normandy
- Department: Seine-Maritime
- Arrondissement: Le Havre
- Canton: Octeville-sur-Mer
- Intercommunality: Le Havre Seine Métropole

Government
  - Mayor (2026–32): Agnes Carel
- Area^{1}: 11.19 km^{2} (4.32 sq mi)
- Elevation: 95 m (312 ft)
- Highest elevation: 105 m (344 ft)
- Lowest elevation: 0 m (0 ft)
- Population (2023): 1,678
  - Density: 150.0/km^{2} (388.4/sq mi)
- Time zone: UTC+01:00 (CET)
  - Summer (DST): UTC+02:00 (CEST)
- INSEE/Postal code: 76167 /76930
- ^{1} French Land Register data, which excludes lakes, ponds, glaciers > 1 km^{2} (0.386 sq mi or 247 acres) and river estuaries.

Cauville-sur-Mer (French pronunciation: [kovil syʁ mɛʁ], literally Cauville on Sea) is a commune in the Seine-Maritime department in the Normandy region in northern France.

== Geography ==
A farming village situated in the Pays de Caux, some 10 miles (16 km) northeast of Le Havre, at the junction of the D940 and D311 roads and on the coast of the English Channel. The cliffs here reach up to over 100 metres in height.

=== Heraldry ===
Arms of Cauville-sur-Mer	The arms of Cauville-sur-Mer are blazoned : Gules, in fess 3 stalks of wheat [palewise] slipped and leaved Or, and on a chief azure with a little triangular bit poking down, 2 seagulls volant respectant argent between 3 mullets of 5 Or.

== Population ==
Historical population
Year	Pop.	±% p.a.
1968	494	—
1975	505	+0.32%
1982	1,005	+10.33%
1990	1,165	+1.86%
1999	1,243	+0.72%
2007	1,370	+1.22%
2012	1,458	+1.25%
2017	1,547	+1.19%
2023	1,678	+1.36%
Source: INSEE

== Places of interest ==
- The chateau de Cauville.
- The church of St.Nicholas, dating from the eleventh century.
- The church of St.Pierre at the hamlet of Buglise, dating from the thirteenth century.

== See also ==
- Communes of the Seine-Maritime department
