= Forêt de Bouconne =

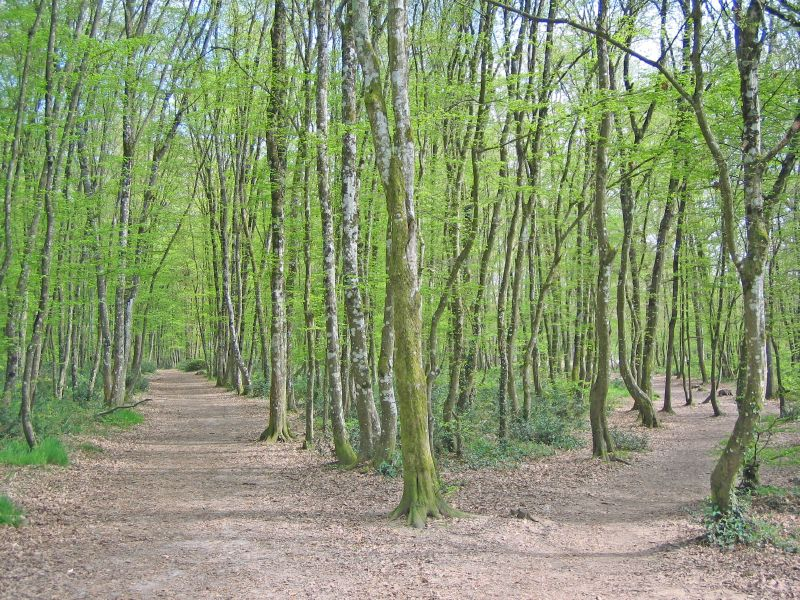
- Paths in the Forêt de Bouconne

- Location within France
- Interactive map of Forêt de Bouconne

Geography
- Location: Gers and Haute-Garonne, Midi-Pyrénées, France
- Coordinates: 43°38′00″N 1°15′00″E
- Area: 27 km^{2} (10 sq mi)

Administration
- Status: Mixed ownership
- Authority: National Forests Office

Ecology
- Dominant tree species: Quercus petraea, pine, sweet chestnut
- Fauna: Wild boar, roe deer

The Forêt de Bouconne is located in southwest France, on the border of the departments of Gers and Haute-Garonne about thirty kilometres west of Toulouse. The forest has an area of 27 km^{2} (10 sq mi) and is managed primarily by the National Forests Office (20 km^{2} (7.7 sq mi)). It also includes privately owned woods and woods belonging to the local communes of L'Isle-Jourdain, Lévignac-sur-Save, Montaigut-sur-Save. It is the only large forest near Toulouse. It hosts a leisure centre and outdoor recreation areas.

The Forêt de Bouconne is traversed by many paths used by walkers, mountain bikers and horse riders.

== History ==
Up until the Middle Ages, the forest extended much further than its present boundaries. To the south it reached the Forêt de Fabas and the Forêt de Mauboussin near Esparron., still-existing fragments of the once much larger forest.

== Fauna and flora ==
The dominant tree species in the forest are sessile oak, pine and sweet chestnut. Among the other trees present are pedunculate oak, cork oak, alder, hornbeam, lime, service tree, ash, Nordmann fir, red oak and Scots pine.

It is home to wild boar and roe deer. Other smaller mammal species are present such as the genet, fox and badger. The short-toed eagle hunts on its periphery.

== See also ==
- List of forests in France
