= Death of Elisa Pilarski =

2019 fatal dog attack in France

- High profile fatal dog attack
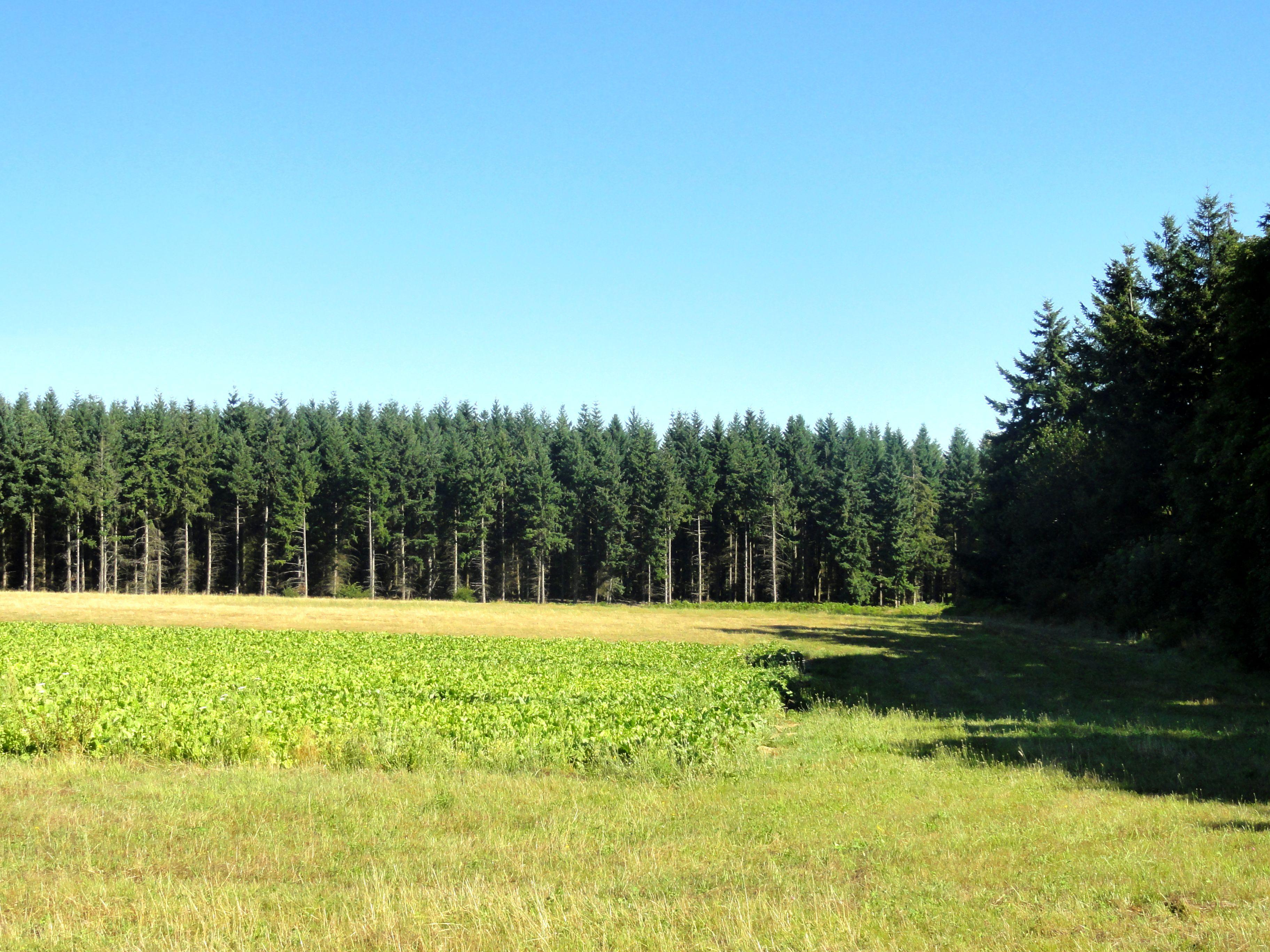
- The incident took place in the Forest of Retz
- Location: Villers-Cotterêts, Aisne, France
- Date: November 16, 2019; 1:30 p.m.
- Attack type: Dog attack
- Victims: Elisa Pilarski (29) and her unborn son Enzo
- Accused: Christophe E. (dog owner)
- Charges: Involuntary manslaughter
- Verdict: Suspect awaiting trial

On November 16, 2019, Elisa Pilarski (born September 7, 1990), who was six months pregnant with her son Enzo, was killed in a dog attack in the Forest of Retz in Aisne, France.

At the time of the incident, Pilarski was walking her partner's dog, Curtis. At the same time, a hunting event with hunting dogs was taking place a few hundred meters away. It took months to determine which dog or dogs were ultimately responsible for the woman's death, and the entire investigation was completed years after her death.

== Circumstances ==
Elisa Pilarski was found lifeless in the Forest of Retz by her partner whom she called 45 minutes earlier during the attack. She had been out walking her partner's dog that day. Her partner stated that she was attacked and killed by hunting dogs. The hunters consistently held that their hunting dogs were controlled and had never attacked a person.

== Investigation ==
DNA tests had to be done on 67 dogs. Pilarski and her partner had 5 dogs and the hunting club had 62 in use during the hunt. The estimated cost for the DNA tests reached €100,000 to €200,000.

On October 31, 2020, the expert opinion of two veterinarians commissioned by the prosecution was published. After examining the jaws of the couple's five dogs and 62 hunting dogs from the hunting club, the two veterinarians found Curtis responsible for the death of Elisa Pilarski:

"le chien Curtis est l'unique auteur des morsures ayant causé le décès […]. Les morsures individualisables sont compatibles avec la mâchoire du seul Curtis, et non des chiens de chasse."

Translation: "The dog Curtis is the sole perpetrator of the bites that led to her death [...]. The identifiable bite marks are consistent with the jaw of Curtis alone, and not with those of the hunting dogs."

The experts also examined Curtis' behavior, which they described as inappropriate and a form of animal cruelty. The expert report also rejected the theory that Curtis had defended Pilarski against the hunting dogs: "There are no marks from the pack's dog paws around the body, no injuries from hunting dogs that would result from a fight, and the minimal injuries to Curtis' head are not the result of dog bites, but were likely caused by him tearing off his muzzle."

The results of the genetic analysis, which were announced on November 3, 2020, confirmed the experts' opinion: On Pilarski's body were only DNA traces of Curtis, not from the hunting dogs. On November 4, 2020, Christophe E. was charged by the public prosecutor's office. His lawyer requested a counter-expert opinion.

The French authorities opened an investigation against X for "involuntary manslaughter by inattention, recklessness, carelessness, negligence or breach of a duty of care (...) as a result of a dog attack". Even after the revelations about the analysis of the dog bites Christophe E. continued to claim at a press conference with his lawyer Alexandre Novion in early November 2020 that it was impossible that his dog was responsible for her death.

== Charges ==
On March 4, 2021, Christophe E. was charged with involuntary manslaughter and placed under judicial supervision. He was banned from contacting the victim's family. On March 29, 2021, he was summoned to Soissons again, this time for a confrontation with the family of Elisa Pilarski. The woman's cell phone was analyzed and contained photos of the dog taken during the walk shortly before her death, as well as a text message from her partner: "Je le fais le piquer" (I'll put him down), suggesting that he was aware of his dog's role in the incident. Christophe E.'s theory that the dog was muzzled and could not have bitten his partner is pushed even further into the background by the fact that the dog was not muzzled in the photos. The fact that a muzzle that did not belong to the dog was found in the woods at the scene of the incident opened the door to the hypothesis that it could have been placed by the dog owner himself, which would mean that he had deliberately altered the scene of the crime.

The investigation was completed in 2023 and the criminal trial for involuntary manslaughter is expected to take place in mid-2024 at the earliest.

Legal significance of the dog breed

Curtis (born 2017) was described by his owner at the beginning of the investigation as a cross between a Patterdale Terrier and a whippet. After an investigation by the police, it turned out that the dog was a purebred American Pit Bull Terrier, a dog banned in France that had been illegally imported from a breeder from the Netherlands and was not registered properly. Three months before the attack, the dog had won a "sporting bite competition" in Belgium, which was only open to dogs of this breed registered in stud books. The likelihood that Curtis, who had been trained to bite in competitions banned in France, had turned on his owner's partner was considered to be a possibility from the outset of the investigation. The American Pit Bull Terrier is not recognized as a dog breed under French law, but is considered a type of dog classified as a category 1 dangerous dog. The acquisition, any transfer (for money or free of charge) and importation into France are prohibited and are punishable by 6 months' imprisonment and a fine of €15,000.

Following the incident, Curtis was taken to a kennel in Haute-Garonne, where he will be euthanized once his role in the pregnant woman's death has been legally established.

== Impact ==
=== Media response ===
The death of Elisa Pilarski caused a great stir in France and led to intense discussions on the question of identifying the dogs and dog owners responsible, as well as on topics such as the need to reform existing laws on dog ownership and the lack of enforcement of existing laws to protect against dogs classified as dangerous. National and international reports on the incident and the subsequent investigations continued for several years.

In 2022, a book was published which, among other things, deals with the investigations to date and the media response to the case.

The actress and animal rights activist Brigitte Bardot wrote an open letter to the French Minister of Justice Éric Dupond-Moretti on November 16, 2020. She criticized the course of the investigation to date and pledged her support to Christophe E. and Curtis the dog.

=== Fundraising ===
In December 2019, an online fundraiser was set up to raise money for the defense of Curtis. Almost €7,000 were raised. The woman who set up the fundraiser later felt misled by the information provided by the dog's owner and called on donors to file a complaint with the provider Leetchi.

=== Regulation of dogs ===
In 2020, the veterinarian and politician Loïc Dombreval called for a reform of the laws on dangerous dogs in place since 1999 on the occasion of Pilarski's death. In particular, the lack of control of dogs that had already become conspicuous or were classified as dangerous was criticized. In April 2022, a motion for a resolution was introduced to tighten the regulations for the acquisition and training of fighting dog breeds and defense dogs.

=== Suspicions against the hunting society ===
Public opinion towards the hunting community was originally negative and skeptical, especially after the first media reports about the death. The hunters consistently held that their hunting dogs were controlled and had never attacked a person. "Vénerie" or "chasse à courre" are the French terms for a type of hunt which includes a pack of dogs.

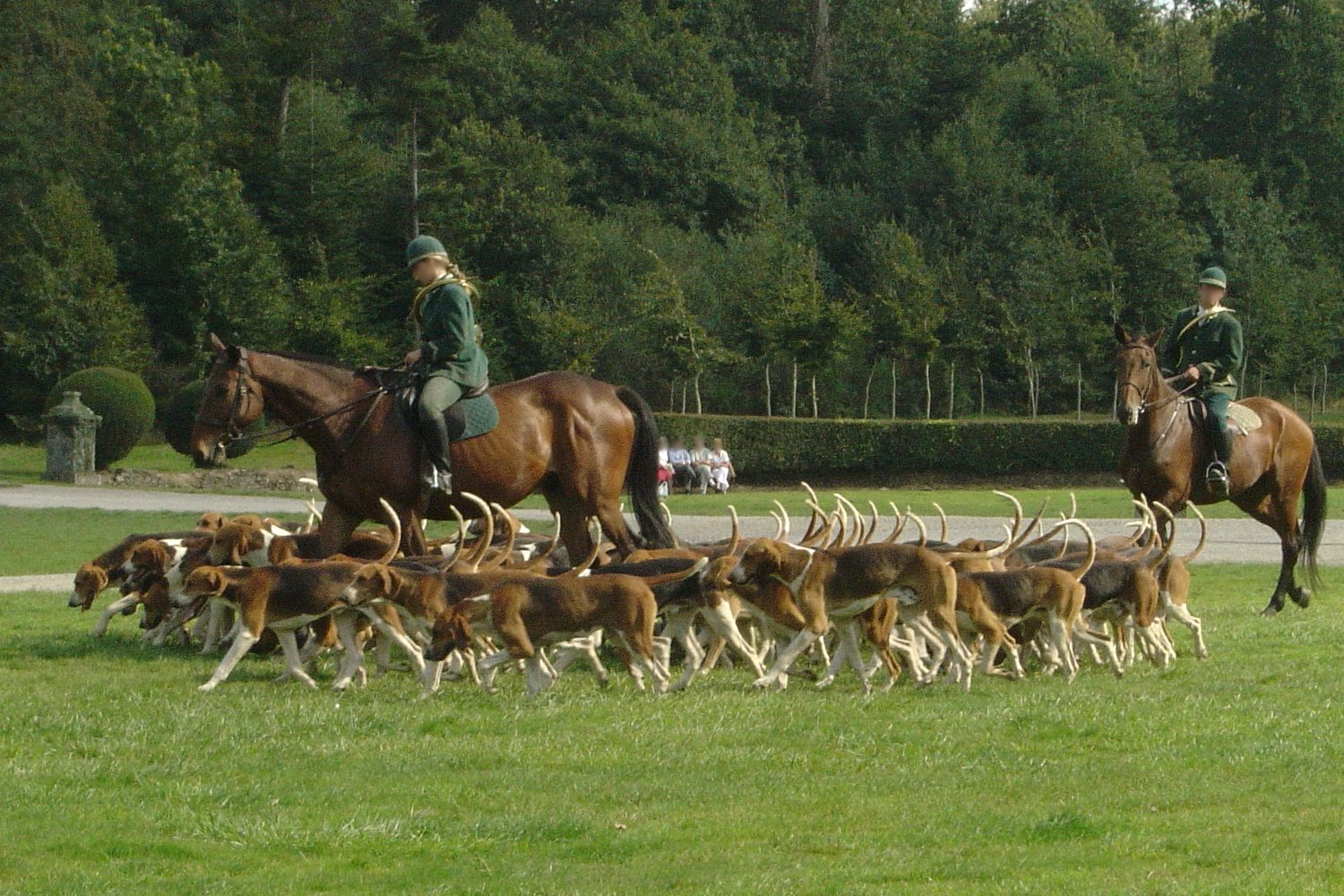
"Vénerie à cheval" is the French name for horseback hunting with dogs

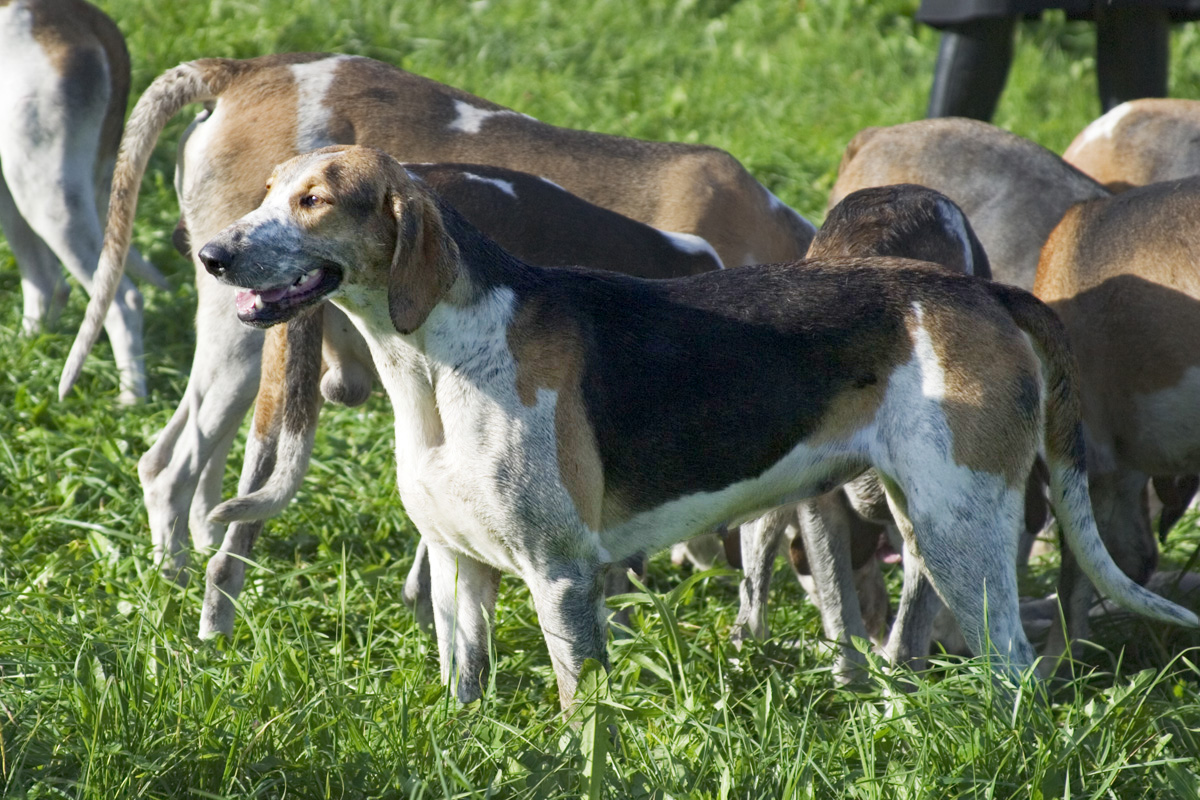
Grand Anglo-Français Tricolore, a typical breed used in pack hunts

== In media ==
Book

- Olivier Darrioumerle, Matthias Tesson: Un chien, l'affaire Curtis-Pilarski. Le Cherche midi, 2022.

Documentary

- Benoît Sarrade, Mélanie Bontems and Alexandre Funel (2021), Curtis, chien tueur? (Curtis, a killer dog?), Ligne rouge, BFMTV.
- Alibi (2023), Elisa Pilarski, cette femme tuée par son chien interdit en France (Elisa Pilarski, the woman killed by her dog banned in France) – (in French) via YouTube.
- Alibi (2024), Interview with Elisa Pilarski's mother (in French) via YouTube.

== See also ==
- Fox hunting
