= Forest of Retz =

Forest in France

Forest of Retz French: Forêt de Retz
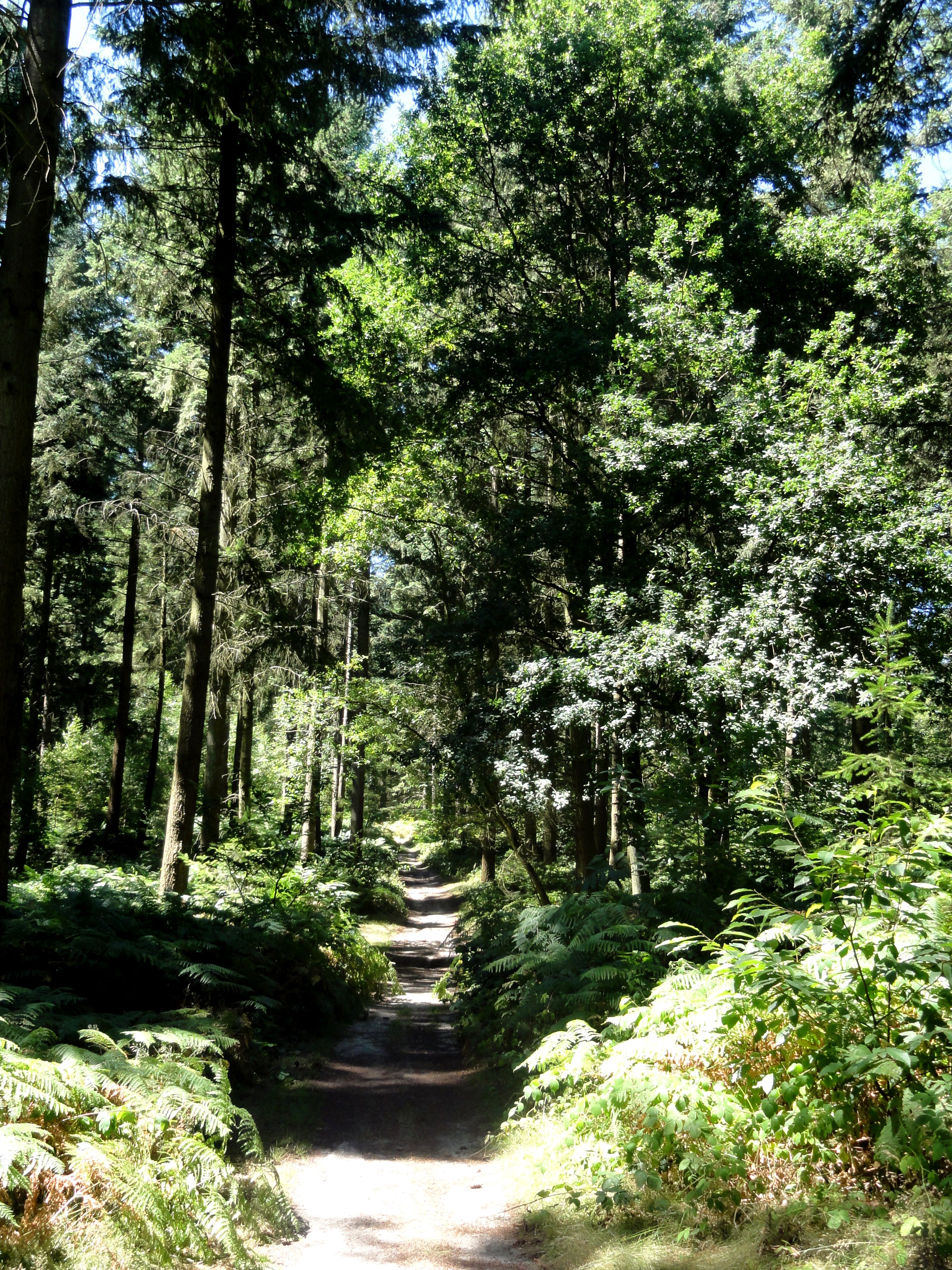
- Walking path in the forest.

- Location within France
- Interactive map of Forest of Retz

Geography
- Location: Aisne, Picardy, France
- Coordinates: 49°15′33″N 3°05′33″E
- Area: 13,339 hectares (32,960 acres)

Administration
- Status: Forêt domaniale
- Authority: National Forests Office (France)

Ecology
- Forest cover: Western European broadleaf forests
- Dominant tree species: Beech (Fagus sylvatica), Red Oak (Quercus robur)

The Forest of Retz (French Forêt de Retz, French pronunciation: [fɔʁɛ də ʁɛts]) is one of the largest forests of France, covering some 13,000 hectares in the Aisne about 80 km northeast of Paris. It is a national forest (forêt domaniale) in the former Picardy region.

One characteristic that sets the Forest of Retz apart from other French national forests, in which the actual forested area has fluctuated, is that the forest here has scarcely changed since it was set apart, en futaie, in 1672.

== History ==
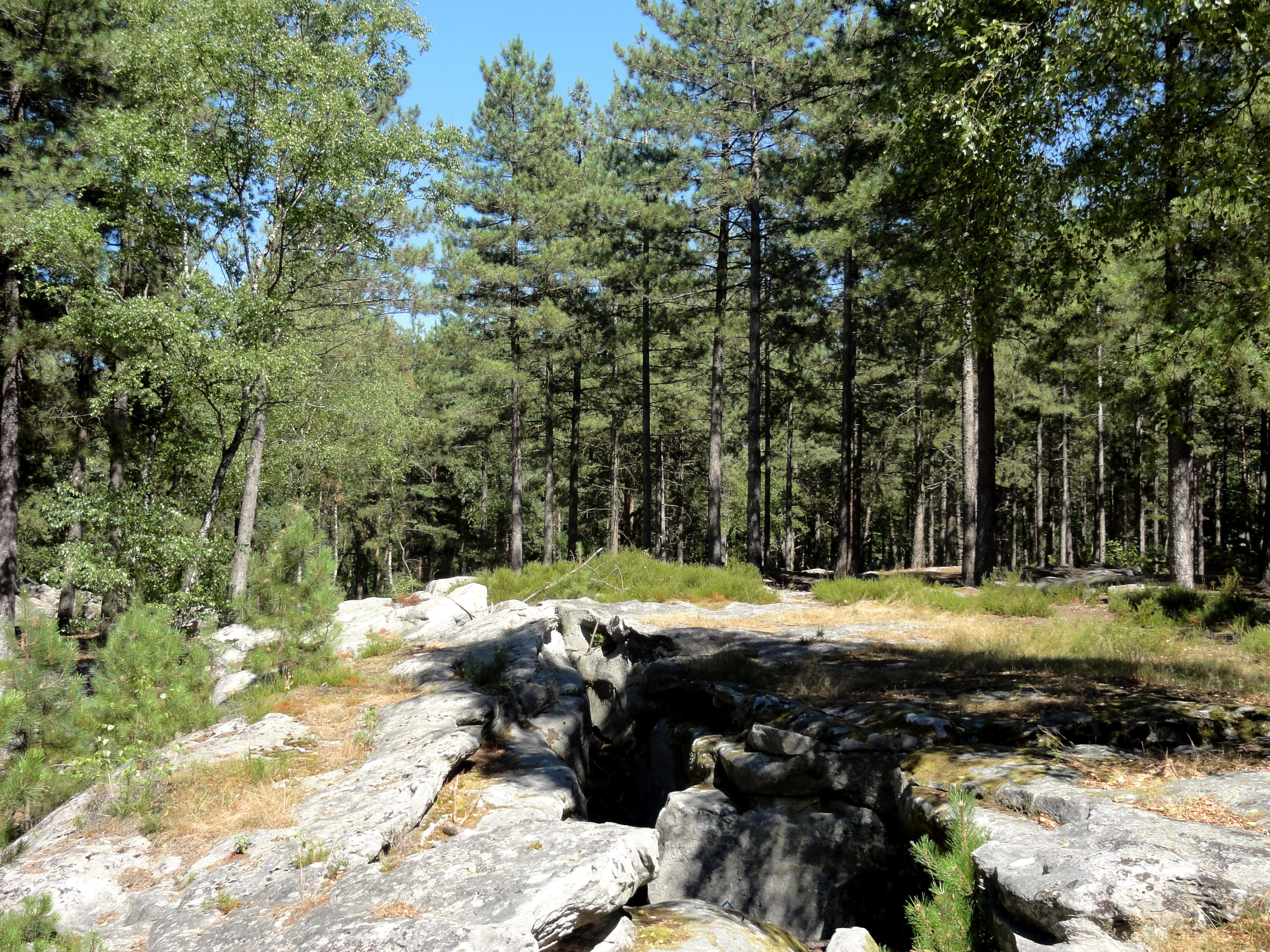
Rock formations and forest.

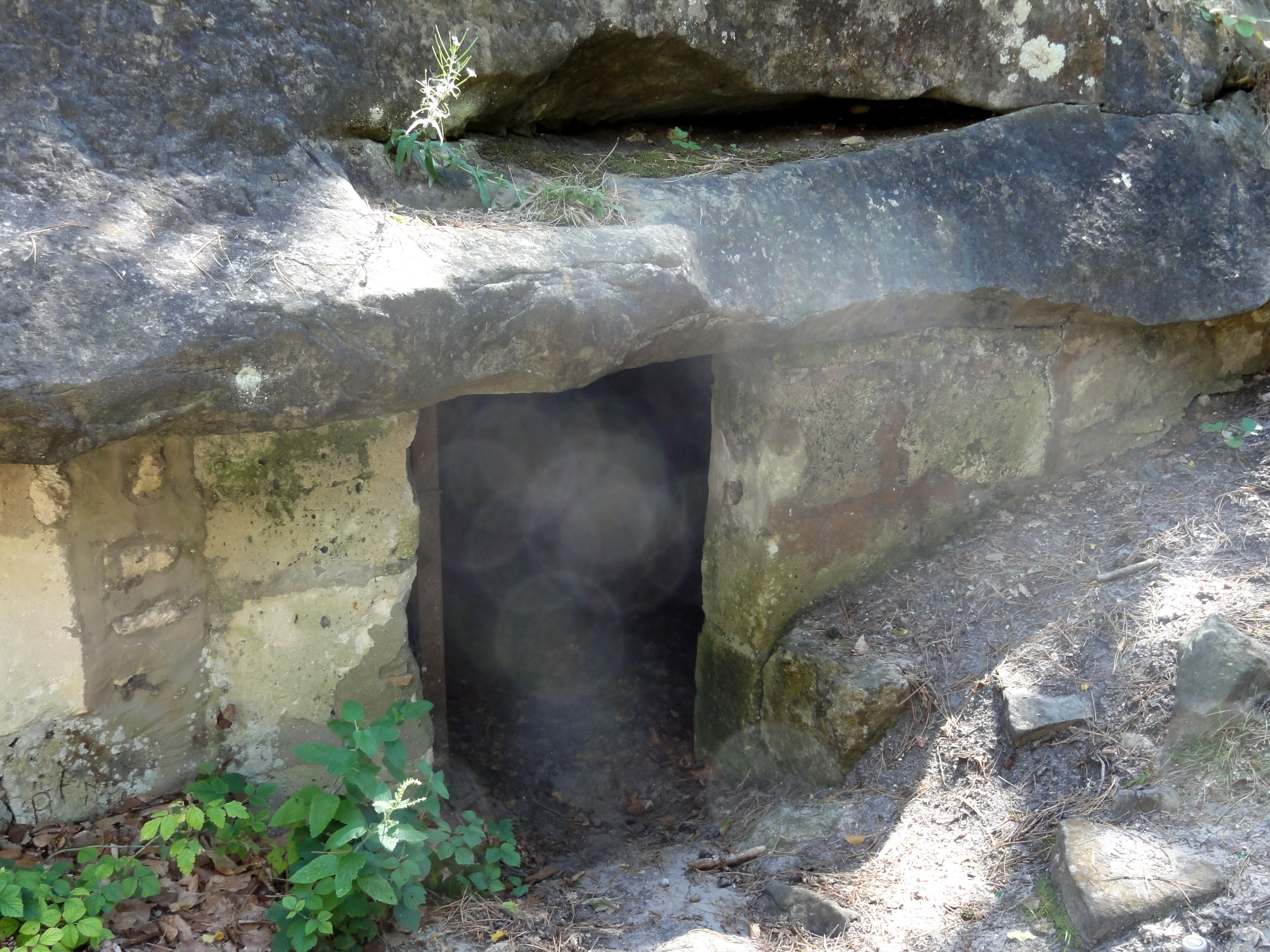
Cave du Diable entrance.

The forest is a relict of the ancient forested cover, though as deforestation progressed, this was not identified as a distinct unity until the 12th century. when it formed part of the vast tracts belonging to the counts of Valois, an immense forested expanse that reached from Retheuil, Chaudin and Buzancy as far as the river Marne, but was reduced and fragmented by increasing agricultural uses during the Middle Ages.

In 1214 Philip Augustus attached the forest to the royal domain and dictated the first ordonnances to guide its maintenance by foresters called sergents du roi, under the governor of royal châteaux of Villers-Cotterêts and of Vivières.

The period of the Hundred Years' War (1337–1453) marked depredations on the woodlands.

In 1346, the Valois King Philip VI of France promulgated the first codified forestry law, the ordonnance de Brunoy, which gave birth to the designated Maître des Eaux et Forêts, a member of the Maison du Roi. The kingdom's first Maître des Eaux et Forêts was installed at the château de Villers-Cotterêts in the Forest of Retz.

In 1499, the Forest of Retz returned to a royal apanage, held by François de Valois, soon to be King François I. The King expressed his appreciation of this forest in numerous works and improvements that included the piercing of rides suited to the hunt now overseen by a Capitaine de chasses, and rebuilding the château de Villers-Cotterêts, for which new sources of water were tapped, which also served the village. A more rational forestry was established and poachers of the king's game were apprehended.

On 8 January 2015, the forest became the center of an extensive manhunt for brothers Saïd and Chérif Kouachi, who were the two main suspects of a terrorist attack against the French satirical magazine Charlie Hebdo. The following day, both suspects were found at a signage production company in Dammartin-en-Goële. After an hours-long standoff, the Kouachi brothers were fatally shot by police.

On November 16, 2019, Elisa Pilarski, who was six months pregnant, was killed in a dog attack in the Forest of Retz.

== See also ==
- Forests of France
- Western European broadleaf forests
