= Endoufielle =

- Commune
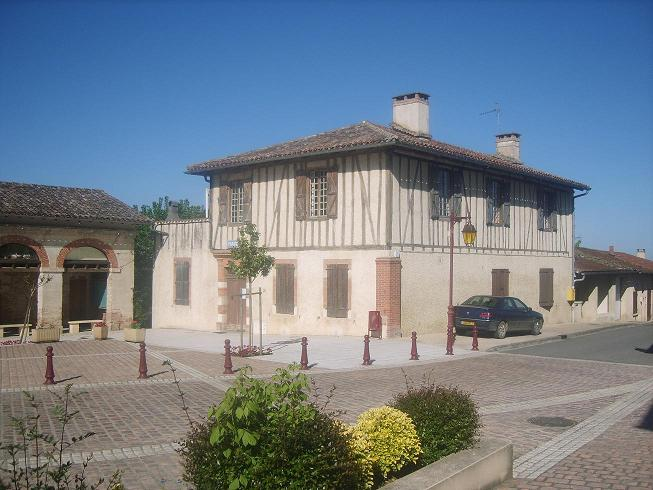
- Town hall

- Coat of arms
- Location of Endoufielle
- Location within France Location within Occitanie
- Coordinates: 43°33′07″N 1°01′27″E
- Country: France
- Region: Occitania
- Department: Gers
- Arrondissement: Auch
- Canton: L'Isle-Jourdain

Government
  - Mayor (2020–2026): Pascale Terrasson
- Area^{1}: 17.1 km^{2} (6.6 sq mi)
- Elevation: 218 m (715 ft)
- Highest elevation: 235 m (771 ft)
- Lowest elevation: 146 m (479 ft)
- Population (2023): 542
  - Density: 31.7/km^{2} (82.1/sq mi)
- Time zone: UTC+01:00 (CET)
  - Summer (DST): UTC+02:00 (CEST)
- INSEE/Postal code: 32121 /32600
- ^{1} French Land Register data, which excludes lakes, ponds, glaciers > 1 km^{2} (0.386 sq mi or 247 acres) and river estuaries.

Endoufielle (French pronunciation: [ɑ̃dufjɛl]; Occitan: Endofièla) is a French commune located in the Gers department of Occitanie in southwestern France. Historically and culturally, the town is in the Savès, a small Gascon province corresponding to the middle course of the Save.

Exposed to an altered oceanic climate, it is drained by the Save, the Boulouze, the Laurio stream, the Peyblanc stream and by various other small streams.

Endoufielle is a rural town with 505 inhabitants in 2020, after having experienced a sharp increase in population since 1975. It is part of the Toulouse area of attraction. Its inhabitants are called Endoufiellois or Endoufielloises.

== Geography ==
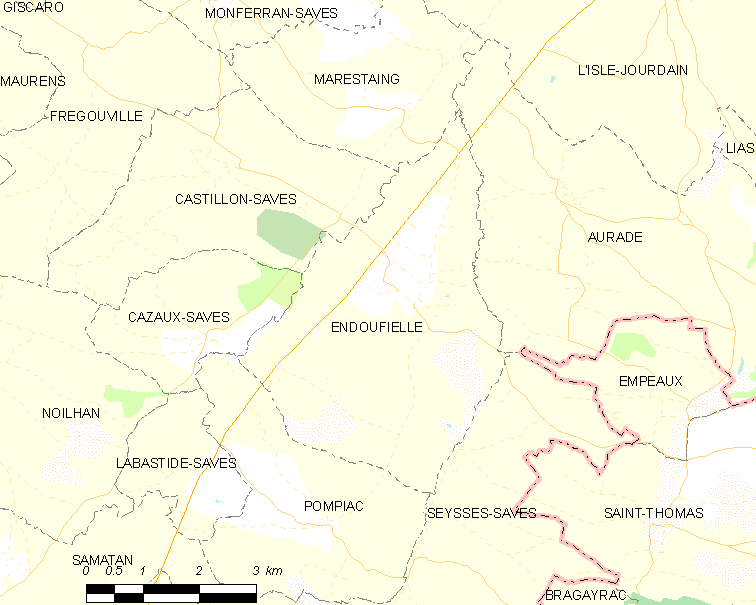
Endoufielle and its surrounding communes

Endoufielle is a commune located in Gascony in the Savès region of Rivière-Verdun, between L'Isle-Jourdain and Samatan.

Endoufielle borders seven other communes. It shares a border with the Haute-Garonne department via a quadripoint. The bordering communes are Auradé, Castillon-Savès, Cazaux-Savès, Marestaing, Pompiac, and Seysses-Savès.

=== Hydrography ===
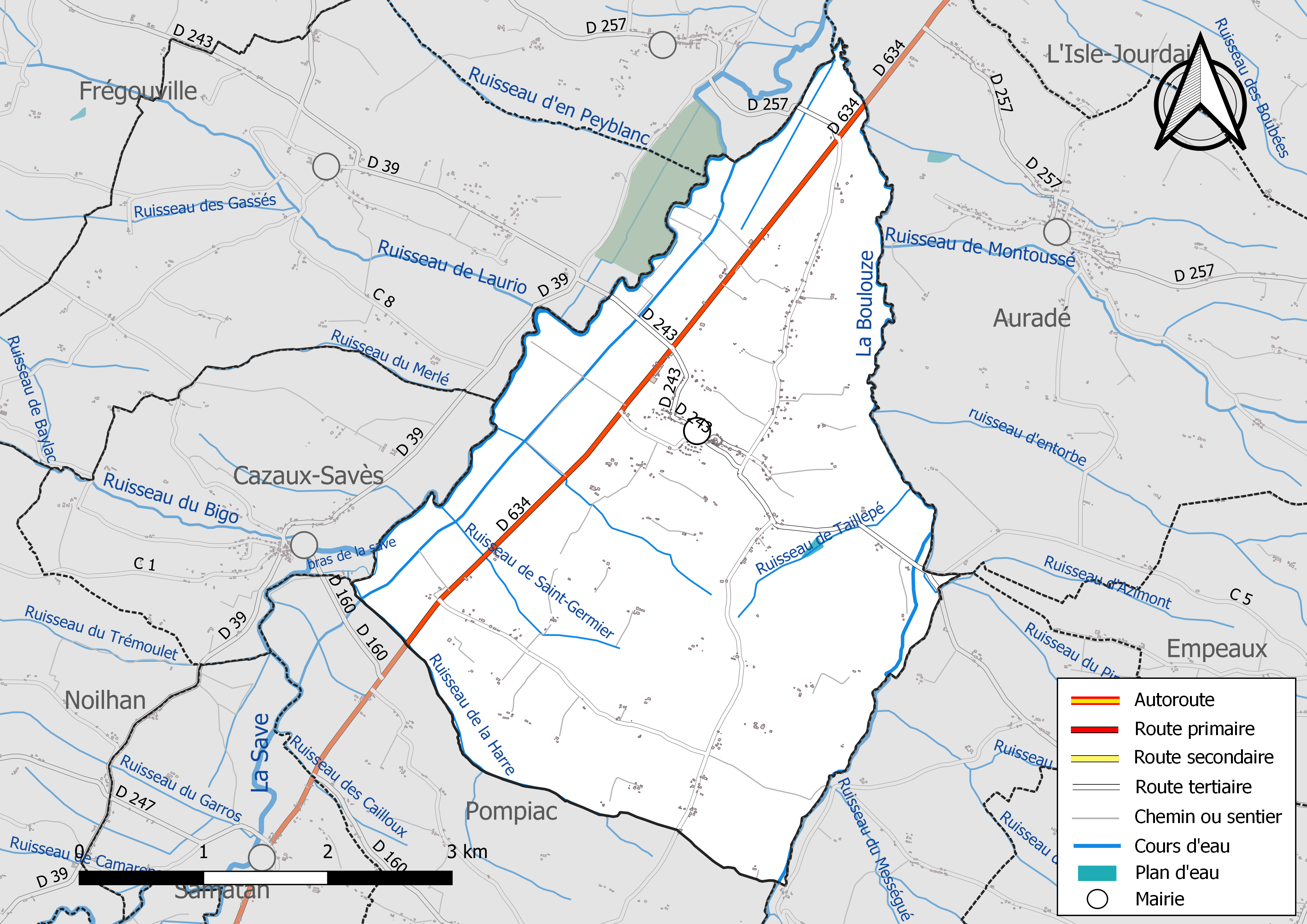
Hydrographic and road network of Endoufielle

The commune is in the Garonne basin, within the Adour-Garonne hydrographic basin. It is drained by the Save, the Boulouze, the Laurio stream, the Peyblanc stream, the Azimont stream, the Harre stream, the Saint-Germier stream, the Taillepé stream, the Merlé stream, the Pinon stream and by various small streams, which constitute a hydrographic network of 25 km in total length.

The Save, with a total length of 143 km, rises in the commune of Lannemezan and flows from southwest to northeast. It crosses the commune and flows into the Garonne at Grenade, after having crossed 46 communes.

The Boulouze, with a total length of 19.7 km, originates in the commune of Lahage and flows northwards. It crosses the commune and flows into the Save at Marestaing, after crossing 10 communes.

== Name ==
Early attestations: Andofielle 1569, Andofiella 1570, Andofiele 1695, Andoufielle 1724, Andouffielle 1727, Andofiel 1783, Endouffielle 1753/1785, Andoufielle 1793, Eudouffielle 1801, Andofiel 1804, Endoufielle 1854, Andoufielle 1857, Endoufielle 1825/1866.

The name of this place has been known since the middle of the 11th century through that of Aton, lord of Endoufielle, but evidence of the original form is lacking.

This is undoubtedly a Merovingian place name in -villa which gave -viala in Languedocian, vièla in Gascon, subsequently Gallicized into -ville, -vielle or -fielle in the same region.

The first element is undoubtedly the personal name Andulfus, a Latinized form of a Gothic anthroponym cited by Marie-Thérèse Morlet; -vielle would have changed to -fielle, through assimilation of the [v] of -villa to the [f] of the anthroponym. As for the original initial An-, it appears to have been modified later to En-, perhaps based on the numerous place names beginning with en + personal names attested in the Gers region.

The personal name Andulfus may be perpetuated in the surname Andou attested in the southwest in ancient times, and certainly in the Italian surname Andolfi.

The hypothesis of a Gothic origin of the first element is reinforced by the fact that -ville is most often preceded by a Germanic personal name, as well as by the existence, in the immediate vicinity, of the village of Goudourville which, according to Albert Dauzat and Charles Rostaing, goes back to Gothorum villa "village of the Goths".

The same variant in -fielle is also found in Renoufielle (former parish, now a place name in L'Isle-Jourdain: Renoufielle 1595 and 1763, Renouffiel 1763/1788, Renouffielle 1753/1785) and in Ségoufielle (Seguenvilla 1196).

== History ==
Several lords of Endoufielle can be identified:

- Aton d'Andoufielle (11th century), son of Raymond Aton, lord of l'Hille (later Isle-Jourdain), and brother of Saint Bertrand (born around 1047), archbishop of Auch. Aton took his name from the land of his appanage. He married the daughter of the baron of Montaut, with whom he had Guillaume, another archbishop of Auch.
- Étienne du Gout, squire, lord of Andoufielle and Saint-Germier, stable squire to the Count of Armagnac, who married Claire de Galard, lady of Saint-Germier. He is mentioned in two documents dated February 10, 1465 and February 28, 1467.
- Alain Frédéric d'Ornezan, lord of Andofielle, died in 1569.
- Jean de Lastours, lord of Andofiella, in charge in 1570 of a company of soldiers garrisoned in Lisle-sur-Tarn.
- Sir François de Bonfontan, Baron of Andoufielle, cited in a ruling of the Parlement of Toulouse issued against him on September 6, 1724.
- Philippe de Bonfontan, knight, lord, baron of Endoufielle, count of Puy, lord of Lissac, Labatut and other places, capitoul-gentleman, cited in 1786 and 1787 as a member of the new administration determined by decree of the Council and the ordinance of the King of June 26, 1778.

=== Heraldry ===
Endoufielle	Tierced in reversed pairle: first gules with a cross clechée, voided, pommée of twelve pieces or, second argent with a lion gules, third azure with a sheaf of wheat or tied gules.

== Population ==
Historical population
Year	Pop.	±% p.a.
1968	348	—
1975	310	−1.64%
1982	312	+0.09%
1990	397	+3.06%
1999	446	+1.30%
2007	541	+2.44%
2012	560	+0.69%
2017	527	−1.21%
2023	542	+0.47%
Source: INSEE

== See also ==
- Communes of the Gers department
