= Savès =

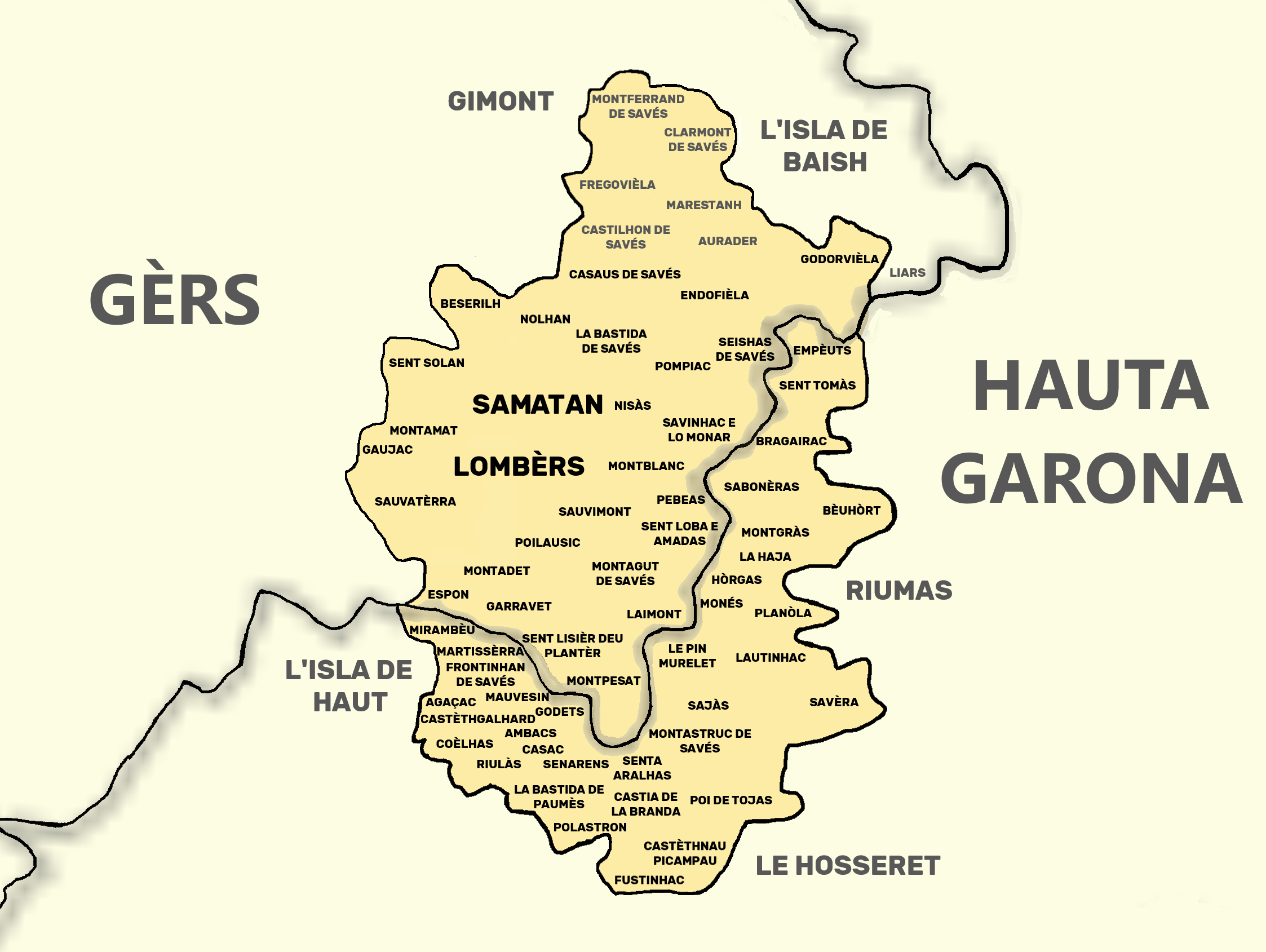
Map of Savès.

The Savès region is a small Occitan area located in eastern Gascony (straddling the Gers and Haute-Garonne departments), yet barely forty kilometers west of Toulouse (and thus included, in a broad sense, within the "Toulouse Gascony" region).

== Geography ==
The Savés region consists of a network of small valleys formed by various streams and their tributaries (including the Aussoue, Espienne, Ladère, Gradoue, Lieuze, Esquinson, Comps, En Cramaillan stream, Ouarets and Monès streams, Laymont and Mourères streams, La Barthe stream, Cabanne and Labéjan streams), all of which converge on the main valley of the Save River near Samatan.The point where the Aussoue, the largest stream, joins the Save forms the boundary between the municipalities of Samatan and Labastide-Savès.

For its part, the Boulouze flows into the Save 9 kilometers downstream, in the Cogotois area. The confluence of the Boulouze and the Save marks the boundary between three communes in the Lower Savès: Endoufielle, Auradé and Marestaing.

The current Savès Community of Municipalities comprises 32 municipalities, including most of those in the Gers portion of the Upper Savès, but excludes villages in the Lower Savès such as Goudourvielle (currently part of the municipality of Lias) and Endoufielle, as well as Auradé, Marestaing, Monferran-Savès, Frégouville, Clermont-Savès and Castillon-Savès (the Cogotois area).

== History ==
In ancient times, the Savès was clearly identified as being inhabited by a tribe of Aquitanians: the Romans referred to the "Pagus Savencii" (Land of the Savesians) to describe this region.

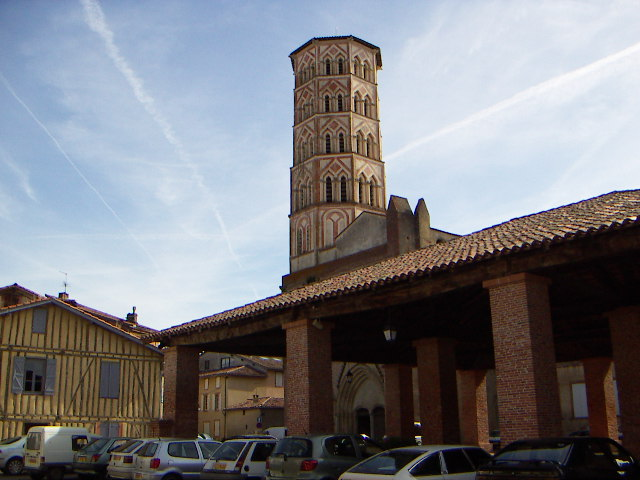
Lombez Cathedral.

In the Middle Ages, Upper Savès was a region centred on the towns of Lombez and Samatan: these two neighbouring towns were naturally situated in the Save Valley, at the confluence of the valleys criss-crossing this rugged, hilly terrain. Lombez was the religious centre: it was even the seat of a bishopric. Samatan was the political and economic centre: It was a castellany, attached in 1114 (or 1120?) to the County of Comminges following the marriage of Diaz of Muret (daughter of Godefroy Lord of Muret, Savès and Samatan) to Count Bernard I of Comminges. A thriving market developed there which still exists today (on Mondays).

Downstream from Labastide-Savès, the lower Savès was not incorporated into the Savès region until relatively late: for example, the outlying communes of Auradé, Clermont-Savès, Marestaing, Monferran-Savès, Frégouville and Castillon-Savès were likely originally part of a separate, distinct region known as the Cogotois.

Since the Middle Ages, the Savès has been a Gascon region: populated by a strong original Basque-speaking population and colonised by the Romans, the Occitan spoken and written there is directly derived from the Latin of the colonists; however, this Occitan of Savès is a hybrid dialect, altered by a strong influence from Basque (Gascon).

At the time of the Albigensian Crusade, just after the Battle of Muret (1213), the Savès was ravaged by a raid carried out by the French under the command of Simon de Montfort. However, whilst the County of Toulouse was eventually annexed by the Kingdom of France following this war, the Comminges remained outside French influence and retained a degree of independence.

But at the end of the Hundred Years' War, the French monarchy extended its control as far as the Pyrenees: in 1454, Comminges (and therefore Savès) was annexed to the French crown by King Charles VII of France.

In 1539, the Ordinance of Villers-Cotterêts imposed the use of the French language in the administration. However, as this ordinance applied only to the educated classes and officials of the royal administration, the Gascon spoken in Savès remained the language of everyday use amongst the population until the early 20th century. It was not until the 1930s that Southern French began to supplant Occitan in everyday life amongst the inhabitants of Savès. Gascon from the Savès is still spoken at the start of the 21st century, but given the mixing of the population, the rural exodus of many native Savès residents to the major cities and the arrival of new French-speaking inhabitants, it is now a residual language, marginalised by standard French.

== See also ==
- Gascony
- Comminges
- Samatan
- Lombez
- Roman Catholic Diocese of Lombez
