= Marestaing =

- Commune
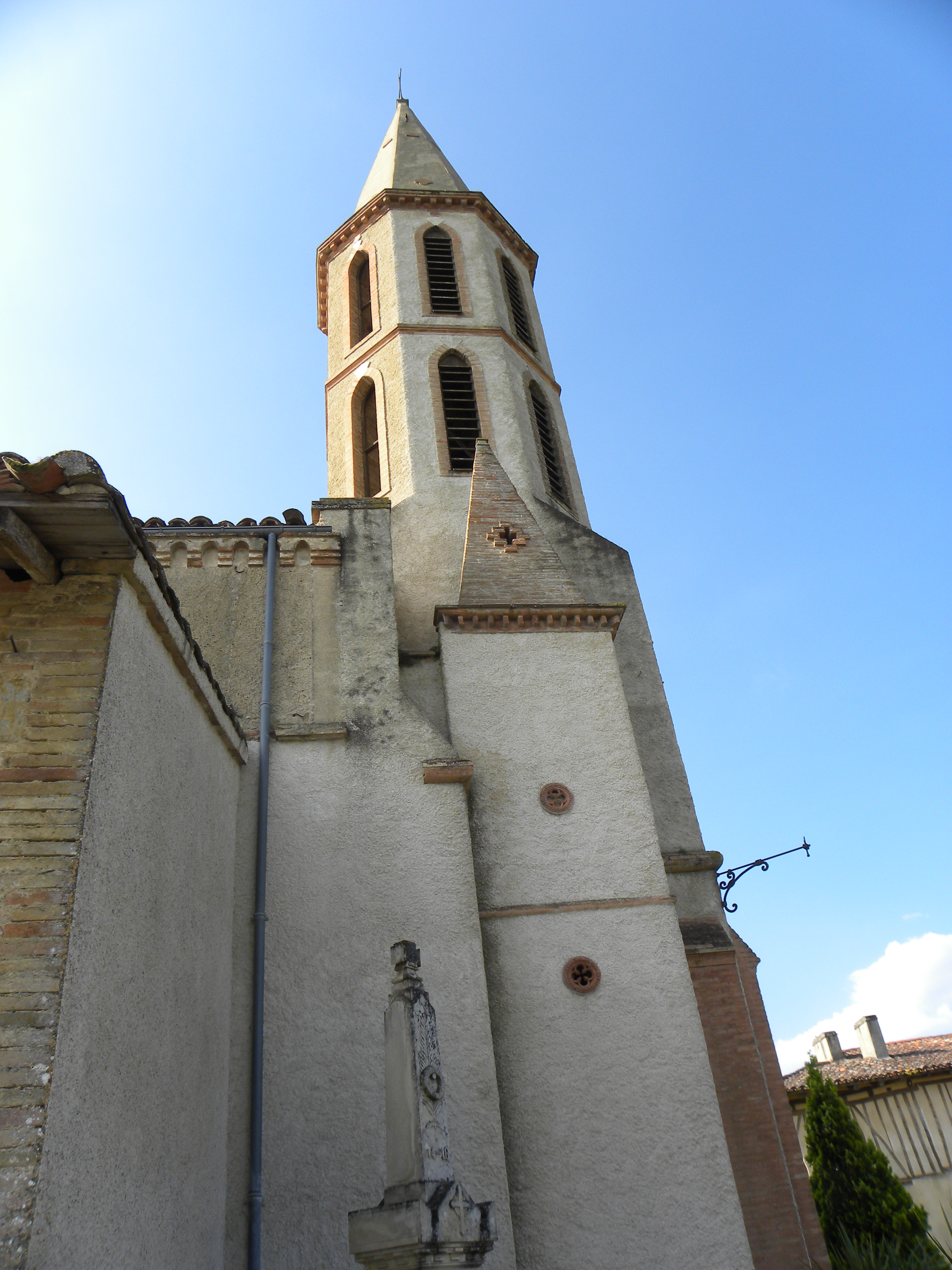
- The church in Marestaing

- Coat of arms
- Location of Marestaing
- Location within France Location within Occitanie
- Coordinates: 43°34′49″N 1°01′13″E
- Country: France
- Region: Occitania
- Department: Gers
- Arrondissement: Auch
- Canton: L'Isle-Jourdain

Government
  - Mayor (2020–2026): Claudine Danezan
- Area^{1}: 8.46 km^{2} (3.27 sq mi)
- Elevation: 180 m (590 ft)
- Highest elevation: 223 m (732 ft)
- Lowest elevation: 144 m (472 ft)
- Population (2023): 331
  - Density: 39.1/km^{2} (101/sq mi)
- Time zone: UTC+01:00 (CET)
  - Summer (DST): UTC+02:00 (CEST)
- INSEE/Postal code: 32234 /32490
- ^{1} French Land Register data, which excludes lakes, ponds, glaciers > 1 km^{2} (0.386 sq mi or 247 acres) and river estuaries.

Marestaing (French pronunciation: [maʁɛstɛ̃]; Occitan: Marestanh) is a commune in the Gers department in southwestern France.

== Geography ==
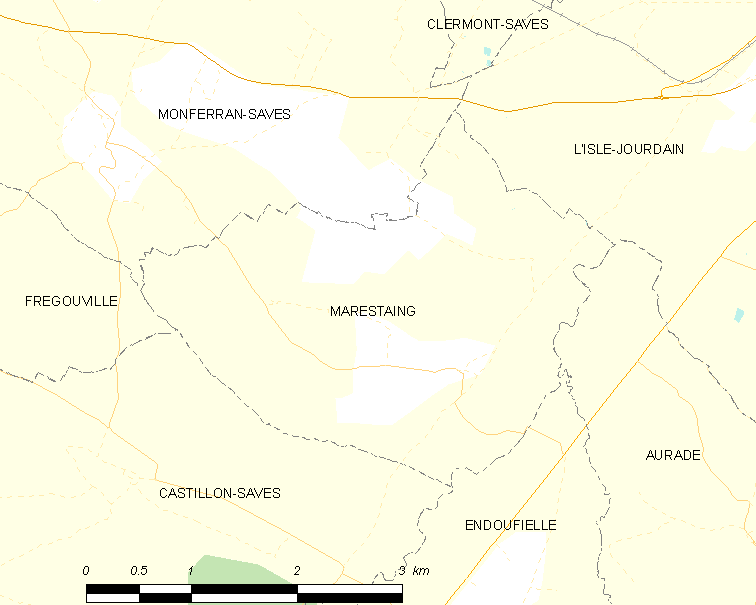
Marestaing and its surrounding communes

Marestaing is surrounded by other divisions such as Monferran-Savès, L'Isle-Jourdain, Auradé, Endoufielle, Castillon-Savés, and Frégouville.

== History ==
During the World War II, Marestaing was captured by Nazi Germany around 1941 or 1942, resulting of extensively heavy damage until the Allied Powers arrived cir. 1944 - 1945.

== Population ==
Historical population
Year	Pop.	±% p.a.
1968	137	—
1975	125	−1.30%
1982	141	+1.74%
1990	155	+1.19%
1999	170	+1.03%
2007	200	+2.05%
2012	264	+5.71%
2017	319	+3.86%
2023	331	+0.62%
Source: INSEE

== See also ==
- Communes of the Gers department
