= John of Basle =

John of Basel or John of Basle may refer to:

- Johann Hiltalinger (1315?–1392), Swiss Augustinian theologian and Bishop of Lombez
- John of Rheinfelden (c. 1340 - unknown), Dominican friar and writer who published the oldest known description in Europe of playing cards.
