= Pierre Nogaret de La Valette =

French peer and soldier (1497–1553)

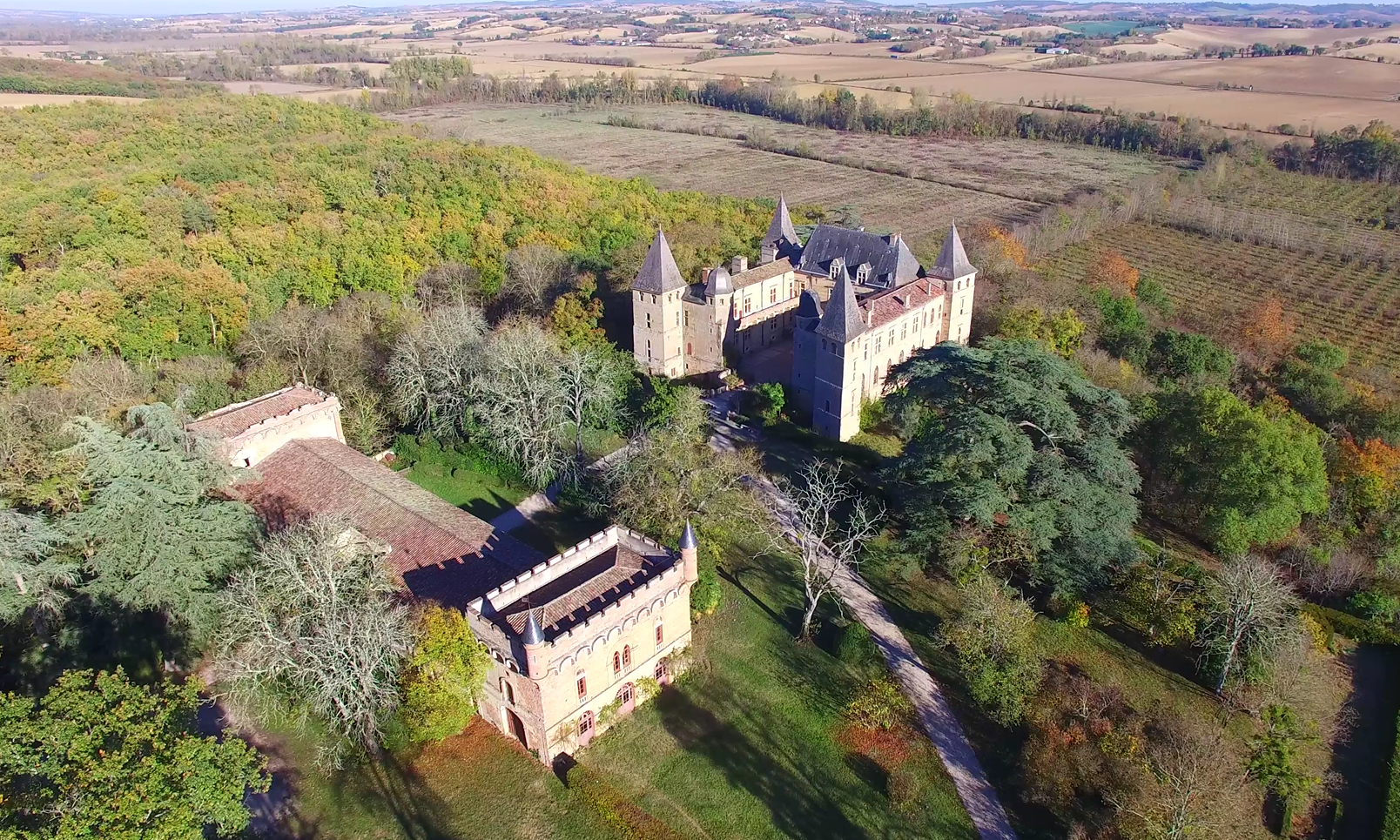
Caumont Castle in Cazaux-Savès

Pierre Nogaret de La Valette (1497–1553), Seigneur de Valette, was born in Toulouse, the son of Bernard Nogaret de La Valette and his wife Anne Bretolene Rouergue (1480–1530).

Pierre built the present castle Caumont on his return from the Italian wars in which he fought for Francis I.

Pierre was a military man who fought in the Italian Wars. With his wife, Marguerite de L'Isle de St. Aignan (1499–1535), he had four children: Bernard de La Valette, Seigneur de Coppadel (1521-?), Gabrielle (1523–1548), Pierre (1525–1545), and Jean de Nogaret de La Valette (1527–1575).
