= Canton of L'Isle-Jourdain =

Administrative division of Gers department, France

Coordinates: 43.61°N 1.08°E

The canton of L'Isle-Jourdain is an administrative division of the Gers department, southwestern France. Its borders were modified at the French canton reorganisation which came into effect in March 2015. Its seat is in L'Isle-Jourdain.

It consists of the following communes:

1. Auradé
2. Clermont-Savès
3. Endoufielle
4. Frégouville
5. L'Isle-Jourdain
6. Lias
7. Marestaing
8. Monferran-Savès
9. Pujaudran
10. Ségoufielle
