= Roman Catholic Diocese of Lombez =

Coordinates: 43.4746°N 0.9103°E

The former Roman Catholic Diocese of Lombez (or Lombès) existed, with see at Lombez in the present department of Gers in Gascony, from 1317 to the Napoleonic reshuffle after the French Revolution.

== History ==
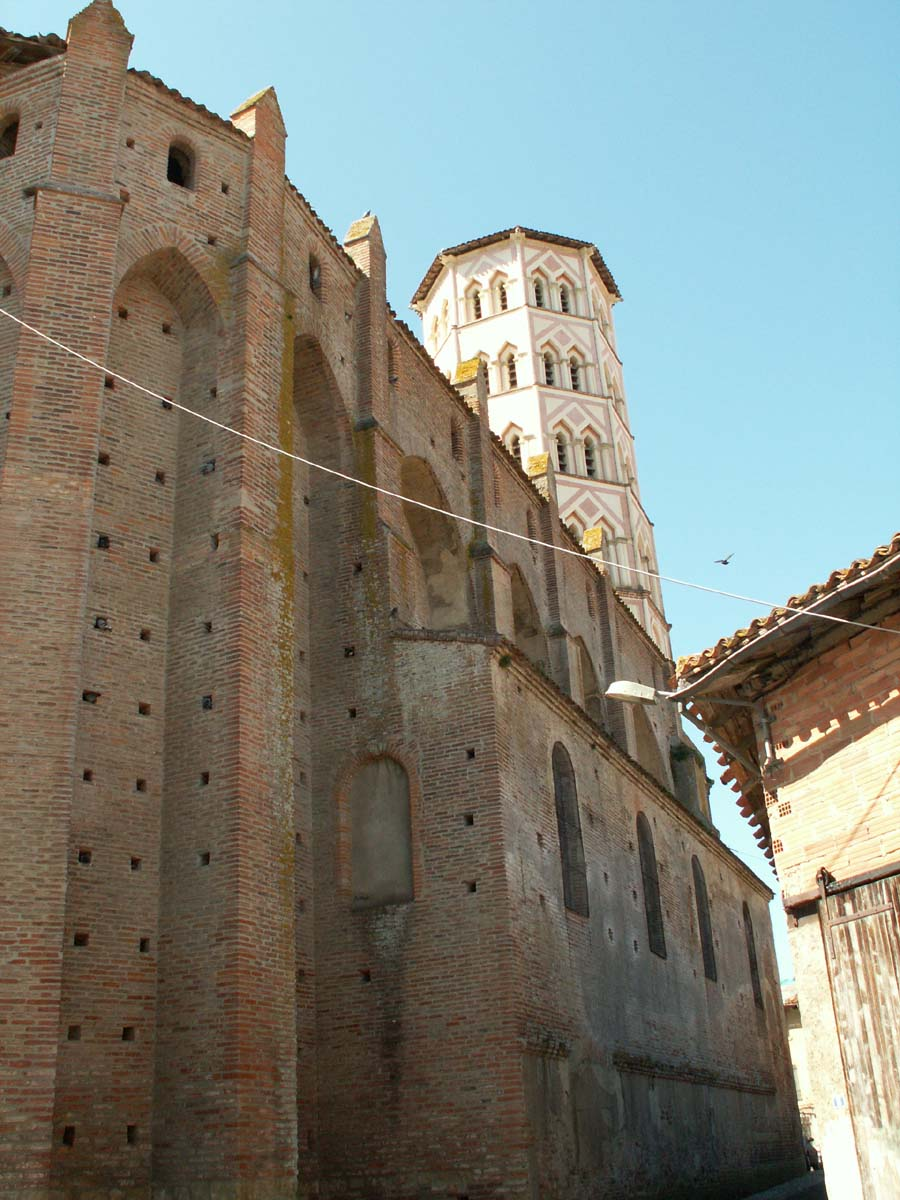
Cathedral Sainte Marie at Lombez.

- Tradition holds the region around Ancient Lumbarium was evangelized by Saint Maiano in the sixth-seventh centuries; the chapel built on his tomb would have been the start of modern Lombez.
- In the late eight century a Benedictine abbey was established, dedicated to Notre-Dame, which in 1125 was ceded to the Canons Regular of Saint Augustine.
- The bishopric was established on 1317.08.16 as Diocese of Lombez / Lomberien(sis) (Latin adjective), receiving its territory from its Metropolitan, the Archdiocese of Toulouse; the last abbot was appointed its first bishop. It bordered the Diocese of Montauban (north), Archdiocese of Toulouse (east), Diocese of Rieux and Diocese of Comminges (both south), Archdiocese of Auch and Diocese of Lectoure (both west).
- Its see, Lombez Cathedral, was built from the fourteenth century, when the former abbey church of Saint Mary was remodeled, and consecrated in 1770. In 1771 it comprised 99 parishes.
- In 1790 its cathedral was decommissioned, the see was abolished (against canon law) by the revolutionary republican authorities in favor of a short-lived Constitutional bishopric for the department : Diocese of Gers with seat at the capital Auch.
- It was formally restored but now canonically suppressed on 29 November 1801 after the Napoleonic Concordat of 1801, by Pope Pius VII's papal bulla Qui Christi Domini, its territory being divided between the diocese of Bayonne and the Metropolitan Archdiocese of Toulouse.
- On 29 June 1908, its now-honorary title was united, simultaneously with the titles of the former Diocese of Condom and Diocese of Lectoure, with the Metropolitan Archdiocese of Auch

When the Archdiocese of Auch was restored in 1822, it acquired most of Lombez's former territory.

== Episcopal Ordinaries ==
Suffragan Bishops of Lombez

- Arnaud-Roger de Comminges, Augustinians (O.E.S.A.) (1317-1328), previously last Abbot of Lombez (until 1317) and Bishop of the then Diocese of Toulouse (France) (1297 – 1298)
- Jacques Colonna (1328-1341), in 1329 received author Francesco Petrarca and made him canon in the cathedral chapter.
- Antoine (1341-1348)
- Bertrand de Coznac, Augustinian Canons Regular (C.R.S.A.) (1348.09.17 – 1352.10.17), next Bishop of Saint-Bertrand-de-Comminges (France) (1352.10.17 – retired 1371.05.30), created Cardinal-Priest of S. Marco (1372.03 – death 1374.06.17)
- Roger (1353-1360)
- Guillaume (1360– 1362)
- Jean Belveti de Saie (John) (1362 – 1363.01.18), next Bishop of Dax (France) (1363.01.18 – 1375.06.09), Bishop of Agen (France) (1375.06.09 – 1381.12.28), Bishop of Albi (France) (1382.07.24 – death 1383)
- Guillaume (William) de Durfort-Duras (1363 – death 1375?79)
- Arnaud (1379 - death 1382?83)
- Pierre de Paris (1382 – death 1389)
- Jean Hiltalinger (1389 - death 1392)
- Pierre (Paris (10 October 1392 – death 1413)
- Raymond de Bretennes = Raimond de Castalnau-Bretonoux (1413.06.28 – death 1417), previously Bishop of Périgueux (France) (1404.01.24 – 1413.06.28)
- Arnaud de Mirepoix (17 February 1417 – 1425)
  - uncanonical? Apostolic Administrator Pierre de Foix, Friars Minor (O.F.M.) (1425 – 1426?c.1460, deposed by Rome 25 March 1425), while Pseudocardinal; uncanonical Bishop of Diocese of Lescar (France) (1409.10.23 – 1422▼), uncanonical Chamberlain of the Holy Roman Church of Reverend Apostolic Camera (1414.10.30 – 1464.12.13▼), Pseudocardinal-Priest of S. Stefano al Monte Celio (1417 – 1431.03.14▼), (un?)canonical Apostolic Administrator of Diocese of Saint-Bertrand-de-Comminges (France) (1422.08.07 – 1437); later promoted Pseudocardinal-Bishop of Suburbicarian Diocese of Albano (1431.03.14 – 1464.12.13▼), (un?)canonical Apostolic Administrator of Diocese of Mirepoix (France) (1432.11.09 – 1433.07), (un?)canonical Apostolic Administrator of Diocese of Lescar (France) (1433.01.24 – 1460), (un?)canonical Apostolic Administrator of Archdiocese of Arles (France) (1450.09.25 – 1463.03.24), (un?)canonical Apostolic Administrator of Diocese of Dax (France) (1451.07.05 – 1459.05.30), (un?)canonical Apostolic Administrator of Diocese of Tarbes (France) (1453.02.11 – 1464.12.13)
- Gérard Garsias de Charne = Garsie de Charne d'Aure (25 May 1425?1430 - 1450? )
- Gerard d’Aure (c.1456 - 1460?63)
- Sanche Garcias = Sanche Garsie d'Aure (22 April 1463 - death 1472)
- Jean de Villiers de La Groslaye = Jean Bilhères de Lagraulas), Benedictine Congregation of Cluny (O.S.B. Clun.) (5 July 1473 – resigned 4 August 1499), died 6 August 1499; also created Cardinal-Priest of S. Sabina (1493.09.23 – death 1499.08.06), Bishop of Condom (France) (1496.10.26 – 1499.08.06), Bishop of Viviers (France) (1498.02.14 – 1499.08.06)
- Denis de Villiers de la Groslaye (4 August 1499 – death 1510)
- Savari d'Ornézan (12 December 1511 - resigned 3 April 1528)
- Bernard d'Ornézan (23 April 1528 - death 1552)
- Antoine Olivier (1552.09.12 – resigned 1566), previously Bishop of Digne (France) (1546.02.26 – 1552.09.12)
- Pierre de Lancrau (20 March 1566 - death 18 October 1598)
- Jean Daffis (1597.11.10 – 1614.02.01), succeeded as former Titular Bishop of Auzia (1594.01.19 – 1597.11.10) and Coadjutor Bishop of Lombez (1594.01.19 – 1597.11.10); founded Lombez seminary in 1597
- Bernard Daffis (17 March 1614 - death January 1628)
- Jean Daffis (21 August 1628 - death November 1655)
- long vacancy
- Bishop-elect Nicolas Le Maistre (March 1661 - death 14 October 1661)
- Jean-Jacques Séguier de La Verrière (27 February 1662 - 24 August 1671), next Bishop of Nîmes (1671 - ?)
- Côme Roger, Cistercian Order (O.Cist.) (14 December 1671 - death 20 December 1710)
- Antoine Fagon (1712.03.16 – 1720.03.20), next Bishop of Vannes (Brittany, France) ([1719.08.29] 1720.03.20 – death 1742.02.16)
- Charles-Guillaume de Maupeou (16 June 1721 - death 17 February 1751), started the diocesan periodical

BIOS TO ELABORATE

- Jacques Richier de Cerizy (1751-1771, (re?)consecrated the cathedral
- François de Pons de Salignac de La Mothe-Fénelon (1771-1787
- Alexandre-Henri de Chauvigny de Blot (1787-1790, last bishop. The diocese was suppressed (1790).

== See also ==
- Catholic Church in France
- List of Catholic dioceses in France
- Savès

== Sources and external links ==
- GCatholic.org - former bishopric
- GCatholic.org - former cathedral of St. Mary Major

Bibliography

- Denis de Sainte-Marthe, Gallia christiana, vol. XIII, Paris 1785, coll. 319-330
- A. Clergeac, Chronologie des archevêques, évêques et abbés de l'ancienne Province ecclésiastique d'Auch et des diocèses de Condom et de Lombez, 1300-1801, Paris-Auch 1912, pp. 161–166
- Lombez, Évêché rural 1317-1801, from the municipal website
- Pius Bonifacius Gams, Series episcoporum Ecclesiae Catholicae, Leipzig 1931, pp. 568–569
- Konrad Eubel, Hierarchia Catholica Medii Aevi, vol. 1, p. 310; vol. 2, p. 179; vol. 3, p. 227; vol. 4, p. 223; vol. 5, p. 250; vol. 6, p. 269
- Papal bullas 'Salvator noster', in Bullarum diplomatum et privilegiorum sanctorum Romanorum pontificum Taurinensis editio, Vol. IV, pp. 245–247 and 'Qui Christi Domini', in Bullarii romani continuatio, vol. XI, Rome 1845, pp. 245–249
