= Pompiac =

- Commune
- Location of Pompiac
- Location within France Location within Occitanie
- Coordinates: 43°30′50″N 1°00′29″E
- Country: France
- Region: Occitania
- Department: Gers
- Arrondissement: Auch
- Canton: Val de Save

Government
  - Mayor (2020–2026): Bernard Daubert
- Area^{1}: 10.12 km^{2} (3.91 sq mi)
- Elevation: 257 m (843 ft)
- Highest elevation: 256 m (840 ft)
- Lowest elevation: 151 m (495 ft)
- Population (2023): 205
  - Density: 20.3/km^{2} (52.5/sq mi)
- Time zone: UTC+01:00 (CET)
  - Summer (DST): UTC+02:00 (CEST)
- INSEE/Postal code: 32322 /32130
- ^{1} French Land Register data, which excludes lakes, ponds, glaciers > 1 km^{2} (0.386 sq mi or 247 acres) and river estuaries.

Pompiac (French pronunciation: [pɔ̃pjak]) is a commune in the Gers department in southwestern France.

== Geography ==
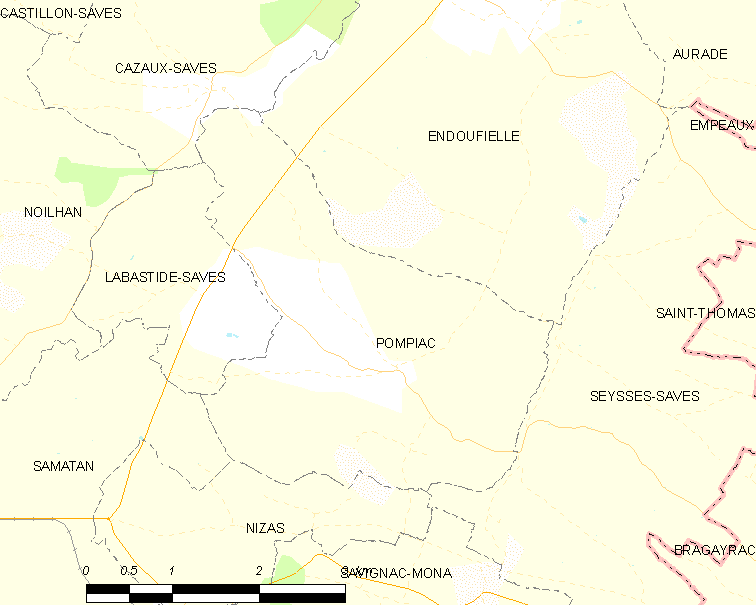
Pompiac and its surrounding communes

== Population ==
Historical population
Year	Pop.	±% p.a.
1968	139	—
1975	135	−0.42%
1982	126	−0.98%
1990	146	+1.86%
1999	144	−0.15%
2007	168	+1.95%
2012	178	+1.16%
2017	191	+1.42%
2023	205	+1.19%
Source: INSEE

== See also ==
- Communes of the Gers department
- Savès
