= Seysses-Savès =

- Commune
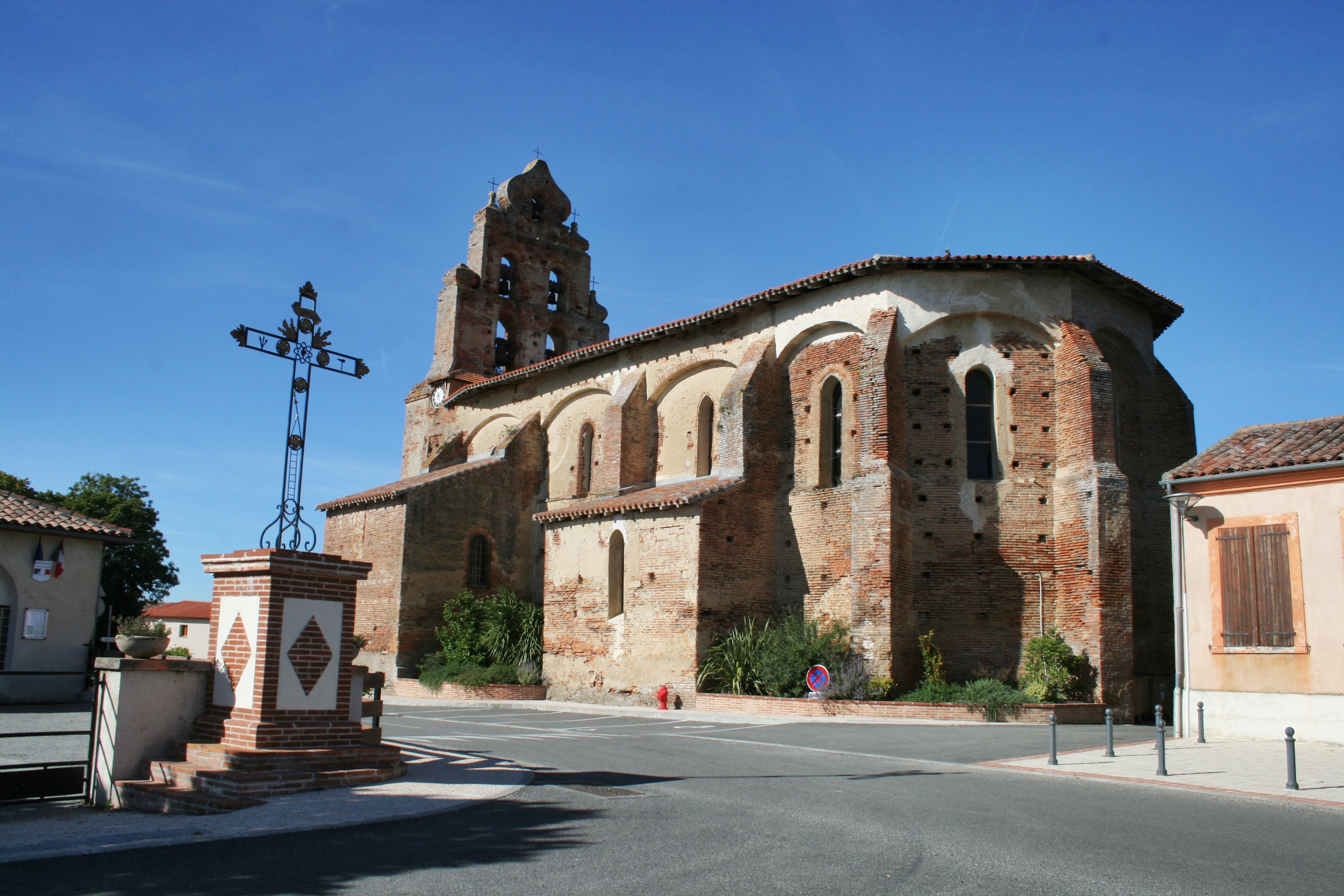
- The church in Seysses-Savès
- Location of Seysses-Savès
- Location within France Location within Occitanie
- Coordinates: 43°30′26″N 1°02′32″E
- Country: France
- Region: Occitania
- Department: Gers
- Arrondissement: Auch
- Canton: Val de Save
- Intercommunality: Savès

Government
  - Mayor (2020–2026): Michel Tenne
- Area^{1}: 13.26 km^{2} (5.12 sq mi)
- Elevation: 238 m (781 ft)
- Highest elevation: 268 m (879 ft)
- Lowest elevation: 165 m (541 ft)
- Population (2023): 244
  - Density: 18.4/km^{2} (47.7/sq mi)
- Time zone: UTC+01:00 (CET)
  - Summer (DST): UTC+02:00 (CEST)
- INSEE/Postal code: 32432 /32130
- ^{1} French Land Register data, which excludes lakes, ponds, glaciers > 1 km^{2} (0.386 sq mi or 247 acres) and river estuaries.

Seysses-Savès (French pronunciation: [sɛs savɛs]; Occitan: Seishas de Savés) is a commune in the Gers department in southwestern France.

== Geography ==
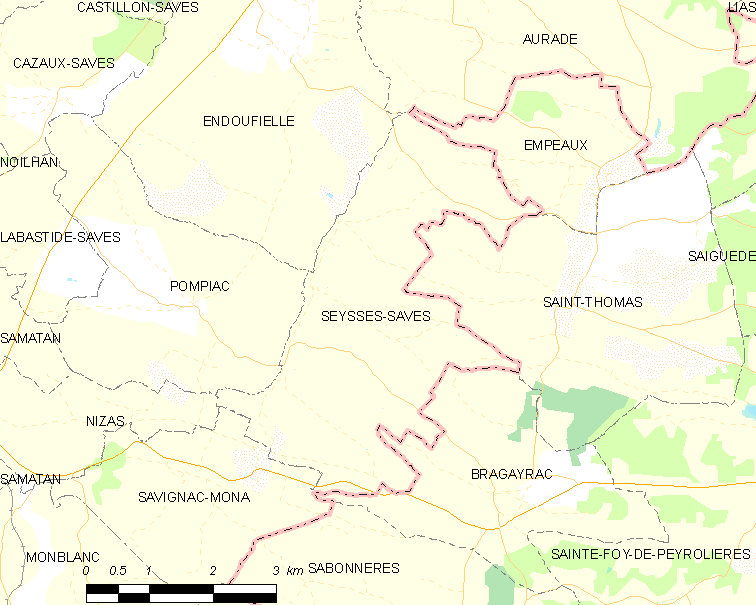
Seysse-Savès and its surrounding communes

== Population ==
Historical population
Year	Pop.	±% p.a.
1968	222	—
1975	199	−1.55%
1982	202	+0.21%
1990	217	+0.90%
1999	241	+1.17%
2007	259	+0.90%
2012	251	−0.63%
2017	239	−0.98%
2023	244	+0.35%
Source: INSEE

== See also ==
- Communes of the Gers department
- Savès
