= Samatan =

- Commune
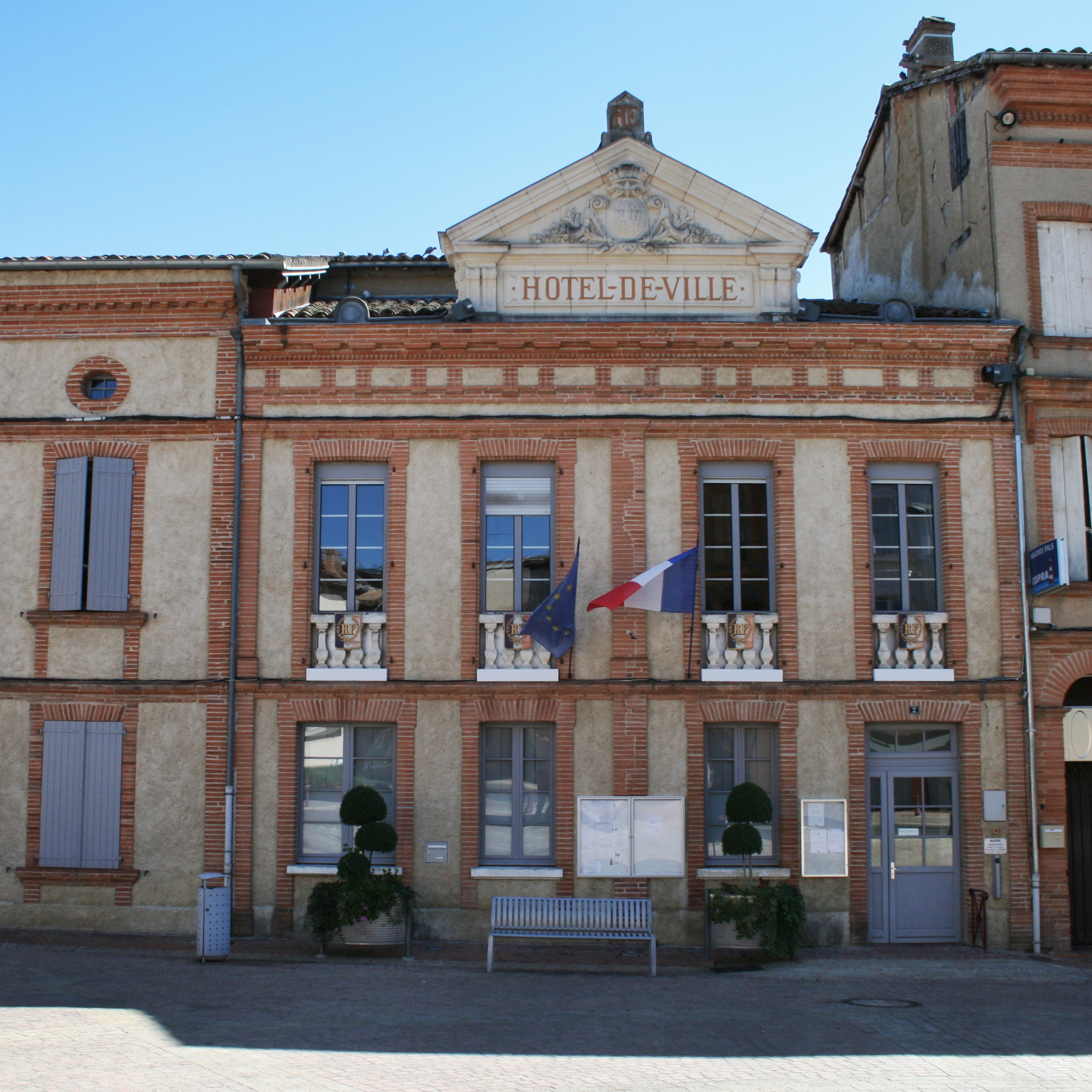
- Samatan Town Hall

- Coat of arms
- Location of Samatan
- Location within France Location within Occitanie
- Coordinates: 43°29′37″N 0°55′54″E
- Country: France
- Region: Occitania
- Department: Gers
- Arrondissement: Auch
- Canton: Val de Save
- Intercommunality: Savès

Government
  - Mayor (2020–2026): Hervé Lefebvre
- Area^{1}: 33.53 km^{2} (12.95 sq mi)
- Elevation: 165 m (541 ft)
- Highest elevation: 252 m (827 ft)
- Lowest elevation: 155 m (509 ft)
- Population (2023): 2,517
  - Density: 75.07/km^{2} (194.4/sq mi)
- Time zone: UTC+01:00 (CET)
  - Summer (DST): UTC+02:00 (CEST)
- INSEE/Postal code: 32410 /32130
- ^{1} French Land Register data, which excludes lakes, ponds, glaciers > 1 km^{2} (0.386 sq mi or 247 acres) and river estuaries.

Samatan (French pronunciation: [samatɑ̃]) is a commune in the Gers department in the Occitania region in Southwestern France. Culturally and historically, the commune is part of the Savès, a province of Gascony. It is situated 36 km southwest of Toulouse, residing within Toulouse's functional area, a statistical area used by INSEE to designate metropolitan areas. Samatan has an oceanic climate and has a remarkable natural patrimony, having multiple Zones naturelles d'intérêt écologique, faunistique et floristique, a type of natural environment recognized by France. The inhabitants are called Samatanais or Samatanaises in French.

== Geography ==
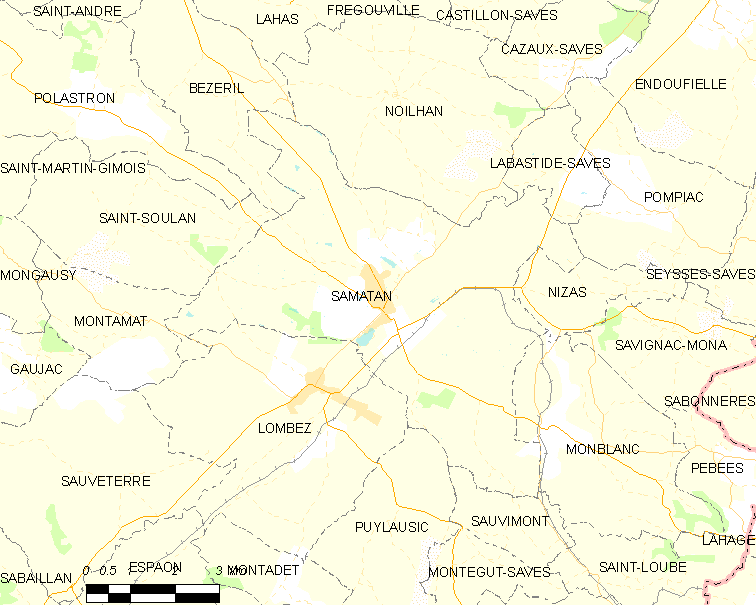
Samatan and its surrounding communes

== Demographics ==
Historical population
Year	Pop.	±% p.a.
1968	1,934	—
1975	1,840	−0.71%
1982	1,831	−0.07%
1990	1,716	−0.81%
1999	1,832	+0.73%
2007	2,214	+2.40%
2012	2,378	+1.44%
2017	2,370	−0.07%
2023	2,517	+1.01%
Source: INSEE

== Heraldry ==
Samatan	Quarterly, gules with four silver otelles placed in saltire, and of the first with three gold fleur-de-lis sceptres placed in pale and arranged in fess, on a chief sewn of France.

== See also ==
- Communes of the Gers department
- Savès
