= Lias, Gers =

Lias
- Commune
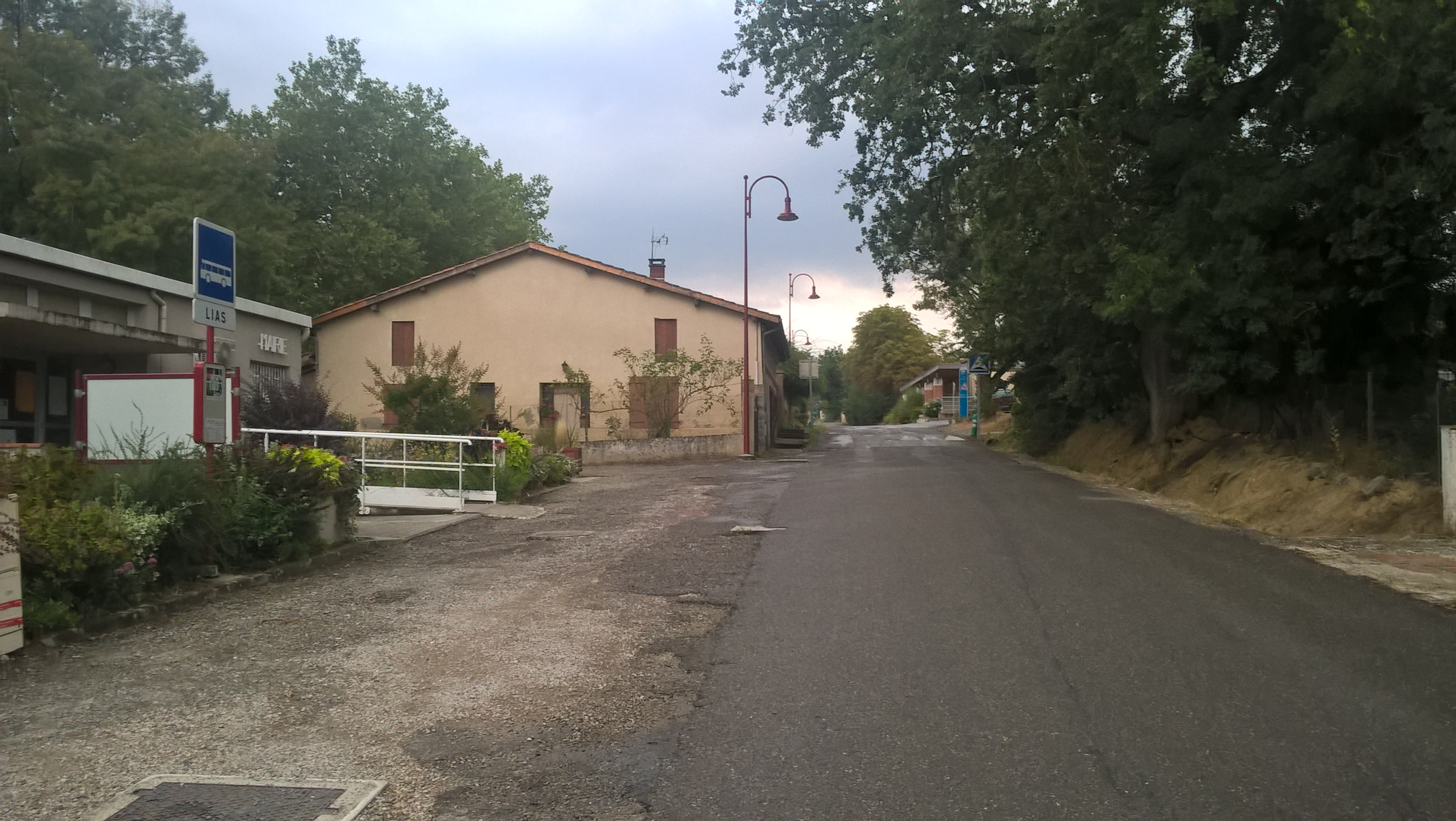
- Outside the town hall in Lias

- Coat of arms
- Location of Lias
- Location within France Location within Occitanie
- Coordinates: 43°33′48″N 1°08′09″E
- Country: France
- Region: Occitania
- Department: Gers
- Arrondissement: Auch
- Canton: L'Isle-Jourdain

Government
  - Mayor (2020–2026): Gérard Paul
- Area^{1}: 10.67 km^{2} (4.12 sq mi)
- Elevation: 305 m (1,001 ft)
- Highest elevation: 305 m (1,001 ft)
- Lowest elevation: 172 m (564 ft)
- Population (2023): 794
  - Density: 74.4/km^{2} (193/sq mi)
- Time zone: UTC+01:00 (CET)
  - Summer (DST): UTC+02:00 (CEST)
- INSEE/Postal code: 32210 /32600
- ^{1} French Land Register data, which excludes lakes, ponds, glaciers > 1 km^{2} (0.386 sq mi or 247 acres) and river estuaries.

Lias (French pronunciation: [ljas]; Occitan: Liars) is a commune in the Gers department in southwestern France.

== Geography ==
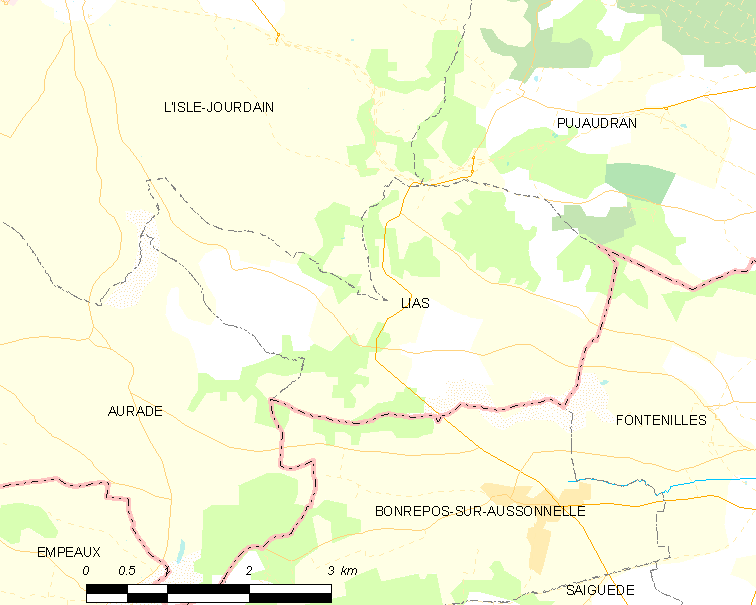
Lias and its surrounding communes

== Population ==
Historical population
Year	Pop.	±% p.a.
1968	157	—
1975	120	−3.77%
1982	174	+5.45%
1990	204	+2.01%
1999	315	+4.95%
2007	449	+4.53%
2012	519	+2.94%
2017	620	+3.62%
2023	794	+4.21%
Source: INSEE

== See also ==
- Communes of the Gers department
