= Ségoufielle =

- Commune
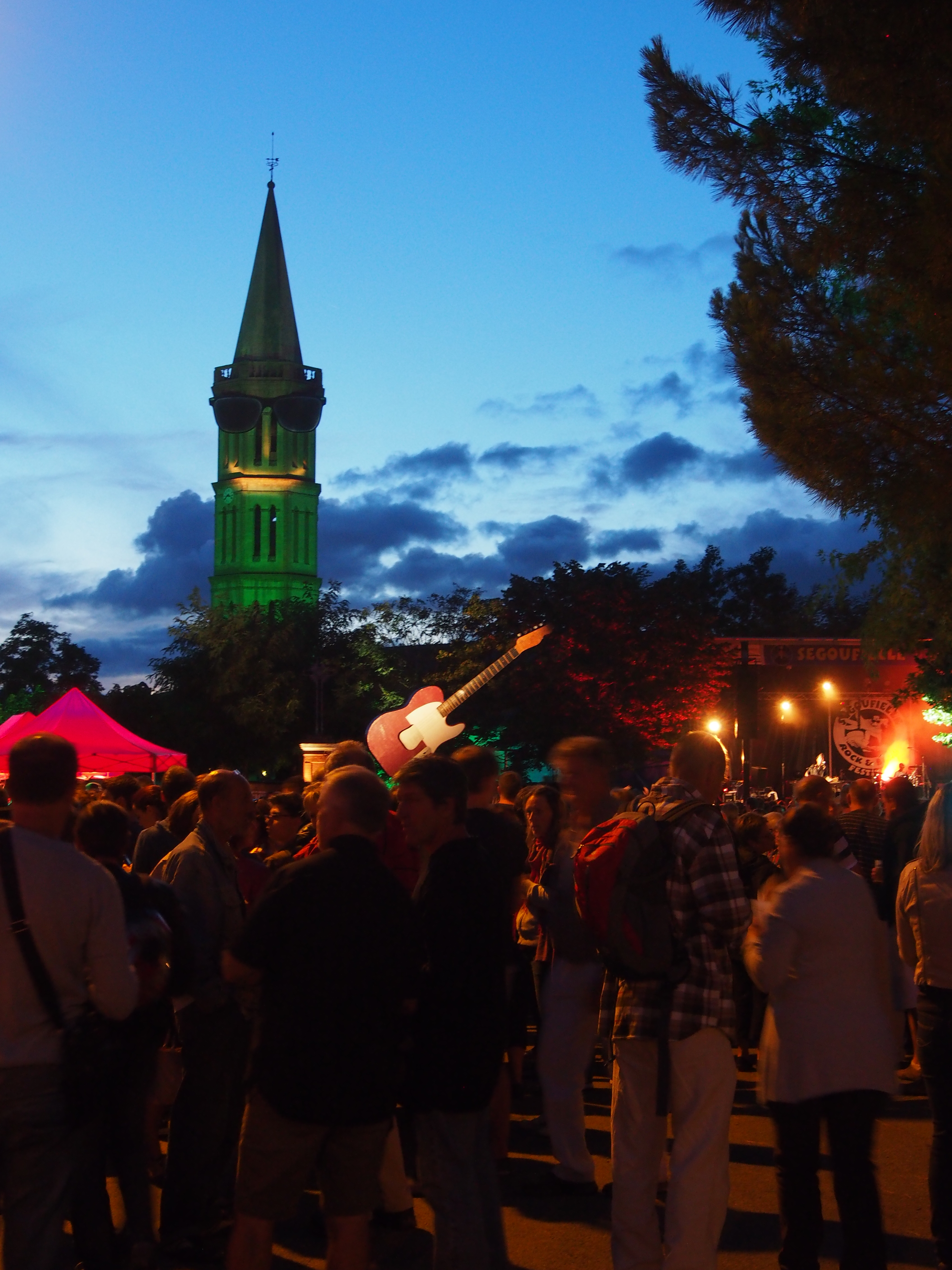
- Blues & rock festival in Ségoufielle

- Coat of arms
- Location of Ségoufielle
- Location within France Location within Occitanie
- Coordinates: 43°37′56″N 1°07′53″E
- Country: France
- Region: Occitania
- Department: Gers
- Arrondissement: Auch
- Canton: L'Isle-Jourdain
- Intercommunality: Gascogne Toulousaine

Government
  - Mayor (2020–2026): Georges Belou
- Area^{1}: 5.24 km^{2} (2.02 sq mi)
- Elevation: 150 m (490 ft)
- Highest elevation: 213 m (699 ft)
- Lowest elevation: 134 m (440 ft)
- Population (2023): 1,197
  - Density: 228/km^{2} (592/sq mi)
- Time zone: UTC+01:00 (CET)
  - Summer (DST): UTC+02:00 (CEST)
- INSEE/Postal code: 32425 /32600
- ^{1} French Land Register data, which excludes lakes, ponds, glaciers > 1 km^{2} (0.386 sq mi or 247 acres) and river estuaries.

Ségoufielle (French pronunciation: [seɡufjɛl]; Segofièla in the Gascon dialect of the Occitan language) is a commune in the Gers department in the Occitanie region of southwestern France.

== Geography ==
Ségoufielle is situated 40 km to the west of Toulouse in the valley of the Save river, between L'Isle-Jourdain and Lévignac-sur-Save. The nearest railway station is Merenvielle, 1.5 km to the east, on the line connecting Toulouse and Auch.

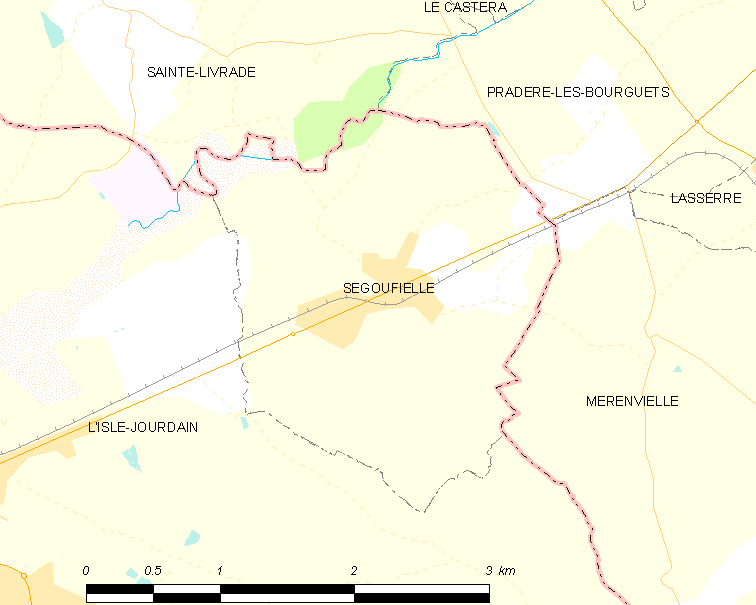
Ségoufielle and its surrounding communes

== Population ==
Historical population
Year	Pop.	±% p.a.
1968	260	—
1975	367	+5.05%
1982	386	+0.72%
1990	517	+3.72%
1999	653	+2.63%
2007	866	+3.59%
2012	1,032	+3.57%
2017	1,138	+1.97%
2023	1,197	+0.85%
Source: INSEE

== See also ==
- Communes of the Gers department
