= Lombez Cathedral =

Cathedral in Gers, France

Coordinates: 43°28′28″N 0°54′38″E

Lombez Cathedral Cathédrale Sainte-Marie de Lombez
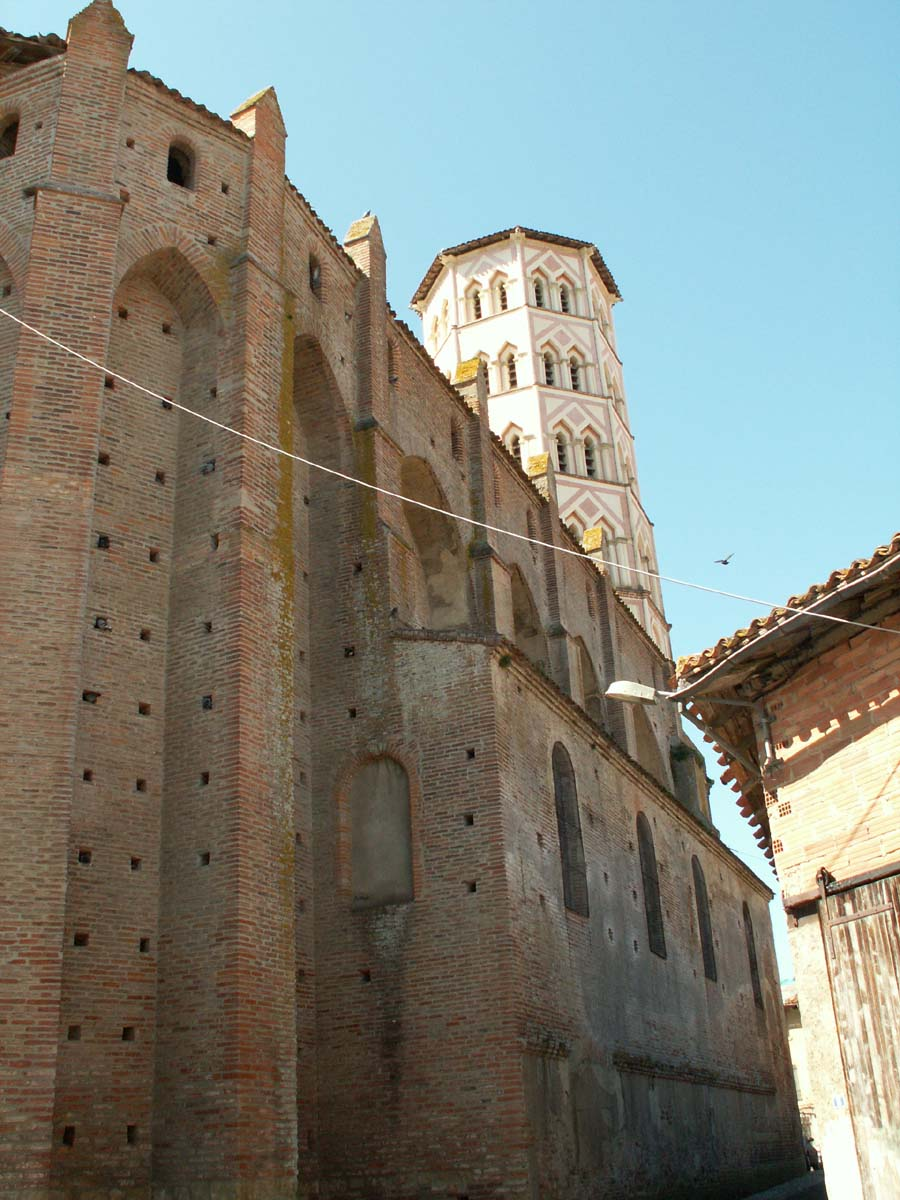
- Lombez Cathedral

Religion
- Affiliation: Roman Catholic Church
- Province: Diocese of Lombez
- Region: Ariège
- Rite: Roman
- Ecclesiastical or organisational status: Cathedral
- Status: Active

Location
- Location: Lombez, France
- Interactive map of Lombez Cathedral; Cathédrale Sainte-Marie de Lombez

Architecture
- Type: church
- Style: Southern French Gothic, Flamboyant gothic
- Groundbreaking: 14th-century

Lombez Cathedral (Cathédrale Sainte-Marie de Lombez; Église Notre-Dame) is a Roman Catholic church, formerly a cathedral, in Lombez, France. It has been a monument historique since 1846.

It was the seat of the former Diocese of Lombez, suppressed by the Concordat of 1801 and divided between the Diocese of Bayonne and the Archdiocese of Toulouse.

== Building history ==
This is a 14th-century brick church with an ornate pink-and-white five-tiered octagonal bell tower constructed c. 1346. A plaque to the right of the plain west entrance records the visit of the Italian poet Petrarch in 1330, arranged by the bishop, Jacques Colonna (1328–41), also of Italian extraction, who made Petrarch an honorary canon in 1335. The typical blank west façade of Southern French Gothic is relieved only by a small roundel and the Flamboyant entrance in stone. The severe exterior is characteristic of the Toulouse region with tall buttresses around the chevet.

Below the tower in the interior is a remarkable 12th-century baptistry, which was part of an earlier church. The lead baptismal font is made of two pieces, the lower part decorated with religious figures in medallions in the style of the 13th century, and the upper part with a frieze of secular scenes of antique design. The stopper in the base suggests it was used for total immersion which was practised until the 9th century.

Other items of note are the 17th-century walnut choir stalls, the altar in Carrara marble consecrated in 1753, and the 18th-century organ at the west end. The three panels of brilliantly colored 15th–16th-century glass in the chevet are by the followers of Arnaud de Moles, restored in the 19th century, and illustrate scenes from the Life of Christ and from the Passion. The rest of the glass is 19th-century.
