= Johann Hiltalinger =

Johann Hiltalinger (known also as John of Basel, Johannes Angelus) (1315?–1392) was a Swiss Augustinian theologian who became Bishop of Lombez.

== Life ==
Born at Basel, he entered the Augustinian order and received the degree of master of theology at the University of Paris in 1371. From 1371 to 1377 he was provincial in the Rhenish-Swabian province of the order. He again held this post in 1379, being general procurator in the intervening period.

At the outbreak of the Great Western Schism, he sided with Pope Clement VI, who made him general prior of the order in September 1379. He became an activist for Clement, particularly in the Upper Rhine country. After his elevation to the see of Lombez in 1380 he remained Clement's confidential man on the Upper Rhine and continued to work at Freiburg for the curia of the Avignon Papacy. He died at Freiburg in 1392.

== Works ==
He wrote, among other things, Commentaria in libros sententiarum. Together with others, he is praised as a peak of Augustinian scholarship in the Middle Ages.
