= Clermont-Savès =

- Commune
- Coat of arms
- Location of Clermont-Savès
- Location within France Location within Occitanie
- Coordinates: 43°37′06″N 1°01′49″E
- Country: France
- Region: Occitania
- Department: Gers
- Arrondissement: Auch
- Canton: L'Isle-Jourdain

Government
  - Mayor (2020–2026): Gaëtan Longo
- Area^{1}: 5.1 km^{2} (2.0 sq mi)
- Elevation: 154 m (505 ft)
- Highest elevation: 216 m (709 ft)
- Lowest elevation: 154 m (505 ft)
- Population (2023): 387
  - Density: 76/km^{2} (200/sq mi)
- Time zone: UTC+01:00 (CET)
  - Summer (DST): UTC+02:00 (CEST)
- INSEE/Postal code: 32105 /32600
- ^{1} French Land Register data, which excludes lakes, ponds, glaciers > 1 km^{2} (0.386 sq mi or 247 acres) and river estuaries.

Clermont-Savès (French pronunciation: [klɛʁmɔ̃ savɛs]; Occitan: Clarmont de Savés) is a commune in the Gers department in southwestern France.

== Geography ==
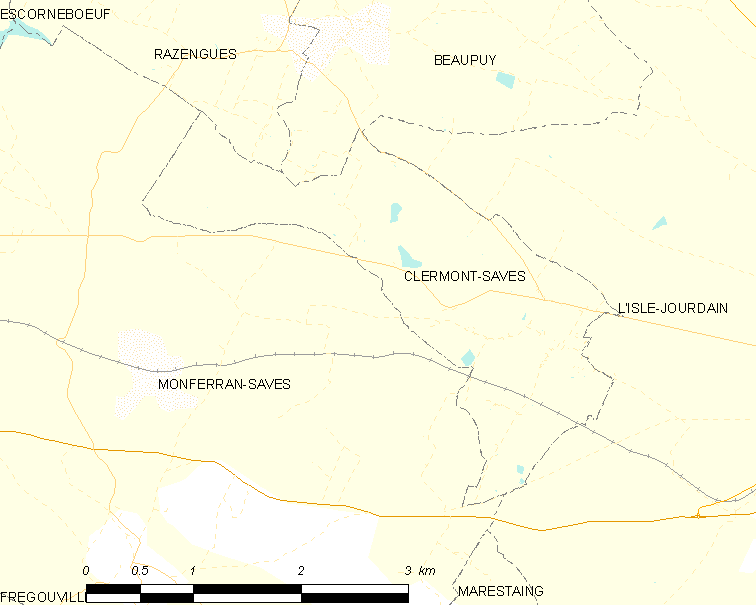
Clermont-Savès and its surrounding communes

== Population ==
Historical population
Year	Pop.	±% p.a.
1968	84	—
1975	100	+2.52%
1982	109	+1.24%
1990	137	+2.90%
1999	164	+2.02%
2007	231	+4.37%
2012	254	+1.92%
2017	326	+5.12%
2023	387	+2.90%
Source: INSEE

== See also ==
- Communes of the Gers department
