= Lombez =

- Commune
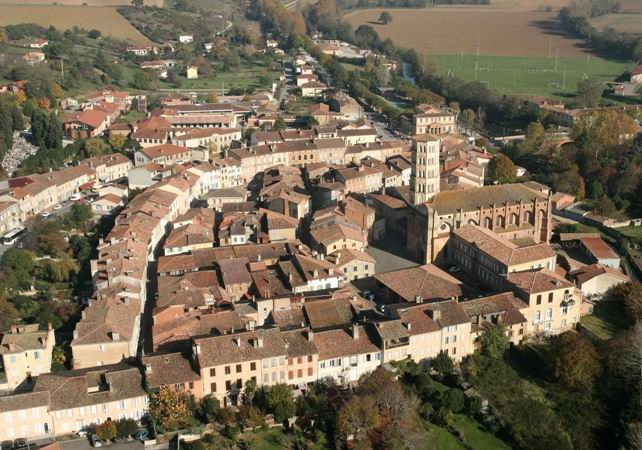
- An aerial view of Lombez

- Coat of arms
- Location of Lombez
- Location within France Location within Occitanie
- Coordinates: 43°28′32″N 0°54′40″E
- Country: France
- Region: Occitania
- Department: Gers
- Arrondissement: Auch
- Canton: Val de Save

Government
  - Mayor (2020–2026): Jean-Pierre Cot
- Area^{1}: 19.55 km^{2} (7.55 sq mi)
- Elevation: 167 m (548 ft)
- Highest elevation: 286 m (938 ft)
- Lowest elevation: 162 m (531 ft)
- Population (2023): 2,233
  - Density: 114.2/km^{2} (295.8/sq mi)
- Time zone: UTC+01:00 (CET)
  - Summer (DST): UTC+02:00 (CEST)
- INSEE/Postal code: 32213 /32220
- ^{1} French Land Register data, which excludes lakes, ponds, glaciers > 1 km^{2} (0.386 sq mi or 247 acres) and river estuaries.

Lombez (French pronunciation: [lɔ̃bɛz] or [lɔ̃bɛs]; Occitan: Lombèrs) is a commune in the Gers department in southwestern France. Culturally and historically, the commune is part of the Savès, a province of Gascony, which corresponds roughly to the surroundings of the Save river. Lombez has an oceanic climate, and is part of the watershed area of the Save, Espienne, and other smaller sources of water. As of 2023, the population of the commune was 2,233. Lombez is a rural commune, located in Toulouse’s functional area, a statistical area used by INSEE to designate metropolitan areas. Their inhabitants are called Lombéziens or Lombéziennes.

== Geography ==
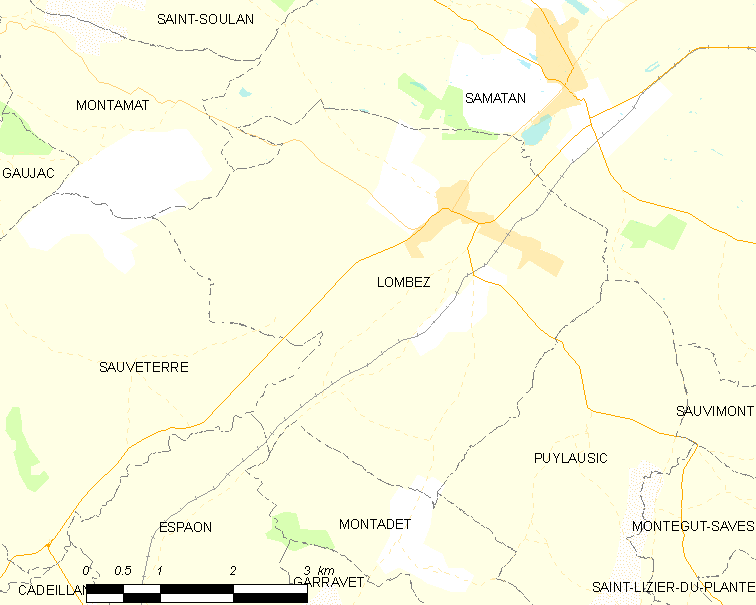
Lombez and its surrounding communes

== Population ==
Historical population
Year	Pop.	±% p.a.
1968	1,331	—
1975	1,301	−0.33%
1982	1,239	−0.70%
1990	1,325	+0.84%
1999	1,401	+0.62%
2007	1,759	+2.89%
2012	2,018	+2.79%
2017	2,134	+1.12%
2023	2,233	+0.76%
Source: INSEE

== See also ==
- Lombez Cathedral
- Communes of the Gers department
- Savès
