= Cazaux-Savès =

- Commune
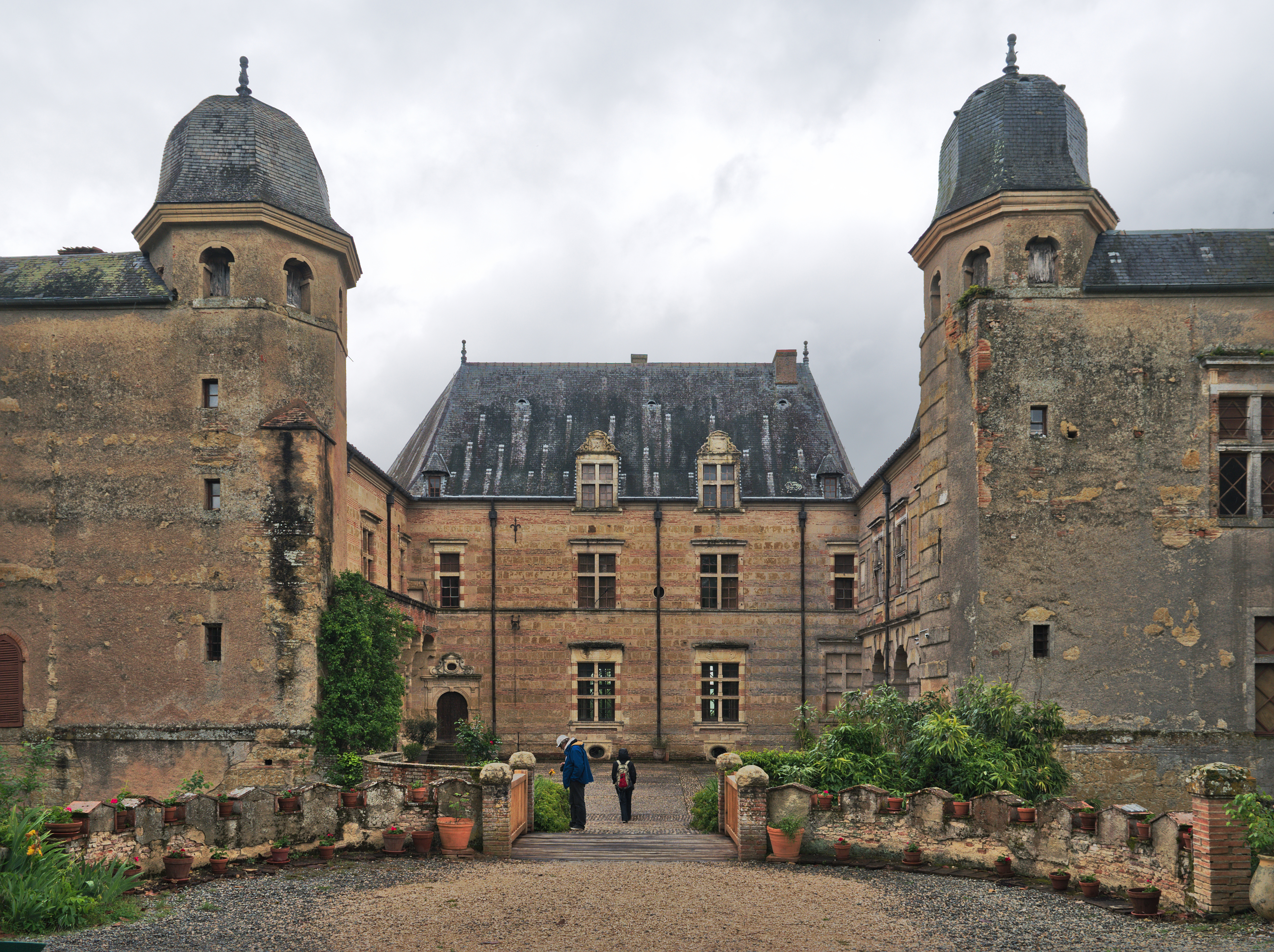
- The château of Caumont in Cazaux-Savès

- Coat of arms
- Location of Cazaux-Savès
- Location within France Location within Occitanie
- Coordinates: 43°32′00″N 0°58′00″E
- Country: France
- Region: Occitania
- Department: Gers
- Arrondissement: Auch
- Canton: Val de Save
- Intercommunality: Savès

Government
  - Mayor (2023–2026): Véronique Brumas-Retailleau
- Area^{1}: 5.62 km^{2} (2.17 sq mi)
- Elevation: 154 m (505 ft)
- Highest elevation: 241 m (791 ft)
- Lowest elevation: 150 m (490 ft)
- Population (2023): 326
  - Density: 58.0/km^{2} (150/sq mi)
- Time zone: UTC+01:00 (CET)
  - Summer (DST): UTC+02:00 (CEST)
- INSEE/Postal code: 32098 /32130
- ^{1} French Land Register data, which excludes lakes, ponds, glaciers > 1 km^{2} (0.386 sq mi or 247 acres) and river estuaries.

Cazaux-Savès (French pronunciation: [kazo savɛs]; Occitan: Casaus de Savés) is a commune in the Gers department in southwestern France.

== Geography ==
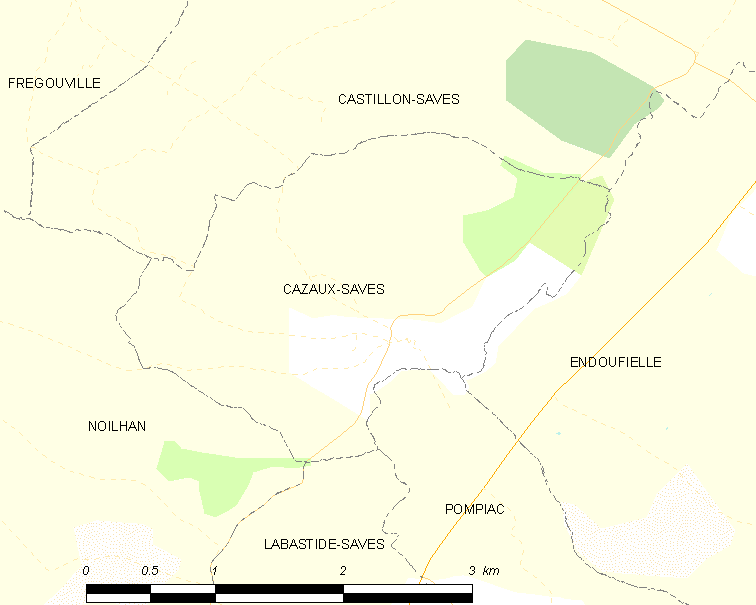
Cazaux-Savès and its surrounding communes

== Population ==
Historical population
Year	Pop.	±% p.a.
1968	137	—
1975	145	+0.81%
1982	120	−2.67%
1990	134	+1.39%
1999	138	+0.33%
2007	236	+6.94%
2012	291	+4.28%
2017	315	+1.60%
2023	326	+0.57%
Source: INSEE

== See also ==
- Communes of the Gers department
