= Frégouville =

- Commune
- Coat of arms
- Location of Frégouville
- Location within France Location within Occitanie
- Coordinates: 43°35′23″N 0°57′18″E
- Country: France
- Region: Occitania
- Department: Gers
- Arrondissement: Auch
- Canton: L'Isle-Jourdain

Government
  - Mayor (2020–2026): Jean-Claude Darolles
- Area^{1}: 12.32 km^{2} (4.76 sq mi)
- Elevation: 240 m (790 ft)
- Highest elevation: 252 m (827 ft)
- Lowest elevation: 159 m (522 ft)
- Population (2023): 369
  - Density: 30.0/km^{2} (77.6/sq mi)
- Time zone: UTC+01:00 (CET)
  - Summer (DST): UTC+02:00 (CEST)
- INSEE/Postal code: 32134 /32490
- ^{1} French Land Register data, which excludes lakes, ponds, glaciers > 1 km^{2} (0.386 sq mi or 247 acres) and river estuaries.

Frégouville (French pronunciation: [fʁeɡuvil]; Occitan: Fregovièla) is a commune in the Gers department in southwestern France.

== Geography ==
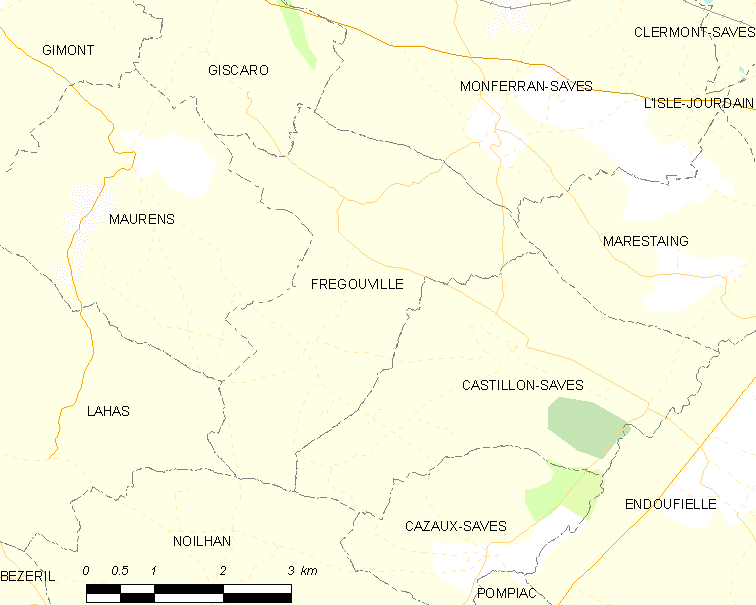
Frégouville and its surrounding communes

== Population ==
Historical population
Year	Pop.	±% p.a.
1968	197	—
1975	167	−2.33%
1982	178	+0.92%
1990	191	+0.89%
1999	201	+0.57%
2007	298	+5.05%
2012	333	+2.25%
2017	346	+0.77%
2023	369	+1.08%
Source: INSEE

== See also ==
- Communes of the Gers department
