= Castillon-Savès =

- Commune
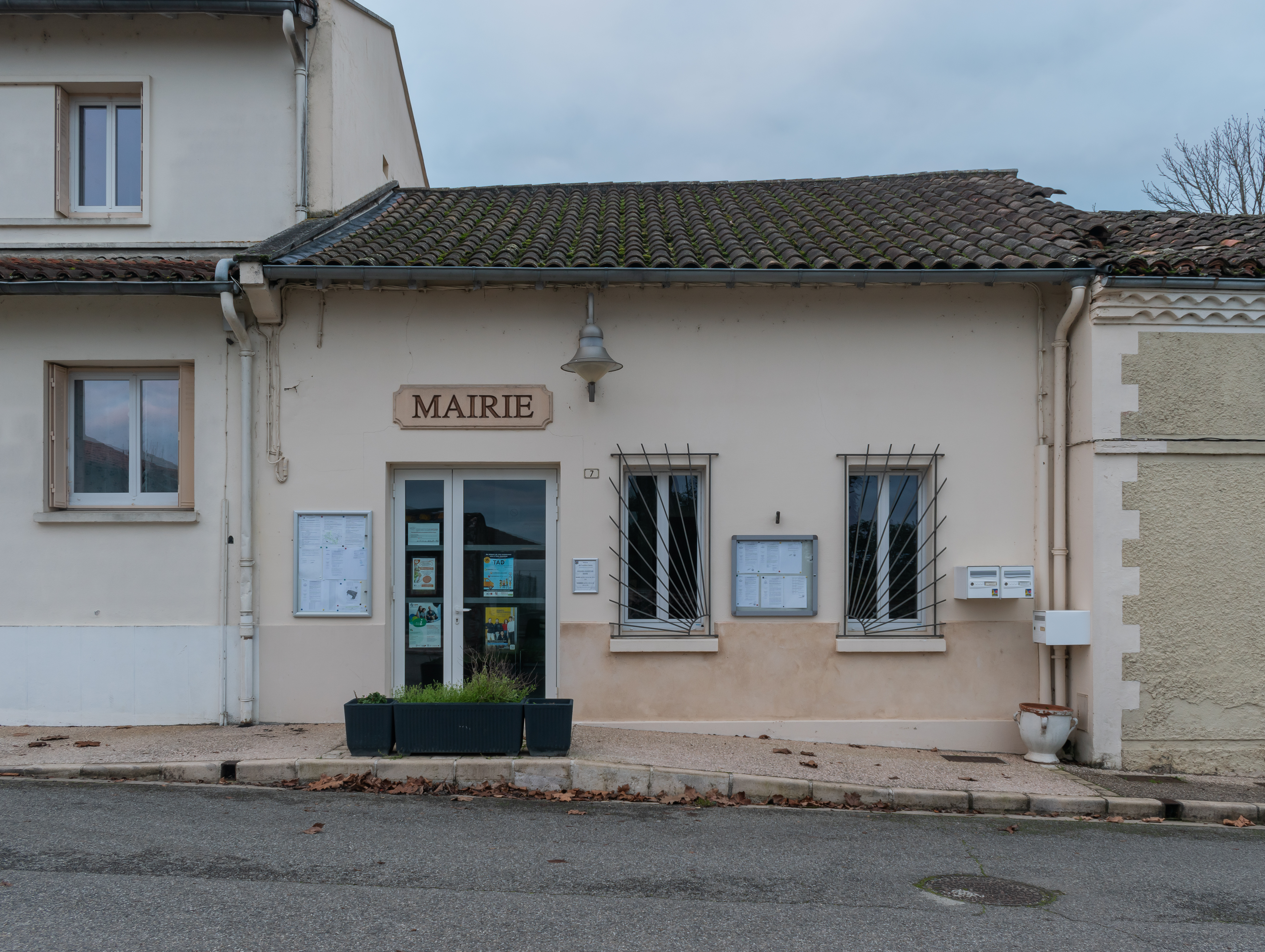

- Coat of arms
- Location of Castillon-Savès
- Location within France Location within Occitanie
- Coordinates: 43°34′14″N 0°59′11″E
- Country: France
- Region: Occitania
- Department: Gers
- Arrondissement: Auch
- Canton: Val de Save

Government
  - Mayor (2020–2026): Julien Délix
- Area^{1}: 11.96 km^{2} (4.62 sq mi)
- Elevation: 214 m (702 ft)
- Highest elevation: 246 m (807 ft)
- Lowest elevation: 147 m (482 ft)
- Population (2023): 332
  - Density: 27.8/km^{2} (71.9/sq mi)
- Time zone: UTC+01:00 (CET)
  - Summer (DST): UTC+02:00 (CEST)
- INSEE/Postal code: 32090 /32490
- ^{1} French Land Register data, which excludes lakes, ponds, glaciers > 1 km^{2} (0.386 sq mi or 247 acres) and river estuaries.

Castillon-Savès (French pronunciation: [kastijɔ̃ savɛs]; Occitan: Castilhon de Savés) is a commune in the Gers department in southwestern France.

== Geography ==
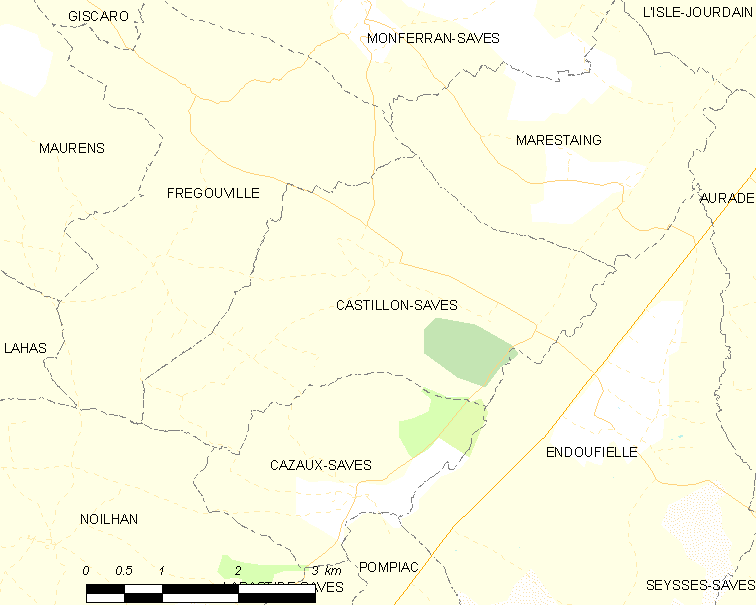
Castillon-Savès and its surrounding communes

== Population ==
Historical population
Year	Pop.	±% p.a.
1968	217	—
1975	160	−4.26%
1982	170	+0.87%
1990	174	+0.29%
1999	206	+1.89%
2007	298	+4.72%
2012	282	−1.10%
2017	344	+4.05%
2023	332	−0.59%
Source: INSEE

== See also ==
- Communes of the Gers department
