= Monferran-Savès =

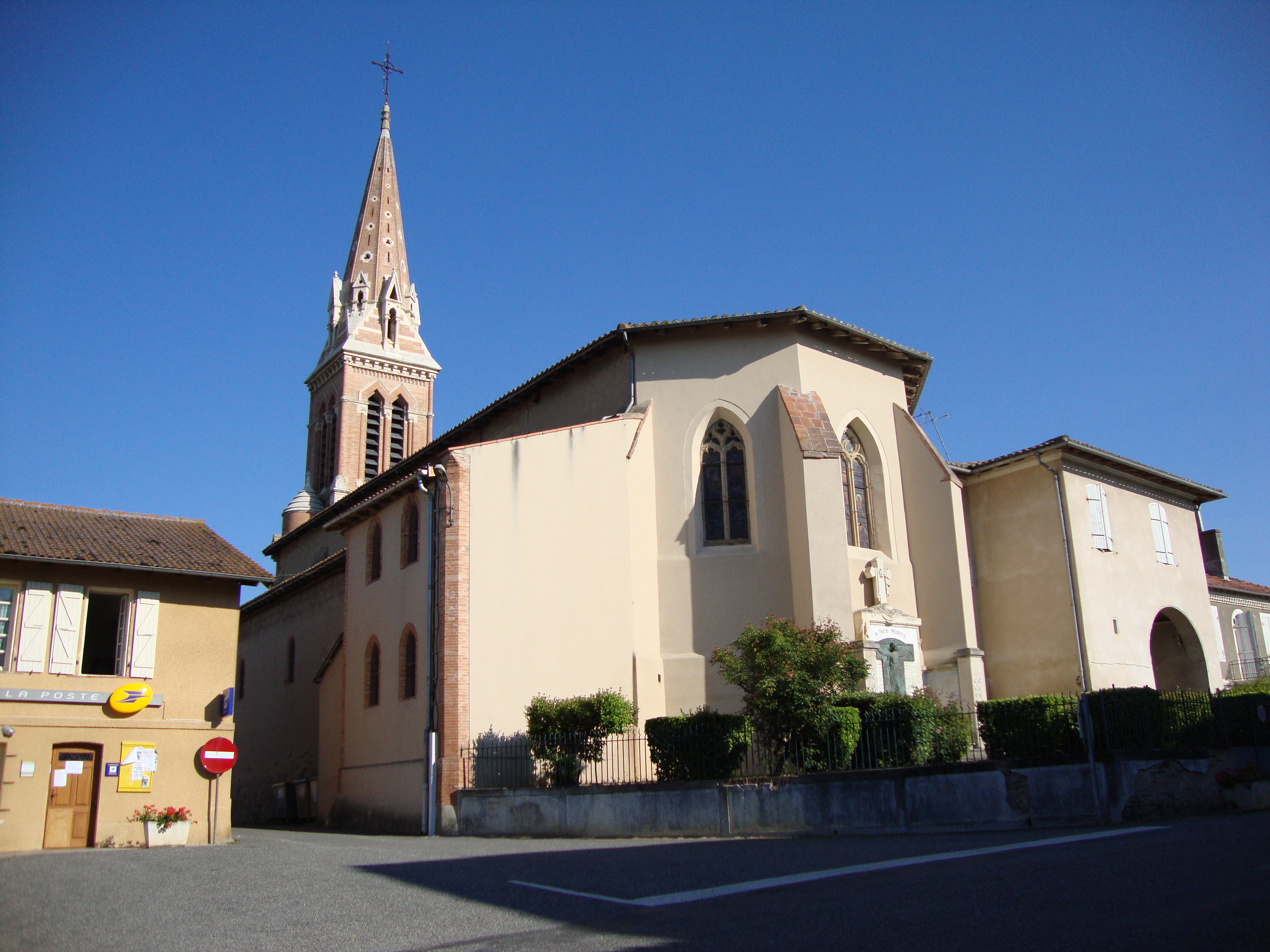
- The church in Monferran-Savès

- Coat of arms
- Location of Monferran-Savès
- Location within France Location within Occitanie
- Coordinates: 43°35′55″N 0°58′54″E
- Country: France
- Region: Occitania
- Department: Gers
- Arrondissement: Auch
- Canton: Isle-Jourdain

Government
  - Mayor (2021–2026): Maryelle Vidal
- Area^{1}: 24.68 km^{2} (9.53 sq mi)
- Elevation: 206 m (676 ft)
- Highest elevation: 241 m (791 ft)
- Lowest elevation: 155 m (509 ft)
- Population (2023): 790
  - Density: 32/km^{2} (83/sq mi)
- Time zone: UTC+01:00 (CET)
  - Summer (DST): UTC+02:00 (CEST)
- INSEE/Postal code: 32268 /32490
- ^{1} French Land Register data, which excludes lakes, ponds, glaciers > 1 km^{2} (0.386 sq mi or 247 acres) and river estuaries.

Monferran-Savès (French pronunciation: [mɔ̃fɛʁɑ̃ savɛs]; Occitan: Montferrand de Savés) is a commune in the Gers department in southwestern France.

== Geography ==
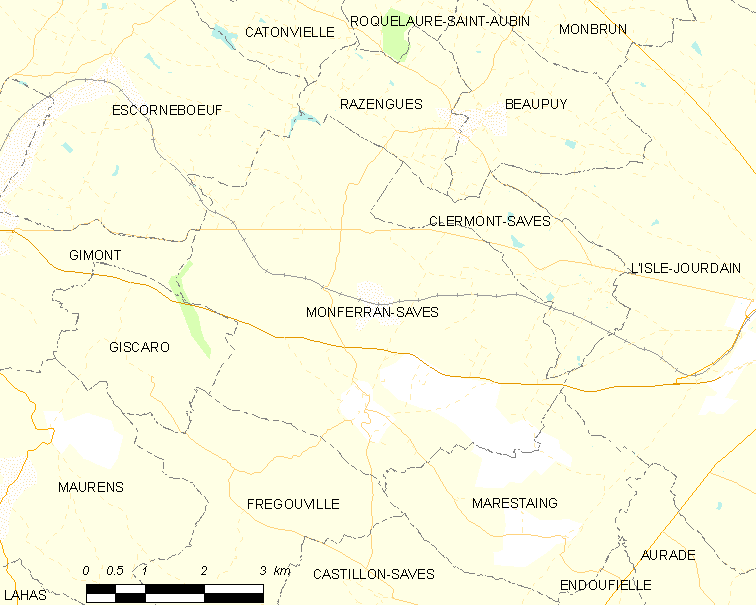
Monferran-Savès and its surrounding communes

== Population ==
Historical population
Year	Pop.	±% p.a.
1968	644	—
1975	551	−2.20%
1982	642	+2.21%
1990	617	−0.50%
1999	675	+1.00%
2007	692	+0.31%
2012	741	+1.38%
2017	803	+1.62%
2023	790	−0.27%
Source: INSEE

== See also ==
- Communes of the Gers department
