= Auradé =

- Commune
- Coat of arms
- Location of Auradé
- Location within France Location within Occitanie
- Coordinates: 43°34′02″N 1°03′30″E
- Country: France
- Region: Occitania
- Department: Gers
- Arrondissement: Auch
- Canton: L'Isle-Jourdain
- Intercommunality: CC Gascogne Toulousaine

Government
  - Mayor (2020–2026): Francis Larroque
- Area^{1}: 21.32 km^{2} (8.23 sq mi)
- Elevation: 162 m (531 ft)
- Highest elevation: 311 m (1,020 ft)
- Lowest elevation: 143 m (469 ft)
- Population (2023): 679
  - Density: 31.8/km^{2} (82.5/sq mi)
- Time zone: UTC+01:00 (CET)
  - Summer (DST): UTC+02:00 (CEST)
- INSEE/Postal code: 32016 /32600
- ^{1} French Land Register data, which excludes lakes, ponds, glaciers > 1 km^{2} (0.386 sq mi or 247 acres) and river estuaries.

Auradé (French pronunciation: [oʁade]; Occitan: Auradèr) is a commune in the Gers department in southwestern France.

== Geography ==
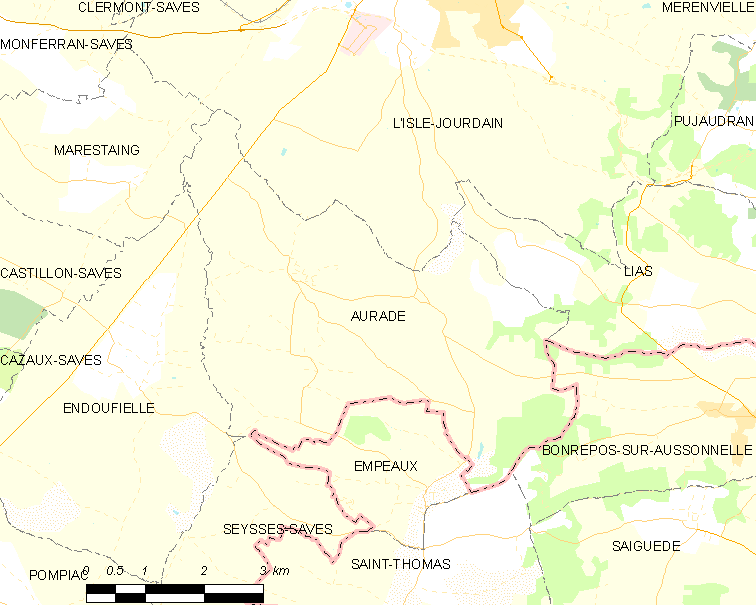
Auradé and its surrounding communes

== Population ==
Historical population
Year	Pop.	±% p.a.
1968	318	—
1975	320	+0.09%
1982	329	+0.40%
1990	322	−0.27%
1999	388	+2.09%
2007	550	+4.46%
2012	651	+3.43%
2017	671	+0.61%
2023	679	+0.20%
Source: INSEE

== See also ==
- Communes of the Gers department
