= List of people imprisoned for editing Wikipedia =

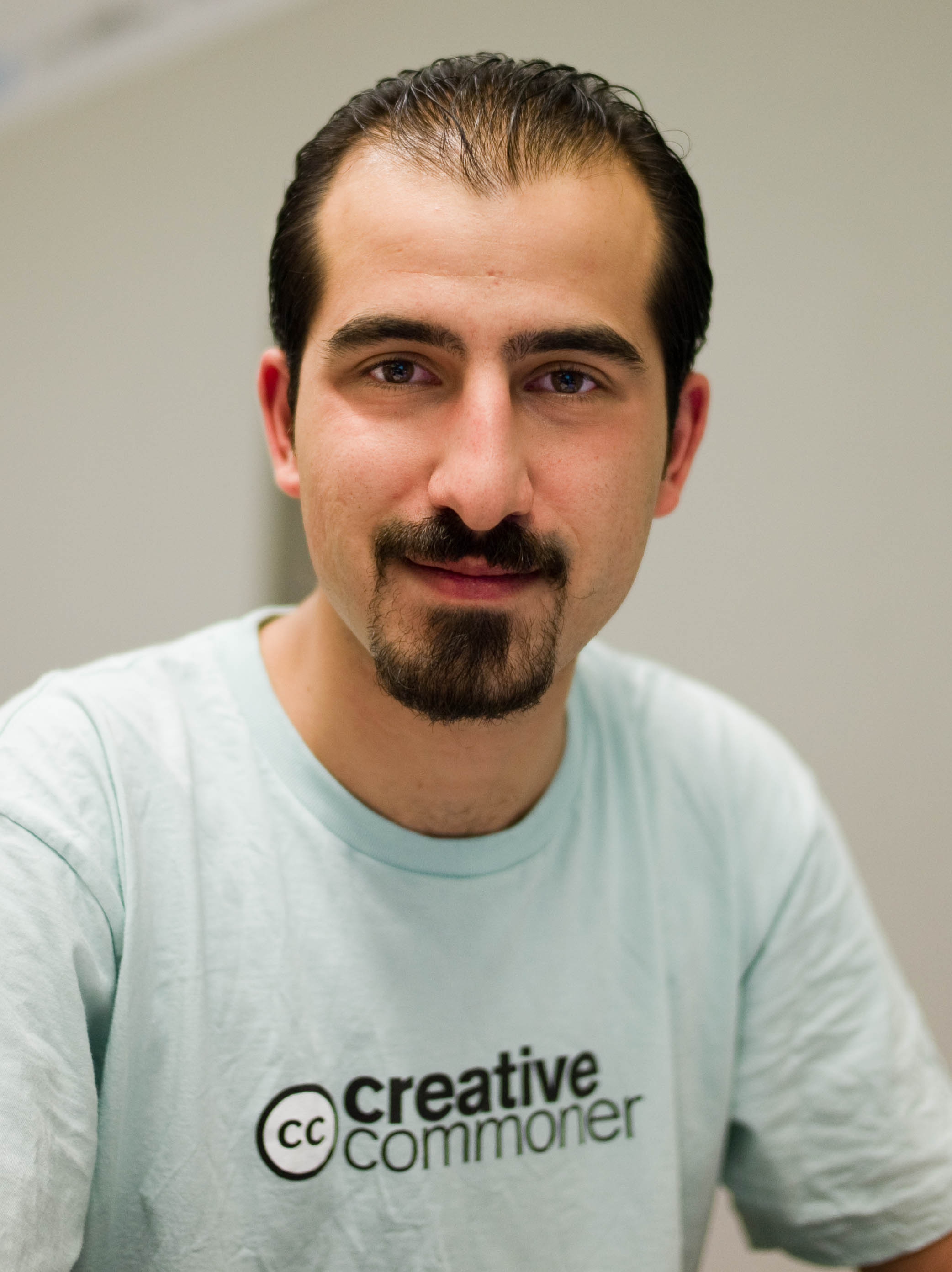
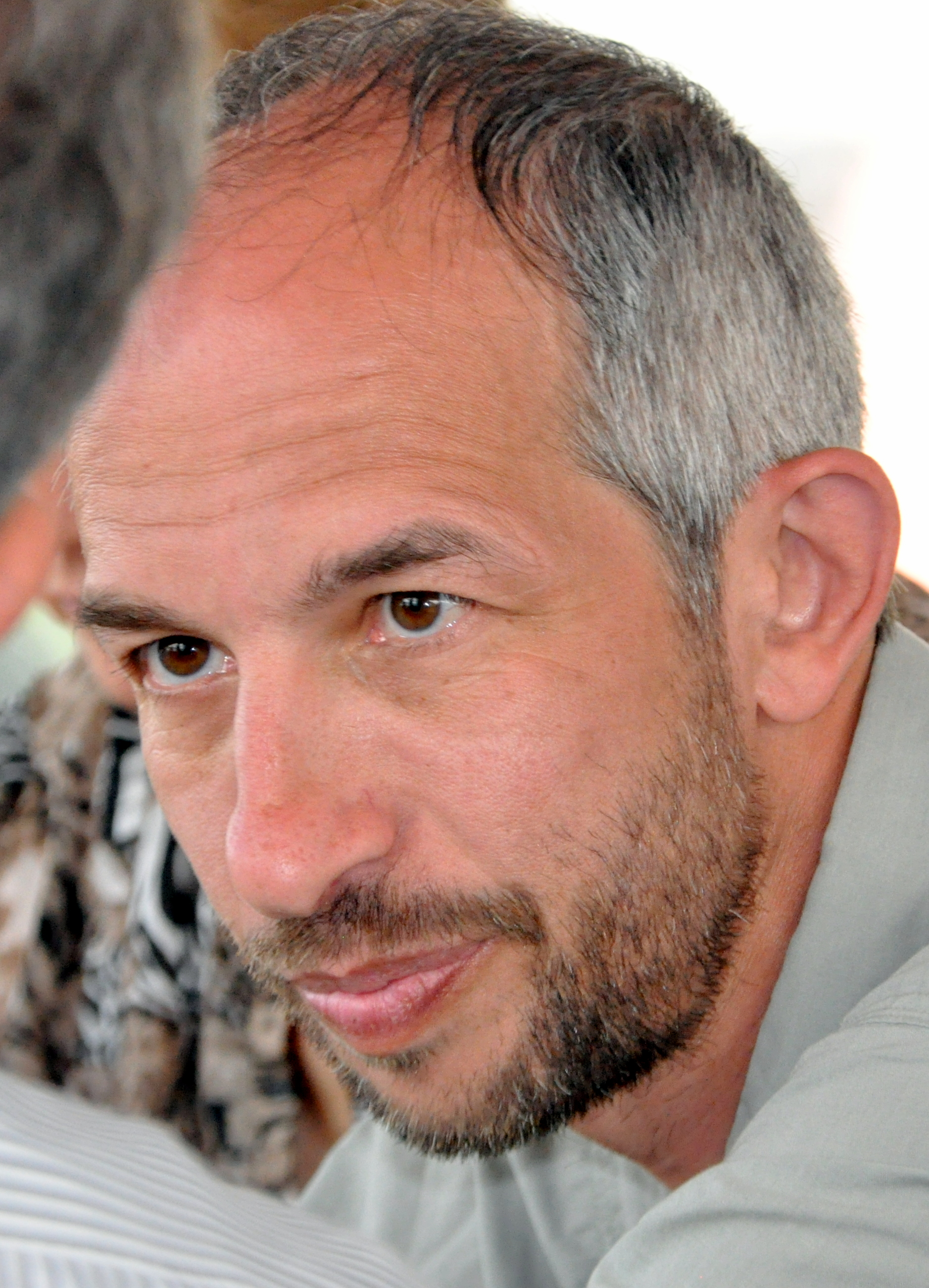
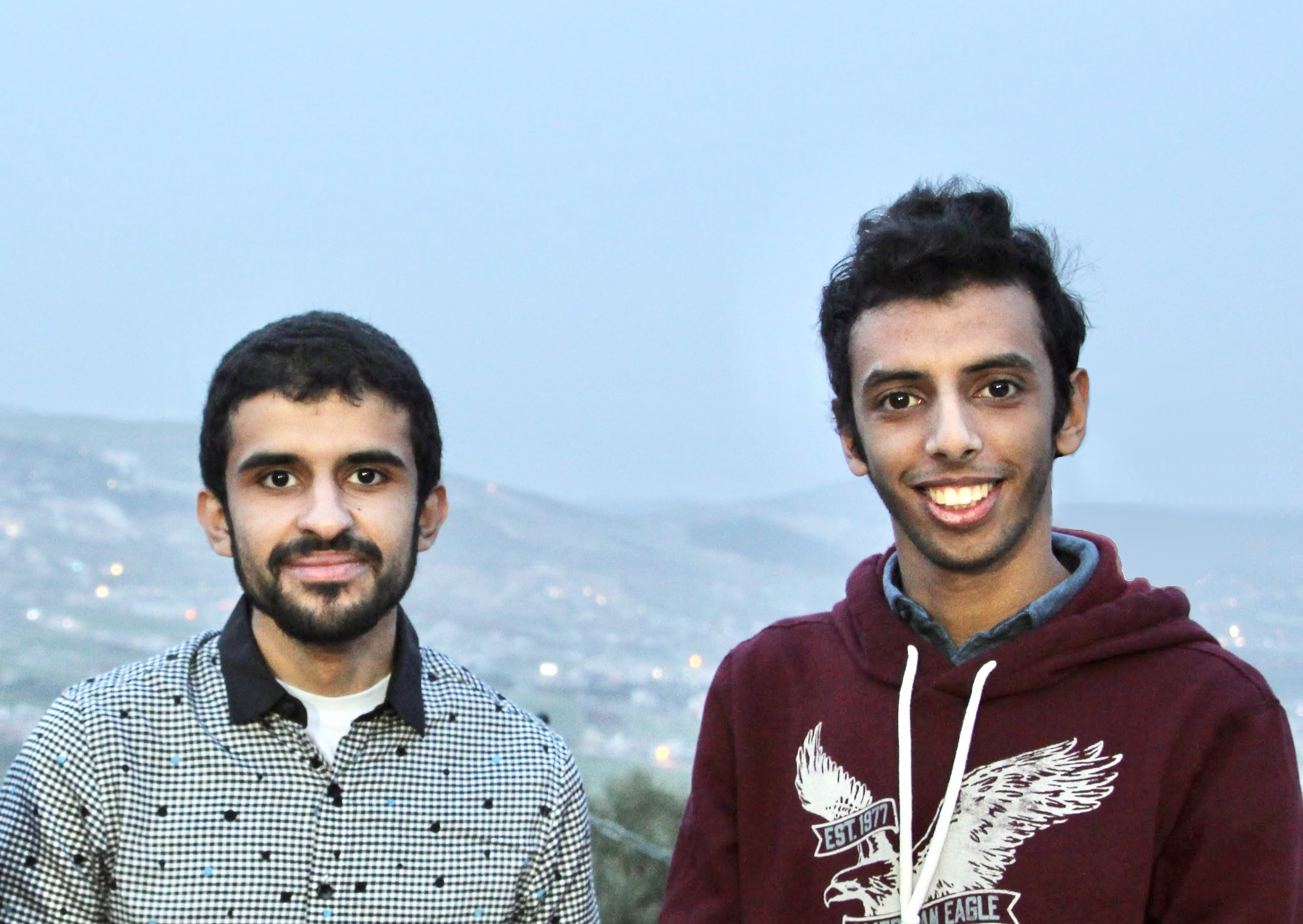
Clockwise from top-left: Bassel Khartabil Safadi (pictured in 2010), Mark Bernstein (pictured in 2013), Osama Khalid and Ziyad al-Sofiani (pictured in 2016)

There are eight known cases of Wikipedia editors being imprisoned for contributing to Wikipedia: five in Belarus, two in Saudi Arabia, and one in Syria. Bassel Khartabil, arrested in Syria in 2012, was executed in 2015.

== By country ==
=== Belarus ===
- Mark Bernstein (Марк Израйлевич Бернштейн), a Belarusian editor of the Russian Wikipedia, was detained on 11 March 2022 for violating the Russian 2022 war censorship laws by editing Wikipedia articles about the 2022 Russian invasion of Ukraine and sentenced to 15 days detention and three years of restricted freedom. He lives under restricted freedom, a parole-like sentence.
- Pavel Pernikaŭ (Павел Аляксандравіч Пернікаў), (Note: Also spelt Pavel Pernikov when transliterated from Павел Перников) a Belarusian editor of the Belarusian Wikipedia, was sentenced on 7 April 2022 to two years in a penal colony for online postings "discrediting the Republic of Belarus" including two edits to Wikipedia about political repression in Belarus. According to Viasna Human Rights Centre, Pernikov was released on 28 August 2023.
- Volha Sitnik (Вольга Сітнік), a Belarusian activist and administrator of the Belarusian Wikipedia, was detained on 17 April 2025 and later released. She was detained again on 7 May 2025. She has been imprisoned on unknown charges.
- Maksim Lepushenka (Максім Лепушэнка), a Belarusian editor, administrator, and bureaucrat of the Belarusian Wikipedia, was detained on 15 May 2025. Maksim was charged under Article 342 of the Criminal Code (organization and preparation of actions that grossly violate public order, or active participation in them). In August 2025, he was sentenced to restricted freedom.
- In November 2025, the Minsk prosecutor's office announced a two-year prison sentence and fine for a 37-year-old university lecturer for 25 edits made between 2020 and 2025 about the state symbols of the Republic of Belarus, presidential elections and referendums, and the activities of the authorities. Nasha Niva identified him as editor Kazimier Lachnovič, who had abruptly stopped editing Wikipedia in March of the same year. In March 2026, he was one of 250 political prisoners released as a result of negotiations between Alexander Lukashenko and the US Special Envoy for Belarus John Coale.

=== Saudi Arabia ===
- Osama Khalid (أسامة خالد), a Saudi Arabian former administrator of the Arabic Wikipedia, was sentenced to five years imprisonment in September 2020 for "swaying public opinion" and "violating public morals" by making edits "critical about the persecution of political activists in the country". Khalid's sentence was increased to 32 years in September 2022 as part of a campaign to lengthen the sentences of political detainees, according to Democracy for the Arab World Now and SMEX, a Lebanese non-governmental organization. Organizations which have advocated for his release from prison include the Electronic Frontier Foundation, Access Now, ALQST, Centre for Applied Human Rights at the University of York, Democracy for the Arab World Now, European Saudi Organisation for Human Rights, Gulf Centre for Human Rights, MENA Rights Group, Digital Citizenship, Digital Rights Foundation, Majal (organization), and Social Media Exchange. He is still incarcerated as of July 2026.
- Ziyad al-Sofiani (زياد السفياني), also a former administrator of the Arabic Wikipedia, was likewise charged with "swaying public opinion" and "violating public morals" by making edits "critical about the persecution of political activists in the country". He was sentenced in September 2020 to eight years in prison and was released in March 2025.

=== Syria ===
- Bassel Khartabil (باسل خرطبيل) was a contributor to a number of open-source projects including Wikipedia; his arrest in 2012 was likely connected to his online activity. He was executed at Adra Prison near Damascus in 2015. Several organizations, including the Wikimedia Foundation, established the Bassel Khartabil Free Culture Fellowship in his honor in 2017, for an initial period of three years. In August 2017, Khartabil's wife and friends reported they had seen a copy of official documents confirming he had been executed after his transfer from Adra Prison in 2015.

== See also ==
- Censorship of Wikipedia
- List of Wikipedia people
- Pierre-sur-Haute military radio station § Censorship on Wikipedia and unwanted attention
- Political prisoner
