= Censorship of Wikipedia =

Wikipedia has been censored by a number of governments, including, but not limited to, those of Belarus, China, Indonesia, Iran, Myanmar, North Korea, Pakistan, Russia, Saudi Arabia, Syria, Turkey, Uzbekistan, the United Kingdom and Venezuela.

In some instances, there is widespread Internet censorship in general that includes Wikipedia content. Other measures prevent the viewing of specific content deemed offensive. Blocks are one of the tools that have been used to censor Wikipedia as well as targeting editors directly and making edits to articles themselves.

Governments were able to block access to individual articles until June 2015, when Wikipedia transitioned to HTTPS, forcing censors to choose whether to block the entire site.

== Widespread censorship of Wikipedia ==
=== Types of censorship ===
==== Blocking all Wikipedia sites (in one or every language) ====
Some countries continue to block Wikipedia for long periods of time (e.g. China). Other countries use widespread blocks for shorter periods of time such as several months (e.g. Syria) to just hours (e.g. Pakistan).

==== Blocking specific articles ====
Prior to June 2015, when Wikipedia fully transitioned from HTTP to HTTPS, some countries blocked articles on sensitive topics, such as ideas espoused by a political opposition party, articles about current events (e.g. Russia), or ideas that were against the religious tradition of a regime (e.g. Iran). HTTPS made it much more difficult for governments to see which pages on Wikipedia a user was visiting. This forced censors to either unblock all articles or block the entire site.

==== Prosecuting editors ====
These prosecutions tend to focus on editors who publish information that a government wants to censor, leading to self-censorship.

==== Prosecuting readers ====
Few or no reports of government mass surveillance of Wikipedia usage are known since Wikipedia switched over to HTTPS in 2015. However, some governments and companies have installed mass surveillance spyware applications on user equipment, which may detect the usage of VPN software and record visited URLs.

=== By country ===
Examples of censorship of Wikipedia
Country	When	Currently blocking content	Previously blocked content	COI editing by the government	Editors have been prosecuted	Details
Belarus	Blocks on 11 March 2022 and 7 April 2022, imprisoned editor since 2022				Yes	
China	2004, 2005–2008, 2015–present (https), April 2019–present (all)	All	Yes	Yes	Yes	All versions
Iran	2013–2015 (partial)		Yes	Suspected		Hundreds of articles (2013–2015)
Myanmar	15 February 2021 – present	All	Yes			All versions
North Korea		All	Yes	Yes	Yes	World Wide Web is physically disconnected
Pakistan	31 March 2006, several days in May 2010, 3 February 2023 – 6 February 2023		Yes			Some, all versions
Russia	2010s–present		Yes	Yes	Yes	Select pages
Saudi Arabia	2000s–present		Yes	Yes	Yes	Select pages
Syria	30 April 2008 – 13 February 2009 (block), 2012–2015 (imprisonment and execution of an editor)		Yes		Yes	Arabic
Tunisia	23–27 November 2006		Yes			All versions
Turkey	2014–2015 (partial), April 2017–January 2020 (full)		Yes			All versions
Uzbekistan	2007, 2008, 2012		Yes			All (2007, 2008) Uzbek (2012)
Venezuela	12–18 January 2019		Yes			All versions

==== Belarus ====
On 11 March 2022, Belarusian political police GUBOPiK arrested and detained Mark Bernstein, an editor of the Russian Wikipedia from Minsk, who was editing the Wikipedia article about the Russian invasion of Ukraine, accusing him of the "spread of anti-Russian materials" and of violating Russian "fake news" laws.

On 7 April 2022, a court in Brest sentenced Wikipedia user Pavel Pernikaŭ to two years of prison for three edits of Russian and Belarusian Wikipedia. He was found guilty of "discrediting the Republic of Belarus" (article 369-1 of the Criminal Code of Belarus).

==== China ====
Access to Wikipedia has varied over the years with the Chinese language version being controlled more tightly than other versions. As of April 2019, all versions of Wikipedia are blocked in mainland China under the Great Firewall.

The Chinese Wikipedia was launched in May 2001. Wikipedia received positive coverage in China's state press in early 2004 but was blocked on 3 June 2004, ahead of the 15th anniversary of the 1989 Tiananmen Square protests and massacre. Proposals to practice self-censorship in a bid to restore the site were rejected by the Chinese Wikipedia community. However, a story by the International Herald Tribune comparing entries on the Chinese and English Wikipedias on topics such as Mao Zedong and Taiwan concluded that the Chinese entries were "watered down and sanitized" of political controversy. On 22 June 2004, access to Wikipedia was restored without explanation. Wikipedia was blocked again for unknown reasons in September, but only for four days. Wikipedia was again blocked in China in October 2005. Wikipedia users Shi Zhao and Cui Wei wrote letters to technicians and authorities in an attempt to convince them to unblock the website. Part of the letter read, "By blocking Wikipedia, we lose a chance to present China's voice to the world, allowing evil cults, Taiwan independence forces and others ... to present a distorted image of China."

In October 2006, The New York Times reported that the English Wikipedia was unblocked in China, although the Chinese Wikipedia remained blocked. New media researcher Andrew Lih blogged that he could not read the English-language article on the Tiananmen Square protests of 1989 in China. Lih said that "There is no monolithically operating Great Firewall", noting that for users of various internet service providers in different locations in China—China Netcom in Beijing, China Telecom in Shanghai, and various providers in Anhui—the Chinese Wikipedia was blocked only in Anhui. Advocacy organization Reporters Without Borders praised Wikipedia's leaders for not self-censoring.

On 10 November 2006, Lih reported that the Chinese Wikipedia appeared to have been fully unblocked. Lih confirmed the full unblocking several days later and offered a partial analysis of the effects based on the rate of new account creation on the Chinese Wikipedia. Before the unblocking, 300–400 new accounts were created daily. In the four days after the unblocking, the rate of new registrations more than tripled to over 1,200 daily, making it the second fastest growing Wikipedia after the English version. Similarly, there were 75% more articles created in the week ending on 13 November than during the week before. On the same weekend that the Chinese Wikipedia passed the 100,000 article mark, Lih predicted that the second 100,000 would come quickly but that the existing body of Chinese Wikipedia users would have their hands full teaching the new users basic Wikipedia policies and norms.

On 16 November 2006, the Reuters news agency reported the main page of the Chinese Wikipedia could be displayed but not pages on some taboo political subjects, such as "4 June, [1989 protests]". However, subsequent reports suggested that both the Chinese and English versions had been reblocked the next day on 17 November. On 15 June 2007, access to non-political articles on the English Wikipedia was restored. On 6 September 2007, IDG News reported that the English Wikipedia was blocked again. On 2 April 2008, The Register reported that the blocks on the English and Chinese Wikipedias were lifted. This was confirmed by the BBC and came within the context of foreign journalists arriving in Beijing to report on the 2008 Summer Olympics and the International Olympic Committee's request for press freedom during the games. In September 2008, Jimmy Wales had a meeting with Cai Mingzhao, Vice Director of China's State Council Information Office. While no agreements were made, Wales believed that a channel of communication had been opened between Wikipedia's community and the government of China.

According to a report published in the American Economic Review in 2011, the blocking of the Chinese Wikipedia not only reduced the group size of its users but also decreased the unblocked users' contributions by 42.8% on average.

In 2012, both the Chinese and English Wikipedias were accessible in China except for political articles. If a Chinese IP attempted to access or search for a "sensitive" article, the IP would be blocked from visiting Wikipedia for between several minutes to up to an hour.

Chinese authorities started blocking access to the secure (HTTPS) version of the site on 31 May 2013. Although the non-secure (HTTP) version was still available, it was vulnerable to keyword filtering allowing individual articles to be selectively blocked. GreatFire urged Wikipedia and users to circumvent the block by accessing other IP addresses owned by Wikipedia with HTTPS. In 2013, after Jimmy Wales stated that Wikipedia will not tolerate "5 seconds" of censorship, Shen Yi, an Internet researcher at Fudan University in Shanghai said that while "Wikipedia is tough against the Chinese government, it may not necessarily be so grand when faced with US government or European justice systems' requirements to modify or delete articles or disclose information". Meanwhile, Huang, an administrator of Chinese Wikipedia, told Radio Free Asia that he had already been exit banned (by the government) for 4 years since 2009 without a clear reason provided.

According to GreatFire, both the encrypted and unencrypted Chinese Wikipedia were blocked on 19 May 2015.

Since June 2015, all Wikipedias redirect HTTP requests to the corresponding HTTPS addresses, thereby making encryption mandatory for all users and rendering the site inaccessible in China. As a result, Chinese censors cannot see which specific pages an individual is viewing and therefore cannot block a specific subset of pages (such as Ai Weiwei, Liu Xiaobo or Tiananmen Square) as they did previously.

Wales said he would fly to China to lobby the Chinese government to unlock the site within two weeks at the Leadership Energy Summit Asia 2015 in Kuala Lumpur on 2 December 2015. The government of China completely blocked all language versions of the site again on 4 December. A large number of Chinese internet users complained about the block on social networks, although most of the complaints were deleted after a short period. However, it became possible to visit Wikipedia in other languages on 6 December in China again.

Wales met Lu Wei, the director of Cyberspace Administration of China on 17 December 2015 during the World Internet Conference held in Wuzhen, Zhejiang. Wales said that this was the first time they met and there was no consensus on specific issues but that the purpose of the meeting was for the two to "meet and know each other". Wales told Lu Wei how Wikipedia and Wikimedia work in the world and expressed hopes to meet Lu Wei and the Cyberspace Administration of China regularly in the future. When a reporter asked if he would order Wikipedia to hide some information to maintain stable operations in China, he responded "Never." Still, Wales' own words have been censored; he said that the improvements in machine translation might make it "no longer possible" for authorities to control flows of information in the future during a panel discussion. However, in the official translation, his statement was that such improvements will help governments to better analyze online communications.

On 23 April 2019, all versions of Wikipedia were blocked in China.

On 23 September 2020, Wikimedia's application for the status as an official observer at the World Intellectual Property Organization was rejected by the Chinese government because China's representative claimed that they had "spotted a large amount of content and disinformation in violation of [the] One China principle" on webpages affiliated with Wikimedia, and Wikimedia's Taiwan branch has been "carrying out political activities ... which could undermine the state's sovereignty and territorial integrity".

On 24 October 2020, a Chinese citizen was penalized by the local police in Zhoushan, Zhejiang, for "illegally visiting Wikipedia".

On 5 October 2021, the Chinese government rejected the Wikimedia Foundation's bid for observer status at the World Intellectual Property Organization again for the same reason as in 2020.

Despite being censored in mainland China, and as VPNs are normally not allowed to edit Wikipedia, Wikipedia administrators from China have permitted IP block exemptions for a select number of mainland users. Such users are recruited to change the editorial content on Wikipedia in support of the Chinese government's viewpoint and/or to support the election of pro-Beijing administrators on Wikipedia, with the aim of gaining control of Wikipedia. Academics suggested that "China urgently needs to encourage and train Chinese netizens to become Wikipedia platform opinion leaders and administrators ... [who] can adhere to socialist values and form some core editorial teams." A group known as Wikimedians of Mainland China (WMC or WMCUG) has clashed with Wikipedia editors from Taiwan, not only over Wikipedia's content, but also making death threats made against Taiwan's community of Wikipedians. One Taiwanese editor suggested that it was not just patriotic mainlanders, but a "larger structural coordinated strategy the government has to manipulate these platforms" beside Wikipedia, such as Twitter and Facebook.

The WMC has threatened to report Wikipedia editors to Hong Kong's national security police hotline over the disputed article "2019–2020 Hong Kong protests" characterized by edit warring. A Hong Kong-based editor, who remains anonymous because of fears of intimidation, noted that "Pro-Beijing people often remove content that is sympathetic to protests, such as tear gas being fired and images of barricades. They also add their own content". Acknowledging that "edit wars" happen on both sides, the anonymous editor stated that "Pro-democracy editors tend to add content to shift the balance or the tone of the article, but in my experience, the pro-Beijing editors are a lot more aggressive in churning out disinformation. It's now unfixable without external interference. Someone is trying to rewrite history."

On 13 September 2021, the Wikimedia Foundation banned seven Wikipedia users and removed administrator privileges from twelve users who were members of the WMC. Maggie Dennis, the foundation's vice president of community resilience and sustainability, said that there had been a year-long investigation into "infiltration concerns" that threatened the "very foundations of Wikipedia". Dennis observed that the infiltrators had tried to promote "the aims of China, as interpreted through whatever filters they may bring to bear". Suggesting possible links to the Chinese Communist Party, Dennis said "We needed to act based on credible information that some members (not all) of that group [WMC] have harassed, intimidated, and threatened other members of our community, including in some cases physically harming others, in order to secure their own power and subvert the collaborative nature of our projects".

==== India ====
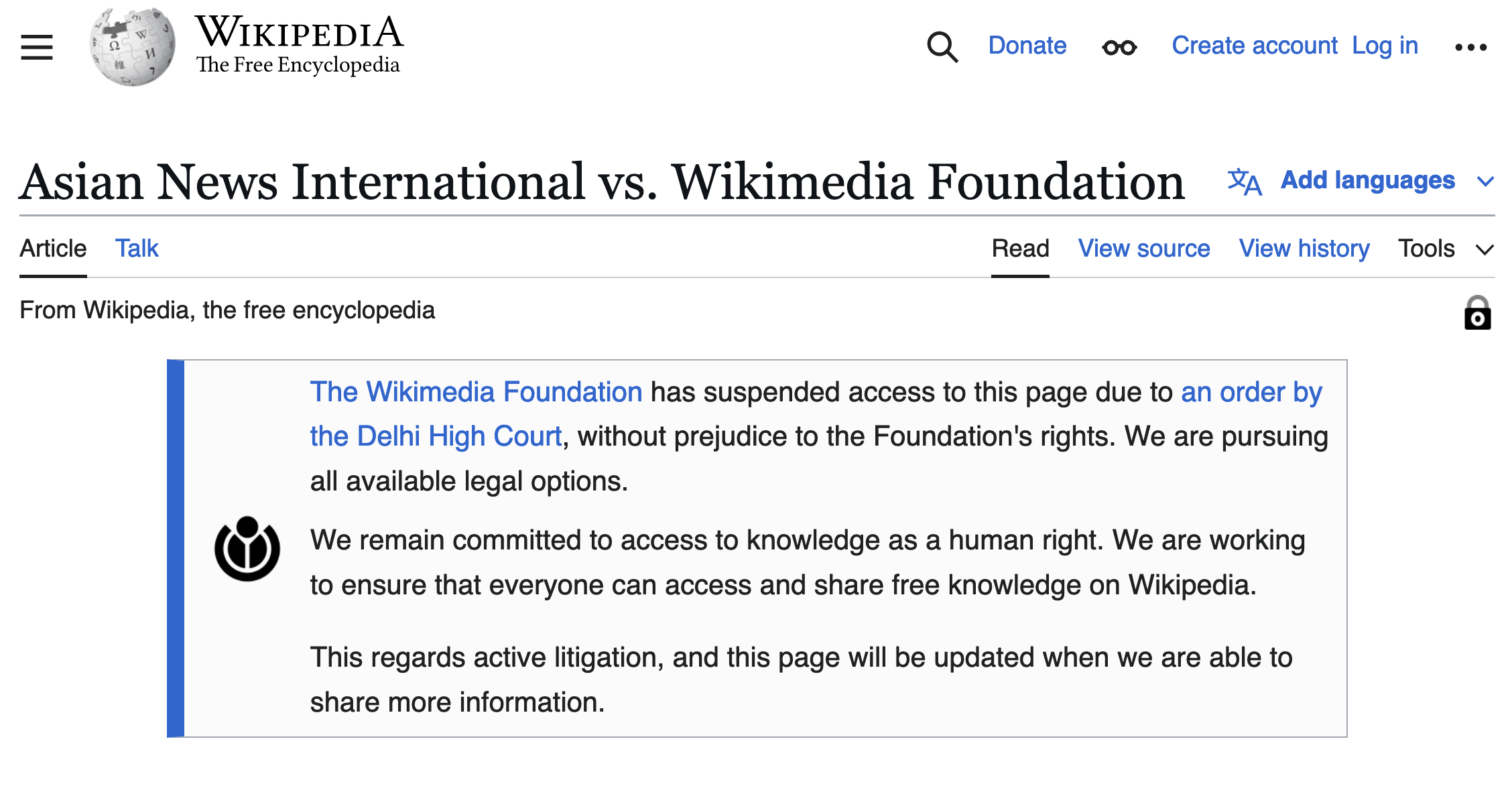
Message displayed to users on the English Wikipedia when access to the article was suspended

In July 2024, Asian News International sued Wikimedia to uncover the identity of editors who characterized it on Wikipedia as being a propaganda tool for the Indian government, alleging the editors had defamed the news agency. The Delhi High Court threatened to block Wikipedia in India if the names of editors were not turned over.

On 21 October 2024, the Wikimedia Foundation suspended access to the article for the lawsuit itself—due to an order from the court stating that the article violated the sub judice principle. This is believed to be the first time an English Wikipedia page had been taken down after a court order.

On 17 March 2025, the Supreme Court of India questioned the Delhi High Court's order asking Wikipedia to remove details of the lawsuit. It also asked why the High Court was being "so touchy" about the issue. It further noted that courts should not demand content removal merely because it is critical of them. Supreme Court Justices Abhay S. Oka and Ujjal Bhuyan noted that the case would have broad implications for press freedom. "This concerns press freedom. If it is Wikipedia today, it could be someone else tomorrow."

The Delhi High Court's order that the article be taken down was overturned on appeal to the Supreme Court of India. The Court said that in a liberal democracy, the judiciary and the media must support each other, and it is not the duty of the court to tell the media to delete or take down content.

==== Indonesia ====
On 16 April 2026, the Indonesian Ministry of Communication and Digital Affairs announced that it would block the entirety of Wikipedia and all other Wikimedia Foundation subsidiaries within 7 business days, citing that the Wikimedia Foundation did not register as an "Electronic System Provider" (Penyelenggara Sistem Elektronik) in the country. The ministry previously blocked Wikimedia's authentication domain (auth.wikimedia.org) and Wikimedia Commons under the same law. The block was later cancelled in favour of Wikimedia registering as an ESP.

==== Iran ====
In a November 2013 report published by the Center for Global Communication Studies of the University of Pennsylvania, researchers Collin Anderson and Nima Nazeri scanned 800,000 Persian-language Wikipedia articles and found that the Iranian government blocks 963 of these pages. According to the authors, "Censors repeatedly targeted Wikipedia pages about government rivals, minority religious beliefs, and criticisms of the state, officials, and the police. Just under half of the blocked Wiki-pages are biographies, including pages about individuals the authorities have allegedly detained or killed." Anderson said that Persian Wikipedia, as a microcosm of the Iranian internet, is a "useful place to uncover the types of online content forbidden and an excellent template to identify keyword blocking themes and filtering rules that apply across the greater internet." In May 2014, according to Mashable, the Iranian government blocked at least two pages of the Persian Wikipedia. According to the Associated Press, during the COVID-19 pandemic, access to Wikipedia was disrupted in Iranian networks. In January 2024, The Times ran a story on widespread anonymous edits primarily on Persian Wikipedia that followed regime talking points.

==== Myanmar ====
On 21 February 2021, following the military coup d'état, Myanmar blocked Wikipedia in all languages as part of the junta's censorship.

==== Pakistan ====
For seven hours on 31 March 2006, the entire domain of wikipedia.org was blocked in Pakistan because one article contained information pertaining to the controversial cartoons of Muhammad.

The English version of Wikipedia was blocked in Pakistan for several days in May 2010 during the controversy surrounding Everybody Draw Mohammed Day.

On 1 February 2023, the Pakistan Telecommunication Authority (PTA) degraded Wikipedia services for 48 hours due to what it said was Wikipedia's failure to remove sacrilegious content. The PTA stated that Wikipedia services would be blocked if the content remained available. On 3 February, Pakistani authorities blocked access to Wikipedia. On 6 February 2023, the Pakistani prime minister, Shehbaz Sharif, ordered the PTA to immediately remove the ban on Wikipedia. The reason for lifting the ban was that "Wikipedia was a useful site/portal which supported the dissemination of knowledge and information for the general public, students and the academia". As of 15 June 2025, most parts of Wikipedia are accessible, with Wikimedia Commons currently inaccessible.

==== Russia ====
Since the early 2010s, Russian Wikipedia and its editors have experienced numerous and increasing threats of nationwide blocks and country-wide enforcement of blacklisting by the Russian government, as well as several attempts to censor pages, spread propaganda, and disinformation, more recently during the 2014 Russo-Ukrainian war in the Donbas region and the current Russian invasion of Ukraine since 2022.

On 5 April 2013, the Federal Service for Supervision of Communications, Information Technology and Mass Media (better known as Roskomnadzor) confirmed that Wikipedia was blacklisted, stating that it had been "for a long time. I don't know why it's only now that they've woken up". The same day, Roskomnadzor ordered the Russian Wikipedia to remove the article "Курение каннабиса" ("Cannabis smoking"), or else they would block the entirety of Wikipedia in Russia. Internet censorship became more common after a new law was passed around November 2013, allowing the government to block content deemed illegal or harmful to children.

On 18 August 2015, Roskomnadzor instructed Russian Wikipedia administrators to remove the article "Чарас (наркотическое вещество)" ("Charas (narcotic substance)"), about charas, a type of cannabis, by 21 August 2015 or else they would block Wikipedia (which they executed to a limited extent on 25 August). The article was found by a Russian provincial court to contain a detailed description of how to make a narcotic, deeming it prohibited information. Roskomnadzor explained that "insofar as Wikipedia has decided to function on the basis of https, which doesn't allow restricting to individual pages on its site, the entire website would be blocked" if they did not comply. In response to the impending block, the director of NP Wikimedia RU Vladimir Medeyko argued that the article had already been promptly and adequately rewritten to remove the controversial points and satisfy the order, using scientific articles and UN documents, and also attempted to preserve the text by transferring it to the article "Гашиш" ("Hashish"). Wikipedia representatives said if access was restricted, they would file a complaint to the prosecutor's office against Roskomnadzor and appeal the decision. Anticipating the ban, the Russian Wikipedia published a resource titled "What to do if Wikipedia was blocked". On 24 August, Roskomnadzor instructed Russian internet providers to block Wikipedia. By the night of 25 August, around 10–20% of Russian users had issues with accessing Wikipedia with access varying between regions and devices used. Also on the same date, the charas article was removed from the registry of banned sites. Roskomnadzor explained that they had "been informed by the Federal Drug Control Service that sufficient edits were made that met the conditions of court order".

In February and March 2022, in the first week following the Russian invasion of Ukraine and breakout of the Russo-Ukrainian War, Russian Wikipedia editors warned their readers and fellow editors of several, reiterated attempts by the Putin-led Russian government of political censorship, Internet propaganda, disinformation attacks, and disruptive editing towards an article listing of Russian military casualties as well as Ukrainian civilians and children due to the ongoing war. On 1 March 2022, Roskomnadzor threatened to block access to the Russian Wikipedia in Russia over the Russian-language article ru:Вторжение России на Украину (2022) ("Russian invasion of Ukraine (2022)"). Roskomnadzor claimed that the article contains "illegally distributed information", including "reports about numerous casualties among service personnel of the Russian Federation and also the civilian population of Ukraine, including children".

On 31 March 2022, Roskomnadzor threatened to fine Wikipedia up to 4 million rubles (about $49,000) if it did not delete information about the 2022 Russian invasion of Ukraine that is "misinforming" Russians.

In April–May 2022, the Russian authorities put several Wikipedia articles on their list of forbidden sites. The list included the articles 2022 Russian invasion of Ukraine, Ruscism, several articles in Russian Wikipedia devoted to the military action and war crimes during the Russian invasion of Ukraine, and two sections of the Russian article about Vladimir Putin.

On 20 July 2022, due to the refusal of Wikipedia to remove the articles about the Russian-Ukrainian war, Roskomnadzor ordered search engines to mark Wikipedia as a violator of Russian laws.

On 1 November 2022, the Wikimedia Foundation was fined 2 million rubles by a Russian court for not deleting two articles on Russian Wikipedia. On 13 April 2023, the Wikimedia Foundation was again fined by a Russian court.

In December 2023, Stanislav Kozlovsky, Wikimedia Russia's director, was listed as a "foreign agent" by the Justice Ministry of Russia. Moscow University, where he taught, expelled him. Wikimedia Russia was forced to disband.

In February 2024, Russian presidential aide Vladimir Medinsky suggested that 99% of the articles on Wikipedia were "absolutely neutral and even interesting", but 1% of the articles were "enemy slander". He also encouraged the idea of a native Russian online encyclopedia alternative based on the content of Wikipedia.

==== Saudi Arabia ====
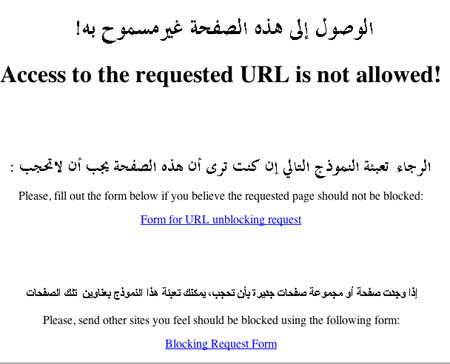
Example of Saudi Arabian ISP blocking a website

On 11 July 2006, the Saudi government blocked access to Wikipedia and Google Translate for what it said was sexual and politically sensitive content. Google Translate was being used to bypass the filters on the blocked sites by translating them. Though Wikipedia is not blocked currently, specific pages on Wikipedia were reported to be censored by Saudi Arabia in 2011, such as one page discussing the theory of evolution. Encrypted connections over HTTPS starting in 2015 made censorship more difficult for these pages and as of 2017 there is no evidence that individual pages are still being blocked.

In September 2020, two Wikipedia volunteer administrators were arrested on the same day: Osama Khalid was sentenced to 32 years in prison while Ziyad al-Sofiani was sentenced to eight years, according to Smex, a Lebanese NGO to advance self-regulating information societies in the Arab-speaking world, and Democracy for the Arab World Now. A subsequent investigation by the Wikimedia Foundation identified 16 users who seemed to routinely engage in conflict-of-interest editing—reportedly including spying for the Saudi government.

==== Ba'athist Syria ====
Access to the Arabic Wikipedia was blocked in Syria in 2008, although other language editions remained accessible.

Bassel Khartabil (Arabic: باسل خرطبيل) was a contributor to a number of open-source projects including Wikipedia; his arrest in 2012 was likely connected to his online activity. He was executed at Adra Prison near Damascus in 2015. Several organizations, including the Wikimedia Foundation, established the Bassel Khartabil Free Culture Fellowship in his honor in 2017, for an initial period of three years.

==== Tunisia ====
The Wikipedia website was inaccessible from Tunisia between 23 and 27 November 2006.

==== Turkey ====
In the early hours of 29 April 2017, monitoring group Turkey Blocks identified loss of access to all language editions of Wikipedia throughout Turkey. The block came after Turkish authorities demanded Wikipedia "remove content by writers supporting terror and of linking Turkey to terror groups", a demand for which the government stated that it did not receive a satisfactory response.

Starting on 17 November 2014, Turkey had only censored specific articles on Turkish Wikipedia, such as "2015 Türkiye genel seçim anketleri" ("2015 Turkey general election polls") and articles related to reproductive organs. There was no court decision for this censorship. One Turkish internet provider, TTNET, speculated that Wikipedia was broken. Katherine Maher from the Wikimedia Foundation said this did not reflect the truth.

In December 2019, the Constitutional Court of Turkey ruled that the two and a half-year block was unconstitutional. On 15 January 2020, it was reported to the Wikimedia Foundation that access to the website was being restored.

==== Uzbekistan ====
The entirety of Wikipedia was briefly blocked twice in Uzbekistan, in 2007 and 2008. Blocking of the Uzbek Wikipedia caught the attention of the international press in late February 2012. Internet users in Uzbekistan trying to access Uzbek-language pages were redirected to MSN. Users in Uzbekistan could easily open Wikipedia articles in other languages. Only Uzbek-language articles were blocked.

==== Venezuela ====
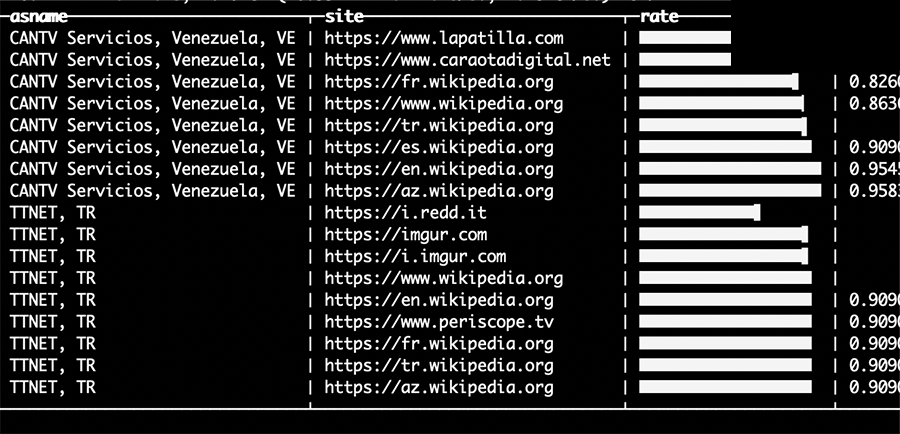
Netblocks report of the developing incident of blocking of Wikipedia in Venezuela by CANTV as of 12 January 2019

In the evening of 12 January 2019, the NetBlocks internet observatory collected technical evidence of the blocking of all editions of Wikipedia in Venezuela. The restrictions were implemented by CANTV, the largest telecommunications provider in the country. NetBlocks identified a major network disruption affecting telecommunications infrastructure, which coincided with other restrictions affecting Venezuelans' ability to communicate and access information during the previous 24 hours. The collected data also showed that a number of local websites had been recently restricted, indicating that recent political instability could be the underlying cause for what may be a tightening regime of internet control.

== Single-article disputes ==
=== Types of disputes ===
Individual articles can be disputed or blocked by a country for allegedly violating a range of laws from revealing the location of a secret military installation (see France below), defamation or misinformation laws (see Germany below), or a judgment that an image in an article was pornographic (see UK below).

=== Examples by country ===
==== Australia ====
In 2018, County Court of Victoria chief judge Peter Kidd placed a non-publication order on all of the evidence and the verdict in a trial of Australian Cardinal George Pell. The suppression order applied "in all Australian states and territories" and "on any website or other electronic or broadcast format accessible within Australia". This included Wikipedia, which was cited but not charged.

==== France ====
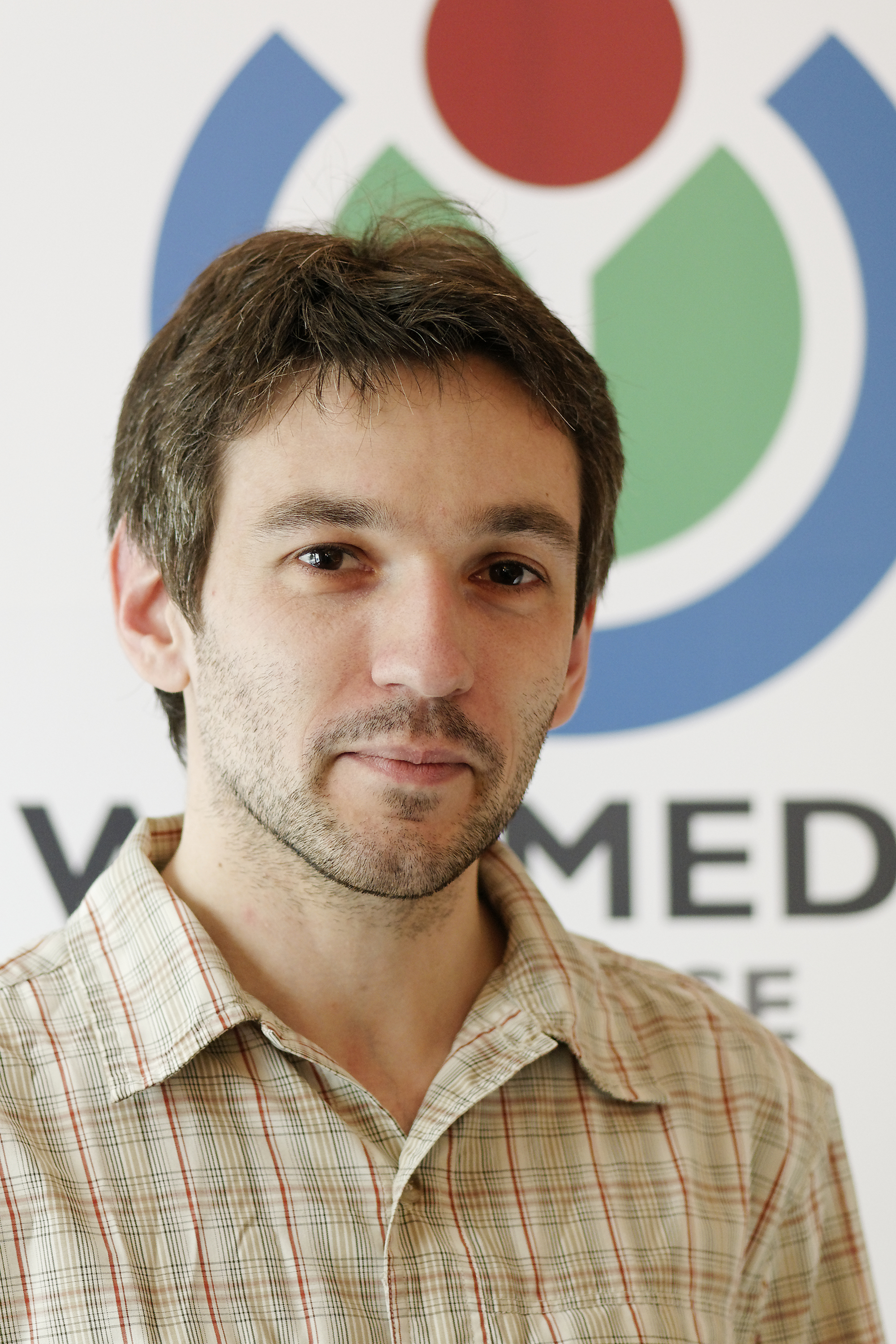
Rémi Mathis, an administrator on the French Wikipedia, was ordered by the French interior intelligence agency to delete an article.

In April 2013, a Wikipedia article describing the Pierre-sur-Haute military radio station attracted attention from the French interior intelligence agency DCRI. The agency attempted to have the article about the facility removed from the French Wikipedia. The DCRI pressured Rémi Mathis, a volunteer administrator of the French Wikipedia and resident of France, into deleting the article. The Wikimedia Foundation asked the DCRI which parts of the article were causing a problem, noting that the article closely reflected information in a 2004 documentary made by Télévision Loire 7, a French local television station, which is freely available online. The DCRI refused to give these details, and repeated its demand for deletion of the article. According to a statement issued by Wikimédia France on 6 April 2013:

The DCRI summoned a Wikipedia volunteer in their offices on April 4th [2013]. This volunteer, which was one of those having access to the tools that allow the deletion of pages, was forced to delete the article while in the DCRI offices, on the understanding that he would have been held in custody and prosecuted if he did not comply. Under pressure, he had no other choice than to delete the article, despite explaining to the DCRI this is not how Wikipedia works. He warned the other sysops that trying to undelete the article would engage their responsibility before the law. This volunteer had no link with that article, having never edited it and not even knowing of its existence before entering the DCRI offices. He was chosen and summoned because he was easily identifiable, given his regular promotional actions of Wikipedia and Wikimedia projects in France.

— Wikimédia France

Later, the article was restored by another Wikipedia contributor who lived outside France, in Switzerland. As a result of the controversy, the article became the most read page on the French Wikipedia, with over 120,000 page views during the weekend of 6–7 April 2013. The French newspaper 20 minutes, Ars Technica, and a posting on Slashdot, noted it as an example of the Streisand effect in action. The French Ministry of the Interior told Agence France-Presse (AFP) that it did not wish to comment on the incident.

According to a judicial source quoted in an AFP story on 8 April, the article's deletion "was performed as part of a preliminary inquiry" led by the "anti-terrorist section of the Paris prosecutor's office" on the grounds that the French language Wikipedia article compromised "classified material related to the chain of transmission for nuclear launch orders".

Following the incident, Télévision Loire 7 said that it expected that the DCRI would request that it take down the original 2004 report on which the Wikipedia article was based, though it had been filmed and broadcast with the full cooperation of the French armed forces. The National Union of Police Commissioners suggested that the next step would be for the judiciary to order French Internet service providers to block access to the Wikipedia article. However, the France-based NGO Reporters Without Borders criticised the DCRI's actions as "a bad precedent". The organisation's spokesperson told Le Point that, "if the institution considers that secret defence information has been released, it has every opportunity to be recognised by the courts in arguing and clarifying its application. It is then up to the judge, the protector of fundamental freedoms, to assess the reality and extent of military secrecy." The spokesperson noted that the information contained in the article had come from a documentary that had previously been filmed and distributed with the cooperation of the French Army, and that the hosts and intermediaries should not be held responsible.

==== Germany ====
In one case, Wikipedia.de (an Internet domain run by Wikimedia Deutschland) was prohibited from pointing to the actual Wikipedia content. The court order was a temporary injunction in a case filed by politician Lutz Heilmann over claims regarding his past involvement with the former German Democratic Republic's intelligence service Stasi. Heilmann withdrew the injunction after 2 days.

==== India ====
On 21 October 2024, Wikimedia Foundation blocked access to the article Asian News International v. Wikimedia Foundation in the English Wikipedia as part of a defamation lawsuit brought by Asian News International regarding the firm's description in the article, following a warning by the Delhi High Court that the article may violate sub judice rules. However, on 9 May 2025, the order was overturned by the Supreme Court of India and the article was restored.

==== Portugal ====
Following an August 2025 court order by the Portuguese Supreme Court of Justice, the English and Portuguese Wikipedia articles for businessman Caesar DePaço were partially censored to comply with said order.

==== United Kingdom ====
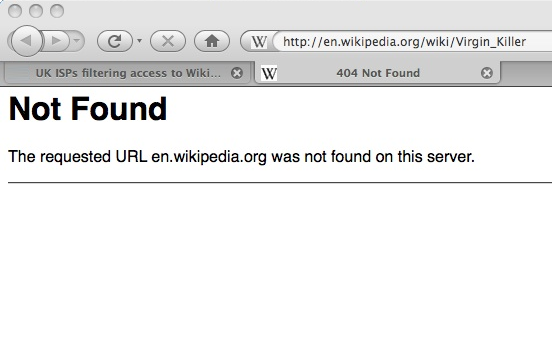
Screen capture of the blocked article Virgin Killer

In December 2008, the Internet Watch Foundation, a UK-based non-government organization, added the Wikipedia article Virgin Killer to its internet blacklist due to the album cover's image and the illegality of child pornography in that country; the image had been assessed by IWF as being the lowest level of legal concern: "erotic posing with no sexual activity". As a result, people using many major UK ISPs were blocked from viewing the entire article by the Cleanfeed system, and a large part of the UK was blocked from editing Wikipedia owing to the means used by the IWF to block the image. Following discussion, representations by the Wikimedia Foundation, and public complaints, the IWF reversed their decision three days later, and confirmed that in future they would not block copies of the same image that were hosted overseas.

== State-ordered disablement of Wikimedia features ==
=== Indonesia ===
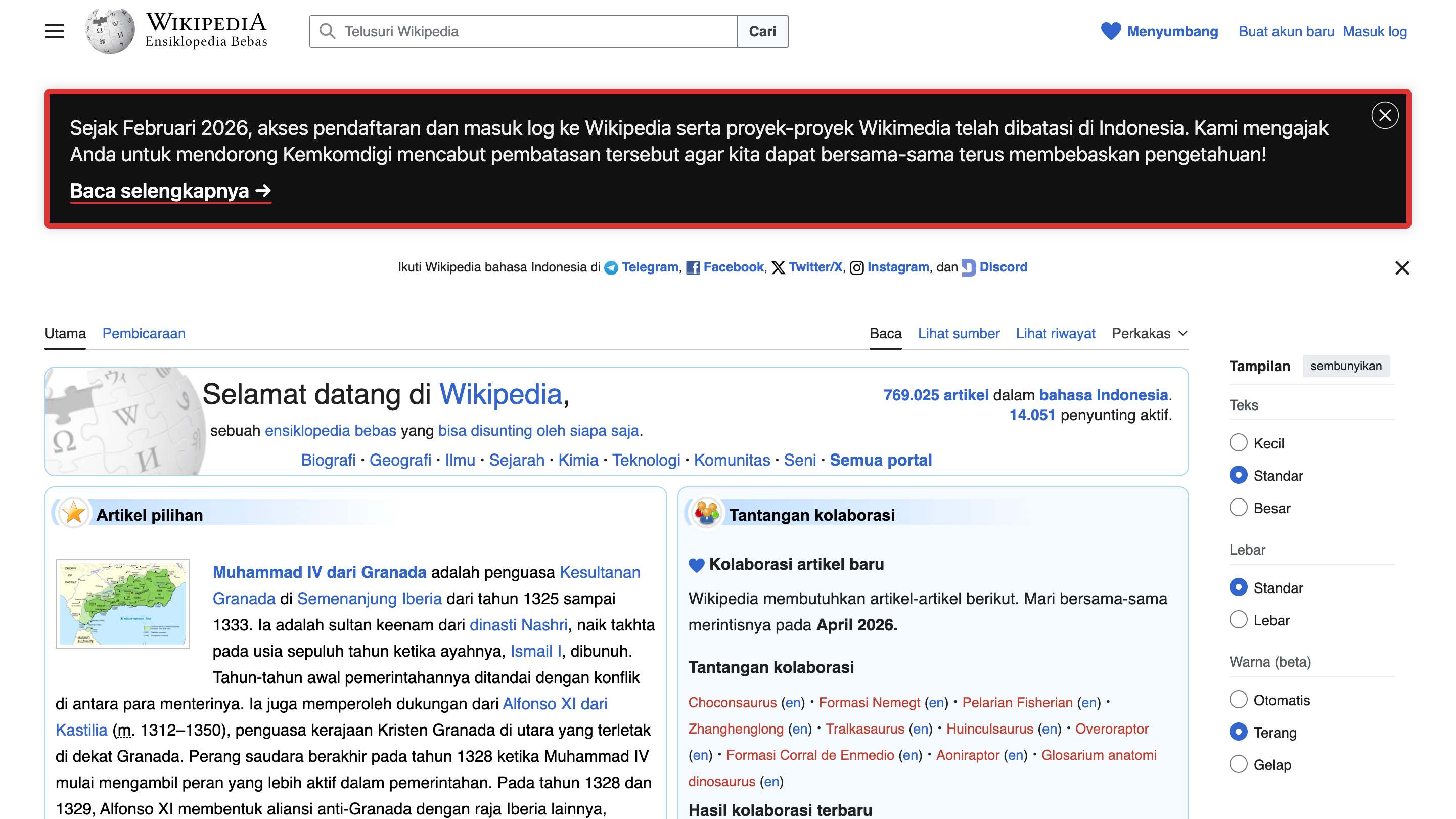
Banner on Indonesian Wikipedia, 14 April 2026

On 25 February 2026, the country's Ministry of Communication and Digital Affairs unilaterally blocked access to Wikimedia's authentication domain (auth.wikimedia.org), labelling the foundation's non-compliance of registering themselves as an "Electronic System Provider" (Penyelenggara Sistem Elektronik) as the reason. This prevented users from logging in or creating accounts on all Wikimedia projects, including Wikipedia. Rights groups called for the restoration of normal access. The block was later lifted on 30 April 2026 after Wikimedia registered themselves as an ESP.

On 25 March 2026, Wikimedia Commons was blocked in Indonesia as well; it has since been unblocked.

== See also ==
- Conflict-of-interest editing on Wikipedia
- Criticism of Wikipedia § Sexual content
- Deletionism and inclusionism in Wikipedia
- Ideological bias on Wikipedia
- Internet censorship § Wikipedia
- List of people imprisoned for editing Wikipedia
- SLAPP
- Transnational repression
- Asian News International vs. Wikimedia Foundation
- Freedom of speech by country
