= Osama Khalid =

Saudi political prisoner (born 1994)

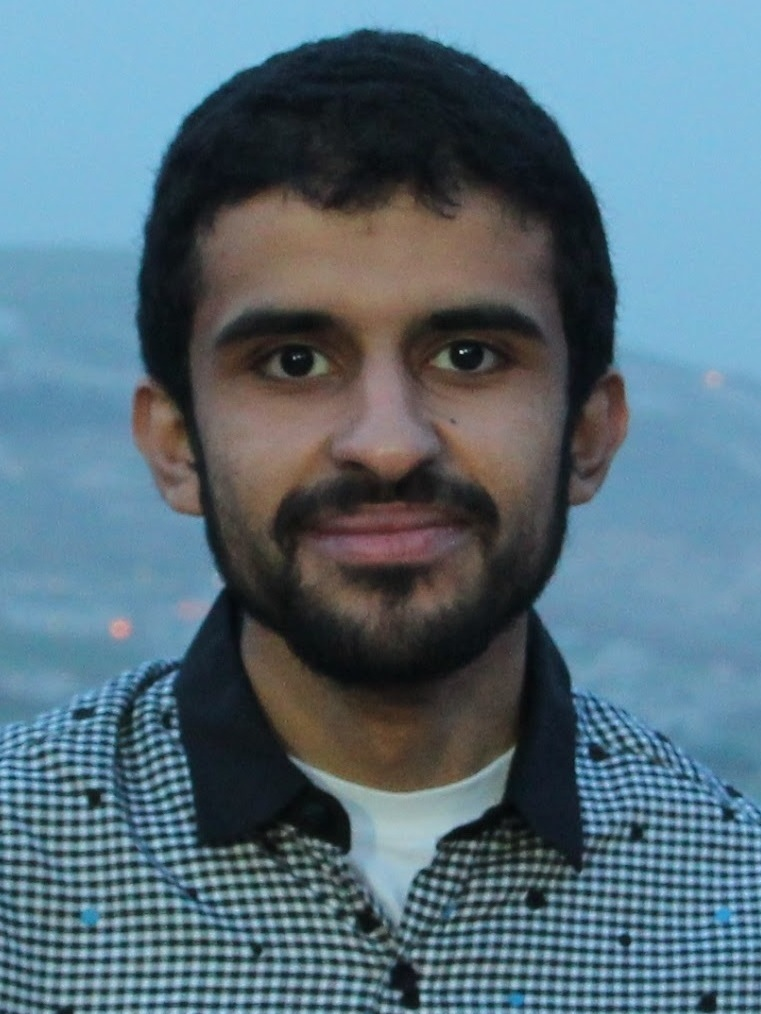
- Khalid in March 2016
- Born: 19 January 1994 (age 32)
- Occupations: Medical doctor; Wikipedian
- Criminal charges: Swaying public opinion
- Criminal penalty: 32 years
- Criminal status: Incarcerated

Osama Khalid (Arabic: أسامة خالد, romanized: ʾUsāma Khālid, pronounced [ʔuˈsaːma ˈxaːlid]; born 19 January 1994) is a Saudi Arabian medical doctor and Wikipedia administrator. In 2020, he was sentenced to 32 years in prison on charges of "swaying public opinion" and "violating public morals" by posting content "deemed to be critical about the persecution of political activists in the country".

According to human rights activists, his arrest and prison sentence was because he contributed information to Wikipedia about the persecution of political activists in Saudi Arabia. According to the joint statement by Washington-based whistleblower organization DAWN and Beirut based digital rights group SMEX, the arrest of Khalid is speculated to be part of a crackdown on Wikipedia administrators.

A joint statement signed by 33 organizations, including Freedom House and Amnesty International, called on the Saudi authorities to release Khalid and all others unjustly imprisoned for their online expression.

== Arrest ==
According to the sources from the Democracy for the Arab World Now and Social Media Exchange, Osama Khalid and fellow Arabic Wikipedia administrator Ziyad al-Sofiani were arrested on the same day in July of 2020. The Specialized Criminal Court of Saudi Arabia, the counter-terrorism court of the country, initially sentenced him to five years in al-Ha'ir prison in Riyadh. In September 2022, the court increased his sentence to 32 years for the same charges. On appeal, his sentence was reduced to 25 years in 2023, and then to 14 years in 2025.

Excessive prison sentences have been described as a tool of repression of the Saudi government by ALQST, citing both Khalid's sentence, and those of Salma al-Shehab, Nourah al-Qahtani and Sukaynah al-Aithan, amongst others.

== Organizations advocating for release ==
- Access Now
- ALQST
- Amnesty International
- ARTICLE19
- ALQST
- Centre for Applied Human Rights at the University of York
- Center for Democracy and Human Rights in Saudi Arabia
- Centre for Social Change
- DAWN
- Digital Action
- Digital Citizenship
- Digital Rights Foundation
- Electronic Frontier Foundation
- Equidem
- ESOHR
- FairSquare
- Freedom Forward
- Freedom House
- Global Forum for Media Development
- Gulf Centre for Human Rights
- Internet Freedom Foundation
- Index on Censorship
- International Federation for Human Rights
- International Service for Human Rights
- Majal (organization)
- MENA Rights Group
- Muwatin Media Network
- Myanmar Centre for Responsible Business
- PEN America
- RootsAction
- SMEX
- Tech Global Institute
- The Tor Project
- Rinascimento Green
- Social Media Exchange.
- South Durban Community Environmental Alliance
- ReThinking Foreign Policy
- Urgent Action Fund for Feminist Activism

== See also ==
- List of people imprisoned for editing Wikipedia
- List of Wikipedia people
