= Nourah al-Qahtani =

Saudi Arabian academic jailed for social media posts

- نورة القحطاني
- Citizenship: Saudi Arabia
- Occupation: Academic
- Known for: Forty-five year prison sentence for alleged criticism of the Saudi Arabian government

Academic background
- Education: University of Leeds
- Thesis: The Dynamics of Interpretive Communities and the Contemporary Saudi Novel: A Study in the Reception of Abdo Khal, Raja Alem, Rajaa Alsanea and Yousef al-Mohaimeed (2017)
- Doctoral advisor: James Dickens; Sameh Hanna Soliman

Academic work
- Discipline: Literature
- Sub-discipline: Arabic literature
- Institutions: King Saud University
- Main interests: Saudi literature Arab Spring in culture

Noura Bint Saeed Bin Abdullah Al-Qahtani, also Noura Saeed Algahtani (Arabic: نورة بنت سعيد بن عبدالله القحطاني), is a Saudi Arabian academic and writer, who was Professor of Modern Literature and Criticism at King Saud University (KSU), specialising in modern Saudi literature. She was arrested in 2021 on charges related to alleged social media usage that criticised aspects of Saudi society. Her initial sentence of thirteen years imprisonment was appealed by the prosecution and she was re-sentenced in 2022 to 45 years imprisonment. This change to her sentencing, based on revised charges, resulted in many human rights organisations, such as International Bar Association’s Human Rights Institute, UN Working Group on Arbitrary Detention, Amnesty International, International Service for Human Rights and CIVICUS requesting her release.

== Education and career ==
Reporting by The Kashmir Monitor in 2022 stated that al-Qahtani was Professor of Modern Literature and Criticism at King Saud University (KSU). She graduated with a PhD from the University of Leeds in 2017; her thesis focused on the reception of Saudi literature in western society. Her thesis examined works by Abdo Khal, Raja Alem, Rajaa Alsanea and Yousef al-Mohaimeed. She has also published on post-Arab Spring novels and identity.

== Arrest and sentencing ==
On 4 July 2021 al-Qahtani was arrested by the Saudi government, which accused her of "using the internet to break the social fabric" and "violating public order by using social media". These charges were based on anonymous social media activity attributed to her on the platform Twitter. The posts in question are said to have criticised the government and supported the rights of political prisoners. At the time of her arrest, one of two attributed accounts, under the username @Najma097, had close to 600 followers. It is not known how the anonymous account was linked to al-Qahtani by the prosecution.

On 16 February 2022 al-Qahtani was sentenced to thirteen years in prison, with a travel ban of thirteen years to be enforced upon her release. However, half the prison sentence was suspended so her initial punishment would have been a six-and-a-half year prison term; however the prosecution appealed for a harsher punishment. This was filed on 22 March 2022, and included further charges, which cited article 6 of the Anti-Cybercrime Law, and articles 30, 34, 35, 38, 43, 44 and 57 of the Anti-Terrorism Law. They also stated that al-Qahtani had possessed a banned book by the scholar Salman al-Ouda, and also “insult[ed] the symbols of the State". This book was described in The Guardian by al-Ouda's son as "very apolitical".

On 9 August 2022 al-Qahtani was sentenced by the Saudi Specialised Criminal Court of Appeal to 45 years imprisonment, with a subsequent 45 year travel ban. According The Guardian, al-Qahtani's defence included that she was not associated with terrorism or terrorist organisations, that she regretted her actions, and was almost fifty years old.

As of 2024 Al-Qahtani's prison term was believed to be the longest given to a peaceful activist in the country.

== International response ==
Al-Qahtani's re-sentencing was first brought to global attention by the organisation Democracy for the Arab World Now (DAWN) who shared Saudi judicial documentation with The Guardian. The extreme sentencing brought the actions of the Saudi government to international scrutiny, with a range of organisations, such as the International Bar Association’s Human Rights Institute (IBAHRI), calling for al-Qahtani's immediate release. The UN Working Group on Arbitrary Detention declared al-Qahtani's imprisonment arbitrary and in June 2023 called for her immediate release.

Excessive prison sentences have been described as a tool of repression of the Saudi government by ALQST, a human rights organisation, citing both al-Qahtani's sentence, and those of Salma al-Shehab, Osama Khalid and Sukaynah al-Aithan amongst others. On International Women's Day, 8 March 2024, a range of organisations, such as Amnesty International, International Service for Human Rights and CIVICUS, reiterated calls for al-Qahtani's release from prison, as well as those of other women sentenced for similar alleged activities. On 24 September 2024 DAWN, ALQST, Freedom House and MENA Rights Group called for western governments to send observers to upcoming hearings for al-Qahtani and al-Shebab.

== Personal life ==
Al-Qahtani is from the Qahtan tribe. She has five daughters, one of whom has a disability.
