= Censorship in Saudi Arabia =

Saudi Arabia maintains one of the world's most restrictive censorship regimes, characterized by close state monitoring and restrictions of media, internet, and public expression under official state law.

Multiple forms of media including books, newspapers, magazines, films, television, and content published on the Internet are censored in the country.

Changes have been made to lessen these restrictions; however, some government-led efforts to control information have also drawn international attention. In 2014, Reporters Without Borders described the government as, "relentless in its censorship of the Saudi media and the Internet," and in 2018, it ranked Saudi Arabia 169th out of 180 countries for freedom of the press.

== Law and operation ==
Though formal laws regarding censorship were not yet in place for Saudi Arabia, hostile conditions in the country led leaders to take on stricter rules that in turn affected the media. Specifically, the Iranian Islamic revolution and seizure of the Grand Mosque by extremists in 1979 led the government to crack down on radical Sunnis. The government under King Khalid, and later his brother King Fahd, enforced policies to help counteract potential hostility and unrest, such as working closely with the religious establishment to create reforms.

Government regulation of media was not formally detailed until 1992, when a new wave of discontent emerged. The government released a 1992 media policy statement, which outlined aims for journalists including both a religious and political component in favor of Islam and Saudi Arabia respectively.

Saudi Arabia is distinct from other Gulf Cooperation Council countries in that its constitution does not protect freedom of expression. The Basic Law of Governance, enacted as an informal constitution in 1992, formally specified limits to free expression. Article 39 of the kingdom's Basic Law of Governance states that:

[The media] is prohibited from committing acts leading to disorder and division, affecting the security of the state and its public relations, or undermining human dignity and rights.

The Law of Printing and Publication, enacted in 2003, expanded upon the regulation of media, encompassing books, drawings, writings, photographs, films, recordings, radio and television broadcasts. The law, which is enforced by the Ministry of Culture and Information, requires government licensing for any of the aforementioned activities. It lays out a series of restrictions, including that the printed matter will not conflict with Sharia law, will not threaten public security, and will not "stir up discord among citizens." Though this law was written in the context of print media, it also extends to electronic media. In 2007, the Saudi government issued an Anti-Cyber Crimes Law, which lists cyber crimes that can result in imprisonment and fines. The law specifically prohibits content that negatively impacts public order, religious values, public morals, and privacy, "through the information network or computers," which can include content that promotes drug use, pornography, gambling, or terrorism.

A 2011 royal decree extended the licensing requirement to include online newspapers and blogs and increased penalties for violations of the earlier press law. Those penalties include large fines, removal of the content, and potentially closure of the establishment responsible, along with suspending or banning the person or group from future publishing. In charging individuals with violations, the government often applies these laws, sometimes in conjunction with counterterrorism laws. These laws extend the definition of terrorism to include content that is damaging to Saudi Arabia, its reputation, stability, and security.

The Ministry of Information is responsible for overseeing Saudi media and has been called the "main agent of censorship" in the kingdom. A special unit, the Management of Publications department, analyzes publications and issues "directives" to newspapers and magazines that state the way in which a given topic must be treated. According to the Encyclopedia of Censorship, "The main effect of this system has been to impose on journalists rigorous self-censorship."

== Press ==
The print media in Saudi Arabia, though privately owned, is closely tied to the government. The registration of new journalists, changes in staff of a media outlet, and creation of new outlets all require government approval. Due to government subsidies, the daily newspapers often rely on state support and tend to align with the Saudi Press Agency on more controversial topics. Despite this, newspapers have increasingly published stories on topics such as crime, drug trafficking, and extremism.

Some censorship of foreign newspapers and magazines targets content of sexual nature, including nudity, pornography, and homosexuality. In 1994, all Saudi women magazines were banned by the Ministry of Information. This move was considered to be related to the pressures of the religious establishment or ulema. After this ban, nineteen of twenty-four magazines closed down due to the fact that their major revenue had been advertisement earnings paid by Saudi companies.

There are numerous documented instances of the Saudi government forcing the resignation of journalists or banning them from publishing in the country. The Committee to Protect Journalists reported in 2002 that the Ministry of Information forced two different newspaper editors to resign and fired the head of a publishing house due to the critical and liberal nature of what they had published. Several more writers were banned from the press in 2003, including Wajeha Al-Huwaider, a writer for Al-Watan and Arab News and a prominent women's rights activist.

Though the Ministry of Information is responsible for monitoring the press, the religious establishment in Saudi Arabia also alerts of the government of journalists. In some cases, religious clerics called for punishments including death to be given to critics of Wahhabi Islam in the media. These punishments were sometimes issued in religious court, such as in 2003 when the journalist Mansour al-Nogaidan claimed he was sentenced to 75 lashes for his articles criticizing the religious doctrine of the country.

=== Jamal Khashoggi ===
The assassination of journalist Jamal Khashoggi gained international attention. After many years serving as a reporter and foreign correspondent for several Arab newspapers, Khashoggi worked as a deputy editor-in-chief of Arab News from 1999 to 2003. In 2003, he became the editor-in-chief for Al Watan, a daily newspaper that pushed for reform in Saudi Arabia and published information of more sensitive issues, specifically regarding the Riyadh compound bombings. Khashoggi was dismissed from his position at Al Watan because under his leadership columnists wrote articles questioning the religious police and criticizing the country's following of Ibn Taymiyyah, the Islamic scholar who inspired Wahhabism. He left Saudi, and began working in the Saudi Embassy in Washington, D.C., but later returned to Al Watan until he was once again removed three years later.

After leaving Al Watan, Khashoggi appeared as a commentator on different Arab and international news channels and wrote for a variety of publications. Khashoggi was a columnist for Al-Hayat newspaper but was banned in December 2016 after he wrote articles criticizing Donald Trump. He left the Kingdom, going into a "self-imposed exile" in the United States in 2017 due to fear of arrest, and began writing for The Washington Post.

On 2 October 2018, Khashoggi went missing after he entered the Saudi Consulate in Istanbul to collect some documents from the Consulate. Saudi officials claimed that they were not responsible for Khashoggi's death but were not able to provide evidence of what happened. Meanwhile, Turkish officials stated that Saudi agents killed and dismembered him, before dumping him in a Turkish forest. Saudi officials later reported that Khashoggi died in a fight with people he met in the consulate. After several weeks of contradictory claims from the Saudi government, the U.S. Central Intelligence Agency concluded that Crown Prince Mohammad bin Salman ordered the assassination of Khashoggi, although the matter of who directed the assassination is still in question by some parties.

This case was highly publicized due to the notability of Khashoggi as a reporter with ties to the royal family who faced numerous restrictions in his career as a journalist.

In May 2019, Amnesty International claimed that Saudi Arabia used NSO Group's Pegasus software to target activists and journalists, including Khashoggi. Deputy Director of Amnesty Tech claimed that "governments who are known for outrageous human rights abuses" use this software to track down the dissidents and human rights defenders. The Kingdom Came to Canada, a Citizen Lab's report, shows how Omar Abdulaziz, another Saudi activist residing in Canada, was targeted by the Saudi government to access the sensitive conversations he had with his friend Jamal Khashoggi. Abdulaziz had also filed a lawsuit in December 2018, alleging that the Saudi authorities used Pegasus spyware to hack his phone and access his conversations.

=== Osama bin Laden ===
Osama bin Laden was a Saudi Arabian citizen who had his nationality cancelled after he started to criticize Saudi Arabia. He later travelled to nearby Afghanistan and spent his final years there.

== Persecution and Suppression of Civil Society Activists Abroad ==
Saudi Arabia routinely engages in suppressing its critics abroad, including pressuring international organizations to erase or downplay criticism of the Kingdom. According to Freedom House, the regime is known for the extensive use of "spyware, proxy punishment, detentions, assaults, and renditions in nine countries spanning the Middle East, Europe, North America, and Asia".

In 2026, the High Court of England and Wales found out that Saudi Arabia "ordered and directed the hacking of London-based dissident Ghanem al-Masarir’s electronic device through the deployment of the Pegasus spyware program". The findings led to a severe criticism by human rights NGOs during the 61st session of the United Nations Human Rights Council, calling for "strengthened international accountability and strict regulations on the use of spyware to protect activists and dissidents, particularly those living in exile." In 2025, Saudi Arabia demanded the United Nations' Internet Governance Forum to erase criticism by a well-known human rights dissident from its archives. In 2021, human rights defender Abdulrahman Al-Khalidi was arrested in Bulgaria, where he sought to request asylum in the aftermath of the assassination of Jamal Khashoggi. He reported that was arrested in administrative charges and a Saudi representative oversaw the proceedings alongside the Bulgarian representatives.

== Film and television ==
Public cinemas became illegal in 1983 when conservative clerics deemed cinemas a corrupting influence, claiming that both Western and Arab-language films were, "contrary to the teachings of Islam."

Over time, the ban on movie theaters was counteracted by the introduction of satellite television and video downloads, as well as by Saudis regularly visiting nearby Dubai and Bahrain where they could go to public cinemas freely. As citizens tried to circumvent some of these restrictions, the Saudi government lessened their regulations, but maintained some level of censorship. The government initially banned ownership of satellite television receivers in 1994. However, after an increasingly large percentage of the population bought satellite receivers and subscribed to various programming packages, the Saudi government grew more willing to tolerate satellite television as long as the programming content was not pornographic, critical of the Saudi government or Islam.

Instances of censorship continued mainly due to the content of broadcasts. In 2005, two episodes of American Dad!, Stan of Arabia: Part 1 and Part 2, were banned by the Saudi government. The English daily ArabNews published an article that accused the series, which had scenes regarding the intolerance of homosexuality and the ban of alcohol, of portraying Saudi Arabia in a negative light.

In 2008, disgruntled callers on a live show on Al Ekhbariya news channel displayed discontent with the latest governmental salary increases and made critical remarks of some Saudi officials. Information Minister, Iyad Madani, then fired the network's director, Muhammad Al-Tunsi, and replaced him with one of his personal assistants. The minister also announced a temporary suspension of live broadcasts for all Saudi public TV channels.

In recent years, the country has moved towards lifting the restrictions on this form of media. In 2007, permission was granted to two hotels to screen American children's films, to celebrate the end of Ramadan. The following year, the first Saudi film festival took place. In December 2017, the Saudi government announced its decision to end the three decade ban on public cinemas, as part of Crown Prince Mohammad bin Salman's campaign to introduce nationwide changes to help broaden and strengthen the economy.

By early 2018, the Ministry of Information began licensing the opening of movie houses, but noted that all movies were subject to existing media laws, stating that films would be "subjected to censorship based on the media policy of the kingdom". For instance, a 40-second scene involving two characters kissing was removed from the first movie screened in public theaters, Black Panther.

=== Banned films ===
Date	Title	Notes
1959	Ben-Hur	Banned from all Arab League states because actress Haya Harareet was Israeli.
1962, 1967	Calypso Cat and Jerry, Jerry, Quiet Contrary	Both short films are banned as inappropriate.
2001–2018	All Harry Potter films	Banned for alleged occultism and satanism propaganda. In 2018, the ban was lifted.
2003	Bruce Almighty	Banned for the blasphemous content and depiction of God.
2004	Fahrenheit 9/11	Banned for being critical of the Iraq war and being an insult to Saudi Arabia's royal family.
2006	Borat	Banned in every Arab League country except Lebanon.
2013	King of the Sands	Banned for depicting the Saudi Arabia country founder Ibn Saud.
2014	Noah	Banned for depicting the prophets.
2020	Onward	Banned due to the film's minor reference to a lesbian relationship.
2021	Bell Bottom	Banned for allegedly tampering with historical facts.
2021	Eternals	Banned due to the film's character of Phastos and his husband.
2022	West Side Story	Reportedly banned to the film's portrayal of a transgender character.
2022	Lightyear	Banned due to a brief lesbian kiss scene.
2022	Everything Everywhere All at Once	Banned due to the film's depiction of an openly gay character and a lesbian couple.
2022	Doctor Strange in the Multiverse of Madness	Banned due to the film's character America Chavez being a lesbian.
2022	Sita Ramam	Unknown, likely banned for hurting religious sentiments.
2023	Demon Slayer: Kimetsu no Yaiba – To the Swordsmith Village	The first Japanese film to be banned due to a scene's explicit nature where Mitsuri Kanroji, Love Hashira, takes a shower in the hot spring. The ban was lifted when Ufotable allows to censor the mentioned scene.
2024	Bhool Bhulaiyaa 3	Banned because of homosexual references
2024	Singham Again	Banned due to religious conflicts

== The Internet ==
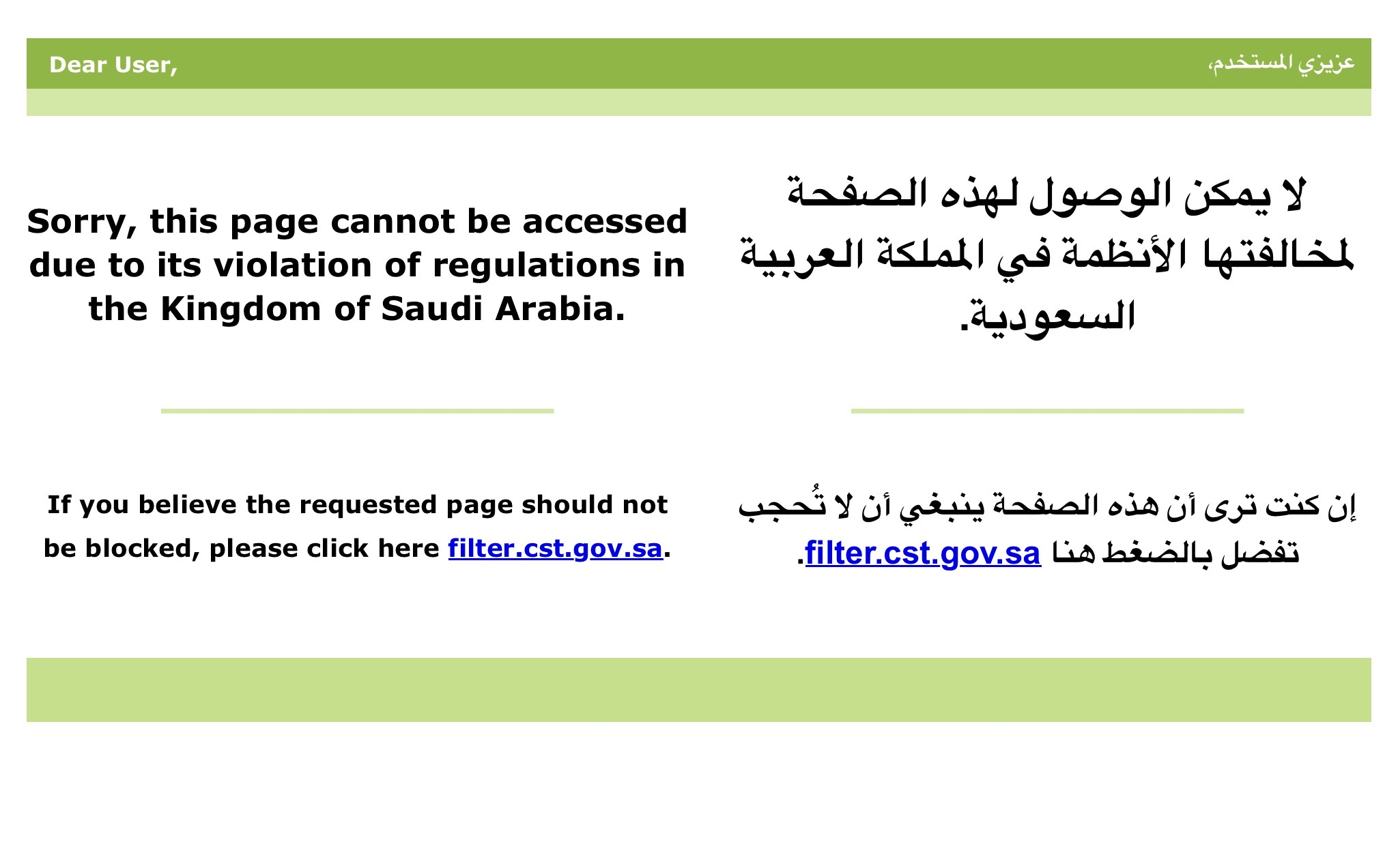
Current version

Saudi Arabia directs all international Internet traffic through a proxy farm located in King Abdulaziz City for Science & Technology. A content filter is implemented there, based on software by Secure Computing. Since October 2006, the Communications and Information Technology Commission (CITC) has been handling the DNS structure and filtering in Saudi Arabia in the place of KACST. Additionally, a number of sites are blocked according to two lists maintained by the Internet Services Unit (ISU): one containing "immoral" (mostly pornographic or supportive of LGBT-rights) sites and sites promoting Shia Ideology, the others based on directions from a security committee run by the Ministry of Information (including sites critical of the Saudi government). Citizens are encouraged to actively report "immoral", mostly adult and pornographic, sites for blocking using a provided web form, available on the government's website.

The initial legal basis for content filtering is the resolution by Council of Ministers dated 12 February 2001. According to a study carried out in 2004 by the Open Net Initiative "the most aggressive censorship focused on pornography, drug use, gambling, religious conversion of Muslims, and filtering circumvention tools." Additionally, Saudi Arabia blocks websites affiliated with Iran, with Hezbollah, with groups in Yemen, websites associated with the Muslim Brotherhood in Syria, and information related to the Holocaust. Saudi Arabia, like other countries, utilizes technology often from Western companies, such as American-owned SmartFilter, in order to automatically filter websites based on certain topic material. The government also monitors for unusual spikes in internet traffic related to content it wants to censor. An example of this filtering was seen after the killing of journalist Jamal Khashoggi in 2018, when the number of websites being censored in Saudi Arabia reportedly doubled, particularly websites of foreign news services such as Fox News and the Canadian Broadcasting Corporation. This is according to Censored Planet, an online initiative that aims to track online censorship through multiple methods, including scanning internet protocol (IP) addresses associated with particular websites.

=== Censorship on various platforms ===
==== Before 2019 ====
In 2011, the Saudi government introduced new Internet rules and regulations that require all online newspapers and bloggers to obtain a special license from the Ministry of Information. Liberal activists are monitored both on blogs and on social media. In a highly public 2012 case, a blogger, Raif Badawi, was sentenced to 10 years in prison and 1,000 lashes and given a 10-year ban on media work or foreign travel.

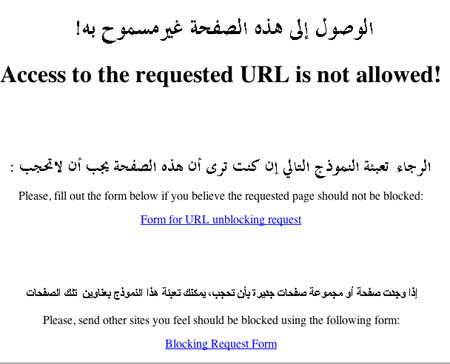
Example of Saudi Arabian ISP blocking a website

On 11 July 2006 the Saudi government blocked access to Wikipedia and Google Translate, which was being used to bypass the filters on the blocked sites by translating them. Though Wikipedia is not blocked currently, specific pages on Wikipedia were reported to be censored by Saudi Arabia in 2011, such as one page discussing the theory of evolution. Encrypted connections denoted by "HTTPS" made censorship more difficult for these pages and today there is no evidence that individual pages are still being blocked.

YouTube is not blocked in the country. However, in 2014, Saudi Arabia made plans to regulate local companies producing content for YouTube. The General Authority for Audiovisual Media, a recently formed watchdog, issued a public declaration to regulate the work of YouTube channels. They planned to censor material that is "terrorist" in nature which according to the proposed rule will be any content that "disturbs public order, shakes the security of society, or subjects its national unity to danger, or obstructs the primary system of rule or harms the reputation of the state".

Social media platforms such as Twitter and Facebook are widely used in Saudi Arabia, with 29 per cent of active Twitter users and 13 per cent of active Facebook users in the Arab region being users from Saudi Arabia as of 2017. Saudi Arabia was also accused of infiltrating Twitter through a Saudi employee that joined the company in 2013, this employee was put on leave two years later after the potential plot was brought to the attention of Twitter.

==== Since 2019 ====
On 13 July 2020, public records showed that the UK government was selling wiretaps, spyware and other equipment to 17 repressive regimes, including Saudi Arabia, the United Arab Emirates, Bahrain and China.

In September 2020, two editors of the Arabic Wikipedia were arrested on the same day: Osama Khalid was sentenced to 32 years in prison while Ziyad al-Sofiani was sentenced to eight years, according to Smex, a Lebanese NGO to advance self-regulating information societies in the Arab-speaking world, and Democracy for the Arab World Now. The Wikimedia Foundation subsequently identified and banned 16 users who seemed to routinely engage in "conflict of interest editing"—reportedly including spying for the Saudi government. Al-Sofiani was released from prison in March 2025, while Khalid's sentence was reduced to 14 years in September of the same year.

== See also ==
- Censorship in the Middle East
- Commission for the Promotion of Virtue and Prevention of Vice
- Cinema of Saudi Arabia
- Censorship of LGBT rights in Saudi Arabia
- Tuwaa
- List of people imprisoned for editing Wikipedia
- List of books banned in Saudi Arabia
