= Salma al-Shehab =

Saudi Arabian prisoner of conscience

- سلمى الشهاب
- Born: 1988 (age 37–38); Saudi Arabia
- Occupations: Student, Prisoner of conscience
- Known for: Sentenced to 35 years in prison by the Specialized Criminal Court in what has been cited as the longest prison sentence ever given to a human rights activist in Saudi Arabia

Salma al-Shehab (Arabic: سلمى الشهاب; born 1988) is a Saudi Arabian student and prisoner of conscience who was sentenced to 27 years in prison by the Specialized Criminal Court in what has been cited as the longest prison sentence ever given to a human rights activist in Saudi Arabia. While al-Shehab's initial six-year sentence received relatively little press, her resentencing in August 2022 received international attention and led to criticism of the Saudi Arabian government. Al-Shehab was released in February 2025, according to a statement from London-based rights group ALQST.

== Personal life ==
Al-Shehab is a member of Saudi Arabia's minority Shia population.

At the time of her arrest in January 2021, al-Shehab was a final year dental medicine PhD student at the University of Leeds in the United Kingdom and was married with two children. Prior to moving to the UK, al-Shehab was reported to have worked as a dental hygienist and as a lecturer at Princess Nora bint Abdul Rahman University in Riyadh.

== Arrest and imprisonment ==
In December 2020 al-Shehab retweeted several posts calling for reform in Saudi Arabia, including supporting women's right to drive; the release of local activists including Loujain al-Hathloul; and calling for an end to the country's male guardianship system. In January 2021, while on holiday in Saudi Arabia, al-Shehab was arrested; during her appeal of her sentencing, she stated that she had been kept in custody for 285 days following her arrest before the case was referred to a criminal court, in breach of laws that time in custody should not exceed 180 days; she also stated she was not given access to her lawyer and spent 13 days in solitary confinement. While being held, al-Shehab alleged that her dignity had been "violated" – believed to be reference to physical or sexual assault – and that she had been pressured to say that she was a member of the Muslim Brotherhood.

Al-Shehab was initially sentenced to six years in prison for using the internet to "cause public unrest and destabalise civil and national security" and was initially told she would be released after three years. Her sentence was appealed by the state prosecutor for being "minor in view of her crimes", and in August 2022 her sentence was increased to 34 years, citing multiple violations of Saudi Arabia's counterterrorism and anti-cybercrime laws; including accusations of aiding dissidents by trying to "disrupt public order" and publishing "false rumours" online. In addition, al-Shehab was given a 34-year travel ban from leaving the country, to start following the completion of her prison sentence. Appealing the decision, al-Shehab stated that she had retweeted the posts out of "curiosity" and to "observe others' viewpoints" and queried how her Twitter account, which had around 2000 followers, could be considered significant enough to cause terrorism. Al-Shehab stated her sentence had led to the "destruction" of her future and the future of her children.

== International reaction ==
In Saudi Arabia, Lina al-Hathloul of the Saudi Arabian human rights organisation ALQST stated al-Shehab's treatment demonstrated that the government was "hellbent on harshly punishing anyone who expresses their opinions freely".

Al-Shehab's re-sentencing led to criticism of United States President Joe Biden who, after initially stating his intention to make Saudi Arabia a "pariah state" due to its human rights record, went on to meet Mohammed bin Salman, the country's de facto leader, in what al-Hathloul called "the growing rehabilitation" of the government, a few weeks prior to al-Shehab's re-sentencing. In the United States, The Washington Post published an editorial in response to al-Shehab's treatment calling bin Salman's promises to Biden with regards to improving Saudi Arabia's human rights record as "a farce". The US state department released a statement after al-Shehab's sentencing saying "exercising freedom of expression to advocate for the rights of women should not be criminalised". Senator Dianne Feinstein tweeted she was "extremely troubled" by news of al-Shehab's sentencing.

In September 2022, an open letter from 400 academics in the United Kingdom called on the British government to take "urgent action" to free al-Shehab; a government spokesperson said that ministers had raised concerns with Saudi Arabian authorities and would "continue to do so". Al-Shehab's alma mater, The University of Leeds, said it was "deeply concerned" about al-Shehab's arrest.

35 human rights organisations released a statement calling on international pressure to be put on Saudi Arabia to prevent a further escalation in the "crackdown on free speech" in the country. The Freedom Initiative called al-Shehab's sentencing "abhorrent"; it also been alleged that al-Shehab's harsh sentencing was due in part to her belonging to Saudi Arabia's Shia minority. Amnesty International reported that al-Shehab's sentence had been made to "set an example" to other activists and described her imprisonment as "cruel and unusual"; the British newspaper The Guardian concurred, pointing out that al-Shehab was not a notable or prominent activist and that she had relatively few social media followers. Excessive prison sentences have been described as a tool of repression of the Saudi government by ALQST, citing both al-Shebab's sentence, and those of Nourah al-Qahtani, Osama Khalid and Sukaynah al-Aithan amongst others.

On Twitter, al-Shehab's name trended following her re-sentencing.

In June 2023, the UN issued a Report, calling on the Saudi Government to release her (and other detainees). The UN report highlights the abusive treatment she has received, together with the lack of proper legal representation - and the extremely long sentence.

== Re-Sentencings and Release ==
Al-Shehab's initial March 2022 sentence of six years was increased on appeal to 34 years in August 2022. Al-Shehab also appealed that judgement and the sentence was reduced to 27 years in January 2023. A third appeal in September 2024 reduced the sentence further to four years.

Al-Shehab's final four-year prison sentence concluded in December 2024 and she was released in February 2025.
