= SMEX =

SMEX may refer to:

- Social Media Exchange, a Lebanese non-governmental organization
- Small Explorers program, a NASA program
