= Arabic Wikipedia =

Arabic-language version of Wikipedia

- The logo of Arabic Wikipedia

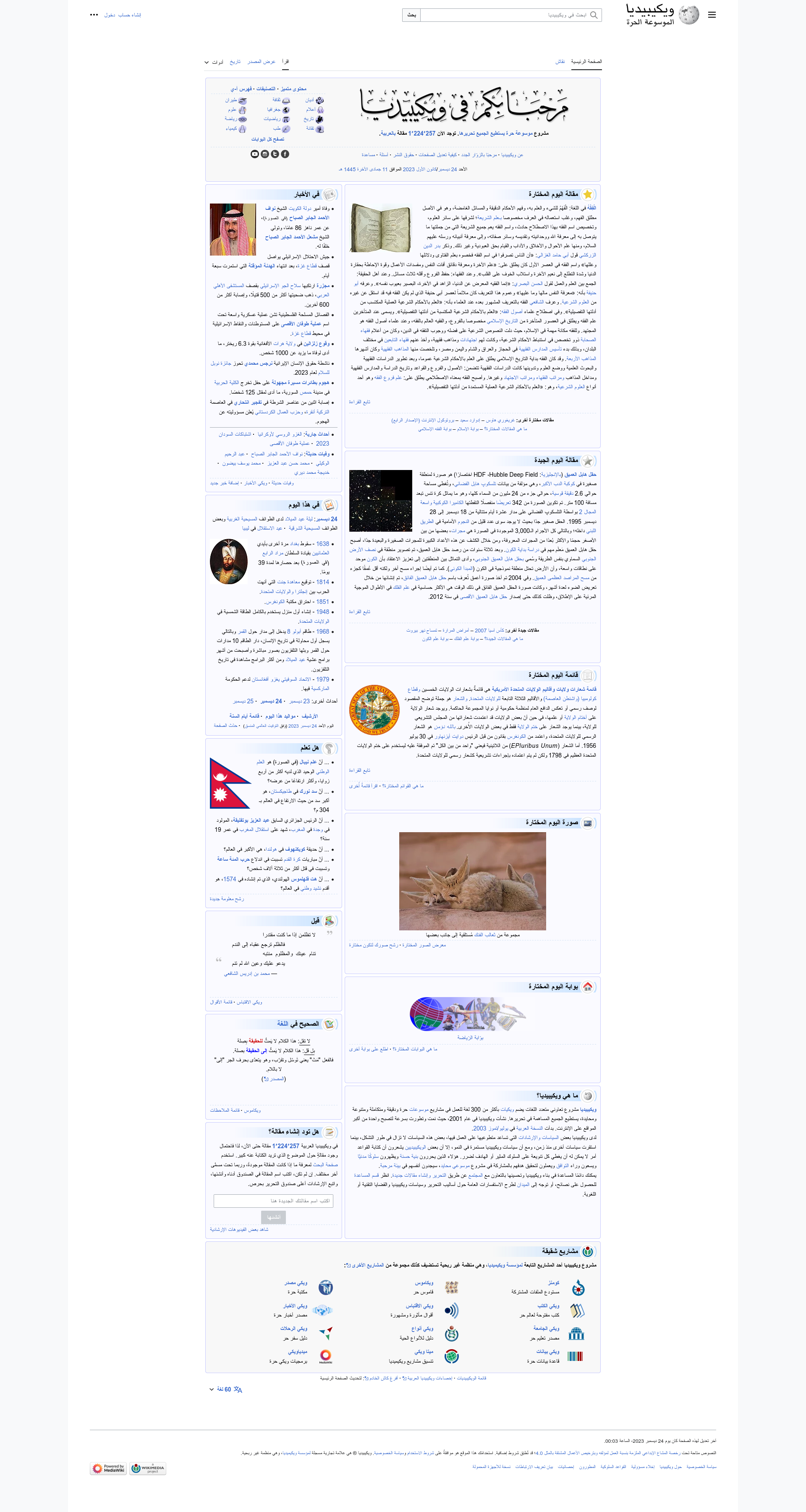
- Arabic Wikipedia's main page on 24 December 2023
- Website type: Internet encyclopedia project
- Available in: Modern Standard Arabic
- Owner: Wikimedia Foundation
- Creator: Arab wiki community
- Website: ar.wikipedia.org
- Commercial: No
- Registration: Optional
- Users: 3.02 million (2026)
- Launched: 9 July 2003; 23 years ago

The Arabic Wikipedia (Arabic: ويكيبيديا العربية, romanized: Wīkībīdyā al-ʻArabīyah) is the Modern Standard Arabic version of Wikipedia. It started on 9 July 2003. As of November 2026, it has 1,338,713 articles, 3,021,413 registered users, and 56,547 files, and it is the 15th largest edition of Wikipedia by article count, and ranks 4th in terms of depth among Wikipedias. It was the first Wikipedia in a Semitic language to exceed 100,000 articles on 25 May 2009, and also the first Semitic language to exceed 1 million articles, on 17 November 2019.

Three varieties of Arabic have their own Wikipedia: Standard, Egyptian, and Moroccan. Additionally, Maltese, derived from Arabic, has its own Wikipedia.

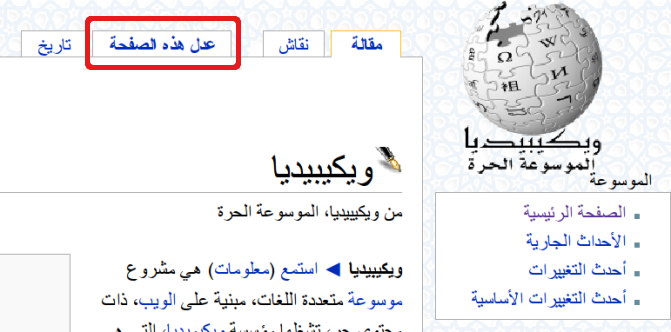
"Edit" button on Arabic Wikipedia screenshot, old background in 2008

== History ==
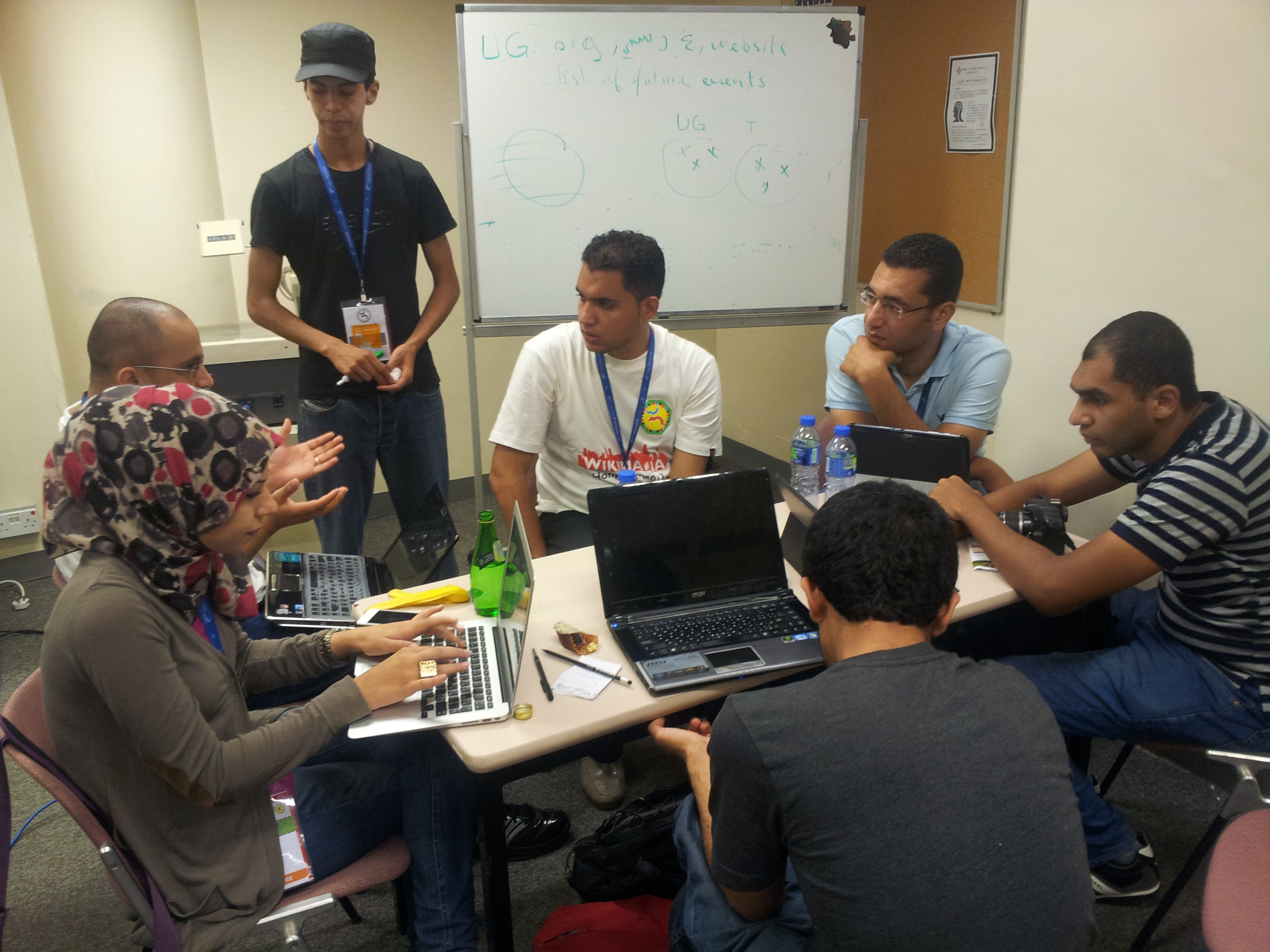
Arab Wikipedians meeting during Wikimania conference in Hong Kong

At the emergence of the Wikipedia project in 2001, there were calls to create an Arabic domain raised by Arab engineers. The domain was created as "ar.wikipedia.org" but no serious activity took place except with anonymous users who experimented with the idea. Until 7 February 2003, all contributors to the Arabic Wikipedia were non-Arab volunteers from the International Project Wikipedia that handled the technical aspects. Elizabeth Bauer, who used the user name Elian in the Arabic Wikipedia, approached many Arabic speakers who potentially might be interested in volunteering to spearhead the Arabic project. The only group who responded was the ArabEyes team who were involved in Arabizing the Open Source initiatives. Elian's request was conservatively received and the ArabEyes team was ready to participate but not take a leadership role and then declined to participate on the second of February 2003. During this negotiation time, volunteer users from the German Wikipedia project continued to develop the technical infrastructure of the Arabic Wikipedia backbone.

In 2003, Rami Tarawneh (Arabic: رامي عوض الطراونة), a Jordanian PhD student in Germany who originated from Zarqa, encountered the English Wikipedia and began to edit content. Contributors encouraged him to start an Arabic Wikipedia. The Arabic Wikipedia opened in July 2003. By that year a significant group of contributors included Tarawneh and four other Jordanians studying in Germany.

On 7 February 2004, one member from the ArabEyes, Isam Bayazidi (Arabic: عصام بايزيدي), volunteered with four other friends to be involved with the Arabic Wikipedia and assumed some leadership roles. In 2004, Bayazid was assigned the SysOp responsibilities and he, with another 5 volunteers, namely Ayman, Abo Suleiman, Mustapha Ahmad and Bassem Jarkas are considered to be the first Arabs to lead the Wikipedia project and they are attributed for working on translating and enforcing the English policies to Arabic. The Arabic Wikipedia faced many challenges at its inception. In February 2004, it was considered to be the worst Wikipedia project among all other languages. However, in 2005, it showed phenomenal progress by which in December 2005, the total number of articles reached 8,285. By that time, there were fewer than 20 contributors and the administrators and contributors made efforts to recruit new users.

In 2007 the secret police in an unspecified country detained Tarawneh and demanded that he reveal the IP address of a contributor. To protect the Wikipedian, the administrators forged a dispute that was the presumed reason for Tarawneh losing his administrator access, so the secret police was unable to obtain the IP. In response to the incident, the rules now state that no one user may have access to all information about the Wikipedia's users.

In 2008 the Arabic Wikipedia had fewer than 65,000 articles and was ranked No. 29 out of the Wikipedias, behind the Esperanto Wikipedia and the Slovenian Wikipedia. Noam Cohen of The New York Times reported that, to many of the attendees of the 2008 Wikimania conference in Alexandria, Egypt, the "woeful shape of the Arabic Wikipedia has been the cause of chagrin." Cohen stated that fewer than 10% of Egyptians are estimated to have internet access and of those with internet access many tend to be knowledgeable in English and have a preference of communicating in that language. The Arabic Wikipedia had 118,870 articles as of 15 January 2010.

As of July 2012 there were around 630 active Arabic Wikipedia editors around the world. Ikram Al-Yacoub of Al Arabiya said that this was "a relatively low figure." At the time there were hundreds of thousands of Wikipedia articles on the Arabic Wikipedia. The Wikimedia Foundation and the nonprofit group Taghreedat established the "Arabic Wikipedia Editors Program" intended to train users to edit the Arabic Wikipedia. By the end of June 2014, the number of articles had reached 384,000.

Iraqi volunteers have translated much of English Wikipedia into Arabic Wikipedia. More recently, a project named Bayt Alhikma has translated more than 10,000 articles about science and other topics in Arabic. The number of active users in Arabic Wikipedia is increasing quickly, reaching the 10,000 mark for first time on 10 February 2021.

== Evaluation ==
The countries in which the Arabic Wikipedia is the most popular language version of Wikipedia are shown in teal.

At Wikimania 2008, Jimmy Wales argued that high-profile arrests like those of Egyptian blogger Kareem Amer could be hampering the development of the Arabic Wikipedia by making editors afraid to contribute.

In 2010, Tarek Al Kaziri, from Radio Netherlands Worldwide, believed that the Arabic Wikipedia reflected the Arabic reality in general. Low participation lowers the probability that the articles are reviewed, developed and updated, and political polarisation of participants is likely to lead to biases in the articles.

According to Alexa Internet, on 26 November 2014, the Arabic Wikipedia was the 10th most visited language version of Wikipedia over a month, with the "ar.wikipedia.org" subdomain attracting approximately 1.8% of the total visitors of the "wikipedia.org" website, despite being ranked no. 22 in terms of the article count. In terms of page views, it was ranked 11th in September 2018 with the same nine Wikipedias above it plus the Polish one. Among the larger Wikipedias, it has one of the lowest ratios of new editors retention and one of the highest rates of edit reversions.

== Usage and page views by country ==
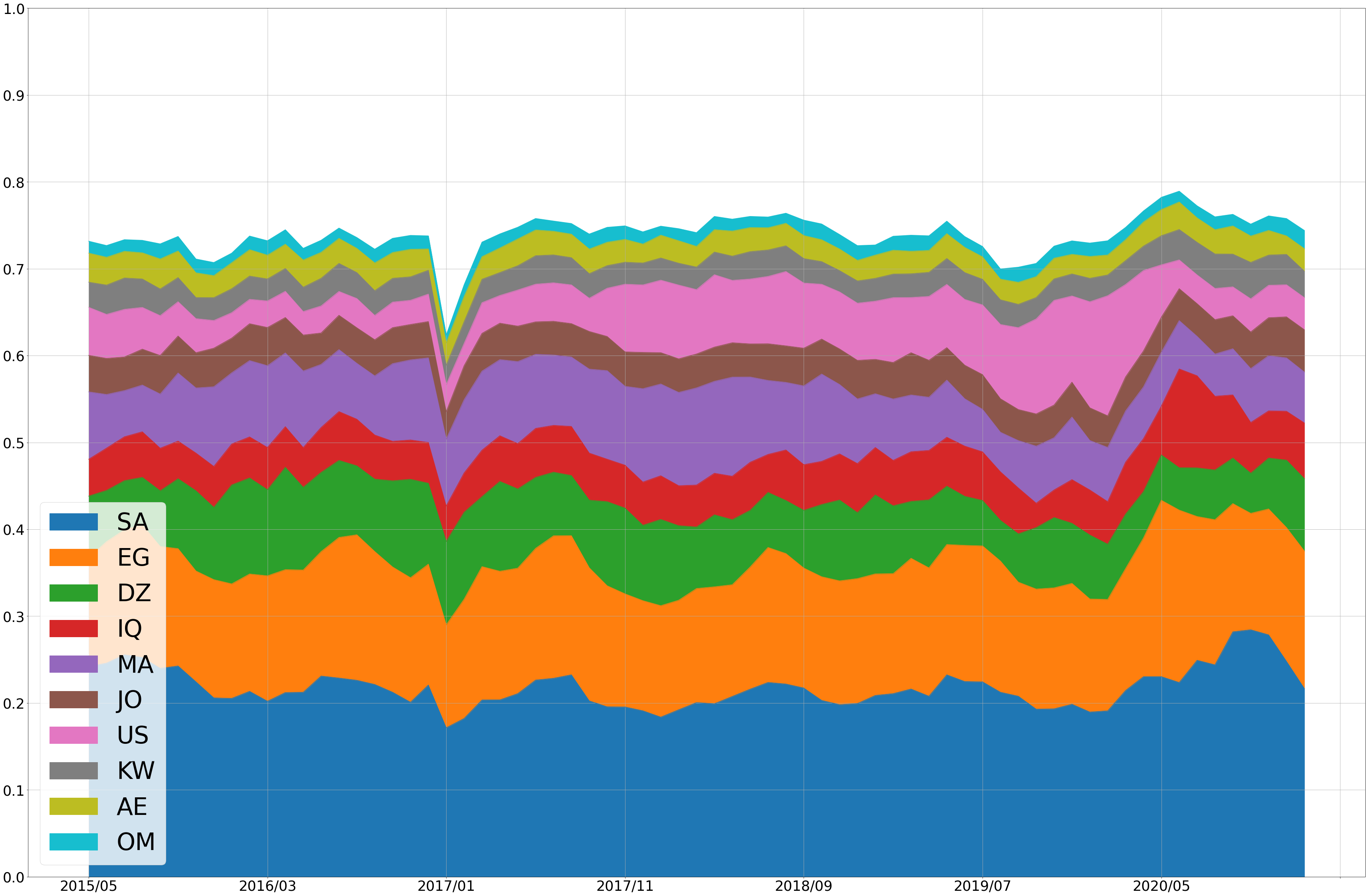
Page views on the Arabic Wikipedia, breakdown by country over time.

Florence Devouard, the former president of the Wikimedia Foundation, stated in 2010 that the largest number of articles on the Arabic Wikipedia were written by Egyptians and that the Egyptians were more likely to participate in the Arabic Wikipedia compared to other groups.

Generally, Arabic Wikipedia, as of 2018, is the most popular language version of Wikipedia in most Arab countries, except Tunisia, Comoros, Chad, Lebanon, Qatar, Bahrain and the UAE. Arabic Wikipedia has its highest percentages in Egypt, Libya and the countries of the Levant (except Israel and Lebanon) and the Arabian peninsula. This discrepancy happens because of the deficits of Wikipedia in Arabic regarding quality and quantity, while in the latter three the lead of English there is associated with the fact that most residents there are migrants from various countries, such as India, Bangladesh, Pakistan, Sri Lanka, Philippines and other countries, where English is the most popular language there.

As of December 2022, Arabic receives around to 180 to 260 million pageviews per month, depending on the season. The most pageviews are recorded in winter and spring.

== Censorship ==
=== Saudi Arabia ===
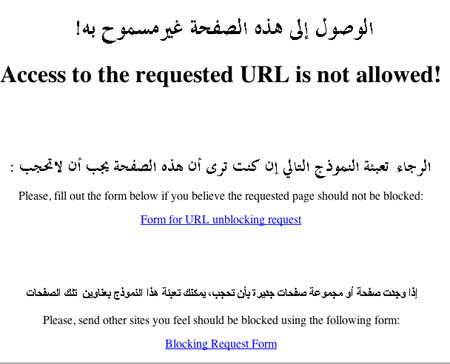
Example of Saudi Arabian ISP blocking a website

On 11 July 2006, the Saudi government blocked access to Wikipedia and Google Translate for what it said was sexual and politically sensitive content. Google Translate was being used to bypass the filters on the blocked sites by translating them. Though Wikipedia is not blocked currently, specific pages on Wikipedia were reported to be censored by Saudi Arabia in 2011, such as one page discussing the theory of evolution. Encrypted connections over HTTPS starting in 2015 made censorship more difficult for these pages and as of 2017 there is no evidence that individual pages are still being blocked.

In September 2020, two Wikipedia volunteer administrators were arrested on the same day: Osama Khalid was sentenced to 32 years in prison while Ziyad al-Sofiani was sentenced to eight years, according to Smex, a Lebanese NGO to advance self-regulating information societies in the Arab-speaking world, and Democracy for the Arab World Now. A subsequent investigation by the Wikimedia Foundation identified 16 users who seemed to routinely engage in conflict-of-interest editing—reportedly including spying for the Saudi government.

=== Ba'athist Syria ===
Access to the Arabic Wikipedia was blocked in Syria in 2008, although other language editions remained accessible.

Bassel Khartabil (Arabic: باسل خرطبيل) was a contributor to a number of open-source projects including Wikipedia; his arrest in 2012 was likely connected to his online activity. He was executed at Adra Prison near Damascus in 2015. Several organizations, including the Wikimedia Foundation, established the Bassel Khartabil Free Culture Fellowship in his honor in 2017, for an initial period of three years.

== Criticisms and controversies ==
=== Allegations of bias ===
The Arabic Wikipedia has been criticized for an alleged Middle Eastern-centric content bias on religious and political topics. A 2014 Wired article described the Arabic Wikipedia, with over 690,000 registered users and more than 240,000 articles, as being "far more than a translation of its English counterpart", with articles often reflecting a worldview shaped by the region's religious and political sensitivities, differing significantly from Western perspectives. Wired reported that Jordanians, upon viewing the English Wikipedia, felt it portrayed what they saw as a racist depiction of Arabs, particularly in representations of Arabs in the desert with camels, and started their own Wikipedia as a result.

Variant of the Arabic Wikipedia logo with the colors of the Palestinian flag, used from October 2023, before the original version was brought back following the 2025 ceasefire. It was subsequently restored after the ceasefire ended.

During the Gaza war, the Arabic Wikipedia website displayed a logo in the colors of the Palestinian flag and a banner urging "an end to the genocide", sparking criticism from Wikimedia Israel and other Israeli commentators. The site also shut down for one day (on 23 December 2023) in solidarity with Gaza. Users were unable to edit during the blackout.

A June 2024 article in the Jerusalem Post criticized the Arabic Wikipedia's article on the war for downplaying Hamas' attacks on civilians and Iran's involvement, among other issues.

In March 2026, the World Jewish Congress published a report alleging systemic bias in Arabic Wikipedia's coverage of the Arab–Israeli conflict. The document stated that 25–50% of citations in related articles were drawn from sources linked to groups such as Hamas and Hezbollah, and criticized the use of phrases like "resistance factions" and "martyrdom operations". It also alleged that some senior administrators rejected Wikipedia's neutrality principle as a "Western concept" and blocked or banned editors who attempted to introduce neutral language.

=== Criticism of content ===
In mid-2020, the Arabic Wikipedia was criticized for deleting its version of the article on Sarah Hegazi after a deletion discussion that found there was a consensus the article did not meet the criteria for notability. Some Arabic LGBT activists on social media accused the Arabic Wikipedia of bias against the LGBT community, and claim the action to be part of censorship, hate speech, and homophobia in the Middle East. The news website Raseef22 criticized Arabic Wikipedia's policies, and said that the project was controlled by prejudiced administrators who reject articles about minorities and women. The administrators of the Arabic Wikipedia said that the deletion process is a normal procedure and has nothing to do with the subject or targeting specific issues.

In April 2022, the European Union's East StratCom Task Force reported that four pro-Kremlin disinformation news outlets (SouthFront, NewsFront, InfoRos and Strategic Culture Foundation) were referenced in 70 articles of the Arabic Wikipedia. This made it the second Wikipedia edition most affected by such disinformation, behind the Russian Wikipedia.
