= Egyptian Arabic Wikipedia =

Egyptian Arabic–language version of Wikipedia

- Website type: Internet encyclopedia project
- Available in: Egyptian Arabic (Articles are written mainly using the Arabic alphabet but a few are written using the Latin alphabet)
- Owner: Wikimedia Foundation
- Website: arz.wikipedia.org
- Commercial: No
- Registration: Optional
- Launched: 24 November 2008; 17 years ago
- Content license: Creative Commons Attribution/ Share-Alike 4.0 (most text also dual-licensed under GFDL); Media licensing varies

The Egyptian Arabic Wikipedia (Egyptian Arabic: ويكيبيديا مصرى [wikiˈbedjæ ˈmɑsˤɾi, wikiˈpidjæ]), also called the Masry Wikipedia, is the Egyptian Arabic version of Wikipedia, a free, open-content encyclopedia. This Wikipedia primarily acts as an alternative to the Arabic Wikipedia for speakers of the Egyptian dialect. Until 2020, it was the only Wikipedia written in a localised dialect of Arabic. The second one is Moroccan Wikipedia, which was approved and created in July 2020.

This edition of Wikipedia has 1,633,685 articles and 295,910 registered users, including 7 administrators.

In December 2022, it was the third most visited language Wikipedia in Egypt with 2 million page views. It ranked below the Arabic Wikipedia (43 million) and the English Wikipedia (18 million).

== History ==
The Egyptian Arabic Wikipedia was proposed on 30 March 2008 and started as a developing project on 2 April 2008 in the Wikimedia Incubator. A Wikipedian with the username Ghaly was the founder of the Egyptian Arabic Wikipedia. Ivan Panović, the author of "The Beginnings of Wikipedia Masry", described Ghaly as the spiritus movens of the Egyptian Arabic Wikipedia. Florence Devouard, the former president of the Wikimedia Foundation, stated that the foundation wanted Wikipedians to participate in their native languages.

The proposal was accepted in July 2008, and the announcement was made on the first day of Wikimania 2008 in Alexandria. On 24 November 2008, the Egyptian Arabic Wikipedia was officially launched, and the Incubator articles were transferred to the new domain.

In 2009, the project had 4,000 articles, and Wikipedians participating came from within and outside Egypt. By 2010 the Egyptian Arabic Wikipedia had almost 6,000 articles. That year, Panović wrote that "The number of active contributors is still rather small, yet their entries seem to be growing." At the time many of the articles were very short articles, or "stubs". Panović wrote that editors of the Egyptian Arabic Wikipedia had a tendency of creating new articles "just for the sake of increasing their number in hopes of expanding them later."

As of September 2018, 60% of Wikipedia views in Egypt were directed at Arabic Wikipedia, 33% to English Wikipedia, 3% to Russian Wikipedia and 2% to Egyptian Arabic. About 35% of Egyptian Arabic Wikipedia views come from Egypt, about 11% from the United States and Saudi Arabia, and about 5% from Morocco, Algeria and Iraq.

== Origin ==
The origin of the proposal for the Egyptian Arabic Wikipedia is based on the active interest of some Egyptian Wikipedians in contributing articles, especially on the Arabic Wikipedia, as they constitute large group of the serious contributors in that Wikipedia.

The idea behind the creation of the Egyptian Arabic Wikipedia is to have an encyclopedia that is written in the language that Egyptians use in their everyday lives. It is hoped this will be much easier for Egyptians to read and encourage more Egyptians to contribute to Wikipedia.

Nabulssi-Masełbas highlights the advocacy for Egyptian linguistic separatism by editors of the Egyptian Arabic Wikipedia. These editors are part of a larger network actively promoting the notion that Egyptian is not merely a dialect of Arabic but rather a distinct language deserving official recognition.

Panović stated that "it is clear that Masry Wikipedians are the proponents of Egyptian territorial nationalism of a kind that sets itself apart from Arab or Islamic nationalism, seeking to carve out a specifically Egyptian identity" and he argued that therefore there was an "ease" in which the Egyptian Arabic Wikipedians "seem to embrace and promote some radical and even erroneous ideas about language." Ghaly is a Christian, and Panović stated that "judging by their contributions and/or user pages" several of those involved are also Christian; Panović stated that minority groups tend to be more active in identity politics.

== Development ==
The International Organization for Standardization (ISO) classification of Egyptian Arabic under the language code arz is one of the arguments used by Egyptian Arabic Wikipedians for considering Masry an independent language. The project uses the Cairene-style Egyptian Arabic.

Ghaly, in the Wikimedia Foundation proposal page for the Egyptian Wikipedia, stated that his view of the Masry Wikipedia was that it would be "written in layperson terms and a mixture between Egyptian slang and simple Arabic", conveying "the information to speakers of Egyptian Arabic in a way similar to what Wikipedia Simple English is doing currently in comparison to Wikipedia English." In response some Wikipedians criticized the proposal stating that it would be a Simple Arabic Wikipedia. Ghaly responded, arguing that he did not intend to actually start a simple Arabic Wikipedia.

As of August 2019, the Egyptian Arabic Wikipedia has over 20,000 articles and continues to grow. In addition, there is a project to develop an Egyptian Arabic Wiktionary, which is in the development phase as a project on Wikimedia incubator. On 28 July 2020 Wikipedia Masry became the eighteenth Wikipedia to have more than one million articles.

== Reaction ==
The Egyptian variant of Wikipedia was controversially received; supporters pointed to the number of Wikipedias written in regional languages and argued that Egyptian Arabic was a widely spoken variant of Arabic, while opponents perceived the creation of the Egyptian-language Wikipedia as an attack on the Arabic Wikipedia and argued that Standard Arabic was the standard language for media, and the use of a regional-language version was anachronistic.

The Egyptian Arabic Wikipedia has been subject to controversy from the start, causing arguments between supporters and opponents. There have been lengthy discussions before the approval of the proposal. Also, there were discussions on other websites apart from meta.wikimedia. This was also based on the differences in definition of a language and a dialect. This is a result of diglossia in Egypt, where the written language is a different dialect than the language used daily, which is not frequently written, although a certain amount of literature (particularly plays and poetry) exists written in the Egyptian dialect in Egypt. As the project developed it was seen occasionally as a manifestation of triglossia of standard Arabic, vernaculars, and a western language in the Arabic section of the cyberspace.

=== Support ===
Amira Samir of the Al-Ahram Hebdo reported that some Egyptians on the internet did not have a problem with the project, arguing that the Wikimedia Foundation was an independent body and therefore the Egyptian government could not force the inclusion or exclusion of any particular dialect.

=== Opposition ===
Discussions and criticism has occurred in some Facebook groups and several blogs and forums. Samir stated that many online users believed that the Egyptian Arabic Wikipedia was an attack on the Arabic language. The primary criticism of the Wikipedia Masry involves the belief that a "degradation" of Arabic occurred when someone writes in a dialect. Panović argues that the criticism is "grounded in folk belief about language" and therefore it is a "futile task" to examine the arguments from a linguistic point of view. According to Panović, many of the critics took note that many involved with the Egyptian Arabic Wikipedia were Christian and that they perceived the project to be antagonistic against the Arab identity and Islam. Panović wrote that "It almost goes without saying there are also those who see in Wikipedia Masry yet another Jewish plot." Others see it as an attempt to divide the Arabs by emphasizing dialects. According to Samir, some critics argued that the Egyptian Arabic language has a lack of rules and variations of meanings in words, and so it is an unsuitable language for an encyclopedia.

Opposition to this version of Wikipedia has been strong during the proposal stage; opposition continued after the project officially launched including campaigns on Facebook. Some of these campaigns encouraged users to vandalize the Egyptian Wikipedia. The main point which the opposition focuses on is that Egyptian Arabic is neither a language, nor used by all Egyptians, suggesting that the effort should be directed to development of Arabic Wikipedia.

== Scholarly research ==
Wikipedia Masry has attracted scholarly attention from researchers in sociolinguistics, language policy, digital activism, and identity politics. Most academic studies have examined the project as a case study in the relationship between language, nationalism, and online knowledge production.

Ivan Panović's 2010 paper, The Beginnings of Wikipedia Masry, was the first academic study devoted entirely to the project. Panović examines the ideological background of the encyclopedia, arguing that its founders viewed Egyptian Arabic as a distinct language rather than a dialect of Arabic. He also analyses the linguistic features of early articles, noting that although contributors sought to write in Egyptian Colloquial Arabic (ECA), the content frequently blended ECA with Modern Standard Arabic (MSA), illustrating the challenges of developing a written standard for a predominantly spoken variety.

Mariam Aboelezz discusses Wikipedia Masry in Language as Proxy in Egypt's Identity Politics, where she presents the project as one manifestation of the resurgence of Egyptian nationalism during the late 2000s. She argues that language functions as a proxy for political and cultural identity, and identifies Wikipedia Masry as an example of how digital platforms can contribute to debates over Egyptian identity and linguistic distinctiveness.

Zuzanna Nabulssi-Masełbas's 2023 monograph, Egyptian Linguistic Separatism: A Study in Wikipedia Masri, provides the most comprehensive academic examination of the encyclopedia to date. The study analyses Wikipedia Masry from historical, ideological, linguistic, social and cultural perspectives. It argues that the project promotes the recognition of Egyptian Arabic as a separate language and places it within the broader context of Egyptian linguistic and cultural nationalism. Nabulssi-Masełbas also identifies Wikipedia Masry as an example of grassroots language planning, examining its orthographic conventions, vocabulary development and editorial practices.

In the related paper A Whole Branch of Alternative Scholarship, Nabulssi-Masełbas traces the intellectual origins of Wikipedia Masry to the Pharaonist movement of the early twentieth century and to contemporary Egyptian nationalist thought. The paper argues that the encyclopedia forms part of a wider movement advocating recognition of Egyptian as a separate language and promoting an Egyptian national identity distinct from pan-Arabism.

More recent computational research has focused on the encyclopedia's content rather than its ideological foundations. A study by Al Sharani et al. examined template-generated articles in the Egyptian Arabic and Moroccan Arabic Wikipedias, finding that a substantial proportion of biographies and geographical entries were automatically generated from templates. The authors reported that such articles typically contained limited prose, few or no citations, and highly standardised structures compared with equivalent articles in the Arabic and English Wikipedias. The study introduced a methodology for detecting template-generated content and released an open dataset to support future research into content quality in low-resource Wikipedia editions.

== See also ==
- Egyptian Arabic
- Arabic Wikipedia
