= Mansour al-Nogaidan =

Mansour al-Nogaidan (Arabic: منصور النقيدان) is a Saudi-Emirati writer, columnist, reformist and journalist. He resides in the UAE and was born in 1970 in Buraidah, Kingdom of Saudi Arabia. al-Nogaidan is divorced and has two children.

== Fundamentalist and Extremist ==
In his teenage years, al-Nogaidan was influenced by the ideas of Buraidah Brothers, a group of Wahhabi austerity who were advocating more commitment towards the teachings of Muhammad bin Abdul Wahab; he consequently abandoned academic school and joined the Wahhabi austerity cult. al-Nogaidan studied principles of Sharia science by classical Islamic way under the guidance of scholars in his city Buraidah from 1985 to 1991.

In 1990, al-Nogaidan was affected by the transformation Saudi Arabia was going through, after Iraq's occupation of Kuwait and the presence of international coalition forces on Saudi territory. Political Islamic preachers raised opposition against the government. In mid-1991, along with a group of jihadists, al-Nogaidan took a part in burning video shops in the capital Riyadh; as a result he was sentenced for two years and eight months in prison.

== Liberal and Activist ==
al-Nogaidan's ideological transformation started in the mid-nineties when he been introduced to the heritage of Islamic rationalists and writings of contemporary Muslim thinkers from Morocco and Jordan.

In 1999, al-Nogaidan published his first article which highlighted the dispute between the Hadith School "rigid followers of Prophet Mohammed preaching" and the Aqel school "followers of more flexible interpretation of Prophet Mohammed preaching" in the early period of Islamic civilization. The article lead to al-Nogaidan's exclusion by the Wahhabi scholars and abandonment by his colleagues and the comrades in his path.

In December 2002, al-Nogaidan gave a cyber-interview at an Islamic forum on the Internet that gained wide publicity because of its bold ideas and harsh criticism of Islamic extremists. The thoughts and arguments against the classical concept of Wahabbism raised concern among clerics of Saudi Arabia; consequently, al-Nogaidan was sentenced for 75 lashes and worse gained a fatwa of blasphemy and call for waste of blood or announcement of his repentance publicly.

al-Nogaidan's articles revolve around Islamic Sunni religious thoughts and issues, also he writes about religious history in Saudi Arabia, issues of faith, and the discrepancy over its concept among the forefathers of Islam. In addition, he writes about the history of the Saudi religious figures in the modern era. al-Nogaidan published research that discussed topics such as the map of the Islamists in Saudi Arabia and the Promotion of Virtue and Prevention of Vice in the Kingdom of Saudi Arabia.

He is currently a member of the Editorial Board at Al Mesbar Studies and Research Centre in Dubai, UAE.

al-Nogaidan was described by British historian Robert Lacey as one of characters influencing the new generation of young Saudis.

Formerly a radical imam, al-Nogaidan had, by his late thirties, altered his thinking and his life. He now speaks out against the training of terrorists in schools and mosques in the Islamic world, which put his safety at risk. In the eyes of Saudi liberals, al-Nogaidan, through his transition from ex-bomber to liberal and activist, represents the hope of transformation in Saudi Arabia.
