= Telecommunications in Venezuela =

In Venezuela the first law on telecommunications was approved in 1940. It identified the responsibility of the state in regard to telephone and other telecommunication systems, including radio and television services.

Telephones – main lines in use: 7.332 million (2011)

Telephones – mobile cellular: 28,782,000 (2011)

Telephone system: modern and expanding
domestic: domestic satellite system with 3 earth stations; recent substantial improvement in telephone service in rural areas; substantial increase in digitalization of exchanges and trunk lines; installation of a national interurban fibre-optic network capable of digital multimedia services; combined fixed and mobile-cellular telephone subscribership 130 per 100 persons.
international: country code – 58; submarine cable systems provide connectivity to the Caribbean, Central and South America, and US; satellite earth stations – 1 Intelsat (Atlantic Ocean) and 1 PanAmSat; participating with Colombia, Ecuador, Peru, and Bolivia in the construction of an international fiber-optic network; constructing submarine cable to provide connectivity to Cuba

== Broadcast media ==
The government of Venezuela supervises a mixture of state-run and private broadcast media; 1 state-run TV network, 4 privately owned TV networks, a privately owned news channel with limited national coverage, and a government-backed Pan-American channel. A state-run radio network includes 65 new stations and roughly another 30 stations targeted at specific audiences. A state-sponsored community broadcasters include 244 radio stations and 36 TV stations. The number of private broadcast radio stations have been declining, but many remain in operation.

== Internet ==
Internet Hosts: 1.016 million (2012)

Internet Users: 8.918 million (2009)

Country code (Top level domain): VE

Venezuela has many Internet service providers, although the market is dominated by the now state-owned CANTV.net which offers ADSL and Dialup services. Broadband access Venezuela is provided through ADSL, Cable, Satellite, EDGE, Evolution-Data Optimized (EV-DO), Wi-Fi Hotspots and more recently WiMax. Prices vary from US$45 to $60 per month for basic broadband plans. Some of the most important providers are:

- CANTV.net – ADSL and Wi-Fi hotspots and also EV-DO through the Movilnet brand.
- Intercable – Cable and Wi-Fi Hotspots
- Movistar – Cable, WLL, EV-DO, UMTS, HSDPA, and LTE
- Movilmax – WiMax (Only available in Caracas)
- Digitel – GSM, UMTS, HSDPA, and LTE
