= Noam Cohen =

American journalist

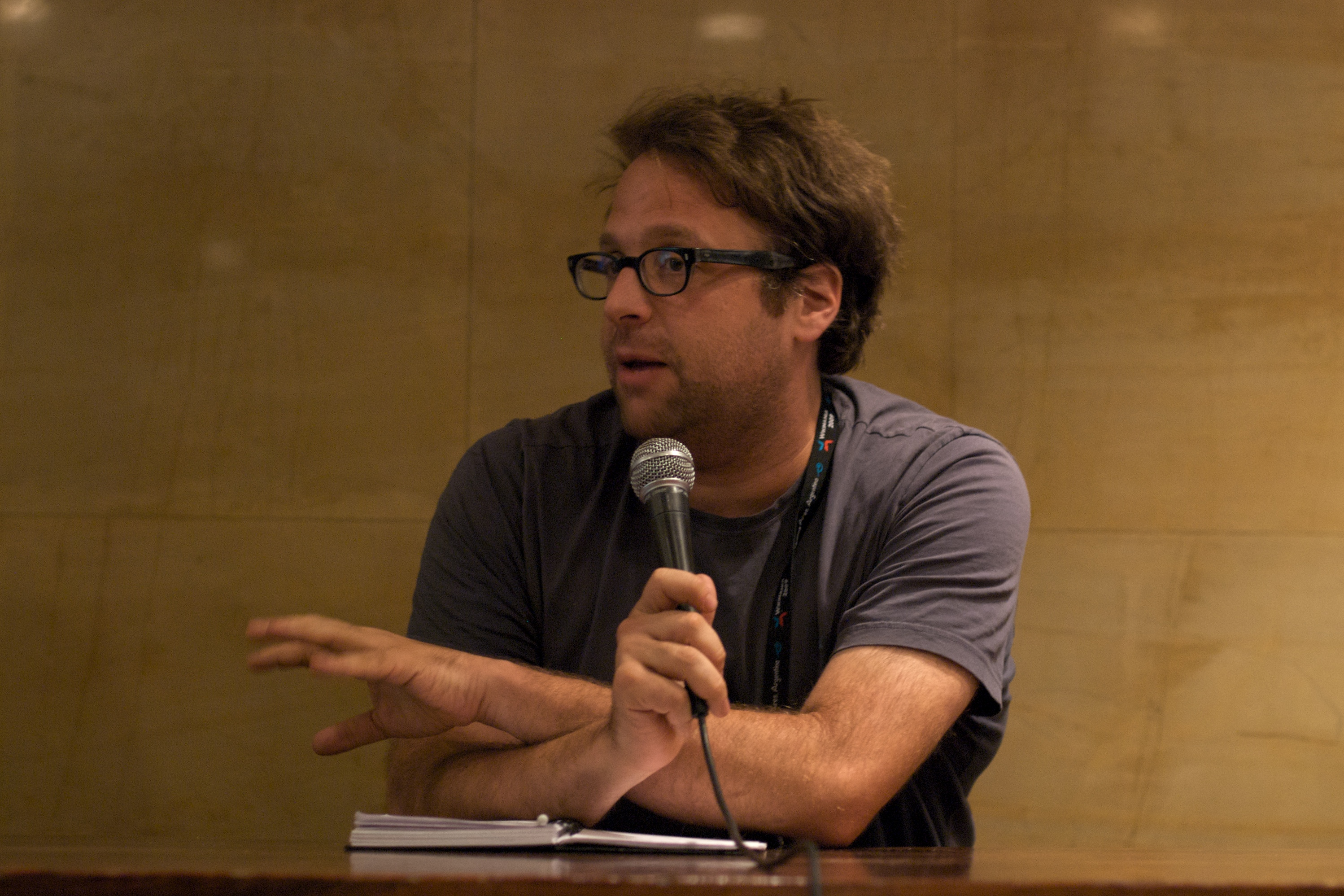
- Noam Cohen at Wikimania 2009
- Education: Harvard College
- Occupation: Journalist
- Writing career
- Genre: Non-fiction

Noam Cohen is an American journalist. He was a technology columnist and author of the "Link by Link" column for The New York Times from 2007 to 2013. He is the author of the 2017 nonfiction book The Know-It-Alls: The Rise of Silicon Valley as a Political Powerhouse and Social Wrecking Ball, about the politics of Silicon Valley. His work has also appeared in Wired magazine. He is a Wikipedia editor.

Cohen was a history major in college. He lives in Brooklyn, New York.

== Bibliography ==
- The Know-It-Alls: The Rise of Silicon Valley as a Political Powerhouse and Social Wrecking Ball, The New Press 2017. ISBN 9781620972106, OCLC 1011339066
- "A war of one's own". Wired. 29.11: 32–37. November 2021.
