= Internet in Saudi Arabia =

Internet in Saudi Arabia was introduced in 1994, initially limited to educational, medical, and research institutions with authorized access. In 1997, a ministerial decree formally permitted broader internet connectivity, and by 1999, access was extended to the general public.

The number of internet users in Saudi Arabia reached approximately 200,000 in December 2000. This number grew significantly, reaching 16 million users by 2013, and then 24 million users by 2017. By 2023, the number of internet users in the Kingdom had increased to 32 million, meaning that the percentage of internet users rose to 99% of the population, compared to 82% in 2017. In 2024, Saudi Arabia jumped to the eighth position globally in internet speed, achieving an average mobile internet speed of 128.03 megabits per second in June, according to a report published by the global website Speedtest.net which specializes in measuring mobile internet speeds. According to the Communications, Space and Technology Commission, the average mobile internet speed in 2023 reached 214.6 megabits per second.

According to a report by mobile analytics firm OpenSignal, Saudi Arabia led the world in 5G download speeds, recording an average speed of 144.5 Mbps. Canada ranked second with an average of 90.4 Mbps, while South Korea placed third with 75.6 Mbps.
