= European Saudi Organisation for Human Rights =

Human rights organisation

European Saudi Organisation for Human Rights (ESOHR)
- Founded: 2013 or earlier
- Purpose: human rights in Saudi Arabia
- Location: Berlin, London
- Region served: Saudi Arabia
- Method: documenting, monitoring and publishing reports on human rights violations, coordinating with institutions and lobbyig governments, providing human rights training, supporting victims
- Key people: Ali Adubisi (Director)
- Website: www.esohr.org/en

The European Saudi Organisation for Human Rights (ESOHR) (Arabic: المنظمة الأوروبية السعودية لحقوق الإنسان) is a Europe-based human rights organisation for documenting and promoting human rights in Saudi Arabia.

== Aims and origin ==
The European Saudi Organisation for Human Rights has published reports on human rights violations in Saudi Arabia since 2013. It describes its work to include documenting and monitoring human rights violations, publishing reports, coordinating with institutions and supporting victims. ESOHR is led by Ali Adubisi, based in Berlin and originally from al-Awamiyah in the Eastern Province, Saudi Arabia of Saudi Arabia, where he was detained many times after the Arab Spring.

== Reports ==
ESOHR's activities over 2013–2018 include translating and commenting on the Saudi Arabian Ministry of Interior January 2012 list of 23 Eastern Province youths that the ministry wished to arrest because of dissident activities, describing the Saudi government's actions in the Eastern Province in 2017 as "a war ... unlike anything seen in [Saudi Arabia's] 80-year history", and warning against Israa al-Ghomgham's August 2018 death sentence as a "dangerous precedent" that could lead to executions of other Saudi political activists.

In 2019, ESOHR provided a detailed report about the 2019 Saudi Arabia mass execution, giving details of enquiries to Saudi authorities about the executees' cases by United Nations special rapporteurs and other United Nations representatives.

== See also ==
- Human rights in Saudi Arabia § Human rights organizations
- Saudi Civil and Political Rights Association (as of 2018, most key members detained)
- ALQST (active as of 2018)
- The Center for Democracy and Human Rights in Saudi Arabia
