= Social Media Exchange =

Lebanese non-governmental organization

Social Media Exchange (SMEX)
- Founded: 2008
- Type: non-governmental organization
- Purpose: Defending and advancing digital rights
- Location: Beirut, Lebanon
- Region served: Arab world
- Key people: Mohamad Najem
- Website: smex.org

SMEX (formerly Social Media Exchange) is a Lebanese non-governmental organization based in Beirut with a mission to advocate for digital rights in the Arab world. It is based in Beirut. Its executive director is Mohamad Najem. SMEX was established in 2008 as Social Media Exchange.

== Bread & Net ==
Bread & Net is an annual unconference that has been held by SMEX in Beirut since 2018 that brings together activists, technologists, policy-makers, and others to discuss global and regional digital rights and other human rights.
