= ALQST =

Saudi human rights organisation

- Founded: August 2014
- Founder: Yahya Assiri
- Purpose: research and advocacy for human rights in Saudi Arabia
- Location: Saudi Arabia, London
- Region served: Saudi Arabia
- Method: researching human rights in Saudi Arabia based on Saudi Arabia based team and publishing documentation and news reports by London team; "lobbying against [human rights violations] using peaceful and legal methods"
- Key people: Yahya Assiri
- Website: alqst.org/eng

ALQST or Al Qst (Arabic: منظمة القسط) is a human rights organisation that documents and promotes human rights in Saudi Arabia, with a team in Saudi Arabia that researches cases and a team in London that publishes reports and news.

== Aims and origin ==
ALQST was founded in August 2014 by Yahya Assiri, a former Royal Saudi Air Force officer, with the aim of documenting human rights violations in Saudi Arabia and publishing reports on these. Assiri described the choice of the name as deliberately using a term from the Quran that means "justice", in order to avoid the organisation being perceived as attacking Saudi Arabian culture.

As of 2023, Lina al-Hathloul, the sister of Loujain al-Hathloul, is ALQST's head of monitoring and advocacy.

== Reports and appeals ==
=== Human rights activists ===
In February 2018, ALQST opposed the conviction and sentencing of Issa al-Nukheifi, who was sentenced to six years' imprisonment, to be followed by a six-year international travel ban and social media ban, for having tweeted his criticism of Saudi authorities for the Saudi Arabian-led intervention in Yemen and against official handling of "criminal proceedings and security procedures".

ALQST has documented the detention of women's human rights activists, including the wave of arrests that started with the detention of Noha al-Balawi in January 2018, who was questioned during her detention for her women's rights activities. Al-Balawi was the first in a 2018 wave of arrests of women's rights activists involved in the women to drive movement and the anti male-guardianship campaign. ALQST described the series of arrests as an "unprecedented targeting of women human rights defenders" while United Nations special rapporteurs called them a "crackdown".

In August 2018, ALQST called for the dropping of charges against Israa al-Ghomgham, a human rights advocate especially known for her documentation of and participation in the Qatif unrest that started in 2011 and continued during 2017–18. ALQST stated that the prosecutor in al-Ghomgham's case had requested that she be sentenced to death for what ALQST described as "her involvement in peaceful rights activism".

=== Muslim scholars ===
In September 2018, ALQST reported that Salman al-Ouda, a Saudi Muslim scholar who had in 1993 co-founded the Committee for the Defense of Legitimate Rights, a Saudi opposition group, risked the death penalty for lèse-majesté in a court case against him in the Specialized Criminal Court.

=== Kafala system ===
In 2018, France 24 and ALQST reported on the use of Twitter and other online social networks by kafala system employers, "kafils", to "sell" migrant domestic workers to other kafils, in violation of Saudi law. ALQST described the online trading as "slavery 2.0".

=== Appeal to United Nations General Assembly ===
In October 2018, ALQST joined 160 other civil society organisations in calling for an independent international investigation into the assassination of Jamal Khashoggi and for Saudi Arabia to be suspended from the United Nations Human Rights Council.

=== Salman reign human rights report ===
In its second annual conference in December 2018, ALQST released a report summarising the human rights situation during the reign of King Salman. ALQST described the beginning of the reign as a "period of repression unprecedented both in its scope and its range of methods, exceeding in intensity anything seen before in previous eras." ALQST listed human rights violations including "excessive use of armed force – including artillery – in a densely-populated residential area" during the 2017–19 Qatif unrest, the Saudi Arabian-led intervention in Yemen, and the assassination of Jamal Khashoggi.

ALQST divided waves of arrests during 2017–2019 into three waves. The 10 September 2017 arrests of Salman al-Ouda, Abdullah al-Maliki, Essam al-Zamel and other academics, intellectuals, media professionals and religious leaders constituted the first wave. The second wave was the 2017 Saudi Arabian purge that started on 4 November 2017, in which several hundred prominent Saudi Arabian princes, government ministers, and business people were detained. ALQST defined the third wave as the 2018 crackdown on women involved in the women to drive movement and the anti male-guardianship campaign and their male supporters. The women were detained and several of them were tortured.

== See also ==
- Human rights in Saudi Arabia#Human rights organizations
  - Saudi Civil and Political Rights Association (as of 2018, most key members detained)
  - European Saudi Organisation for Human Rights (active as of 2018)
