= Democracy for the Arab World Now =

U.S.-based Middle East watchdog non-profit organization

- Abbreviation: DAWN
- Formation: 27 September 2020; 6 years ago
- Founder: Jamal Khashoggi
- Type: 501(c)(3) organization
- Tax ID no.: 82-4378001
- Purpose: Promoting democracy, the rule of law and human rights in the Arab world
- Headquarters: Washington D.C., United States
- Key people: Omar Shakir (Executive Director)
- Website: dawnmena.org

Democracy for the Arab World Now (DAWN) is an American non-profit organization launched in September 2020 that advocates for democracy and human rights in the Arab world. DAWN was founded by Saudi journalist Jamal Khashoggi before his assassination.

== Leadership, aims and funding ==
Director Sarah Leah Whitson said it was established based on the "belief that only democracy and freedom will bring lasting peace and security to the Middle East and North Africa." Whitson said DAWN would be funded by private individuals and foundations and eschew any government financial assistance – in part, precisely because one aspect of its mission is "to hold Western states accountable" for enabling abuses by authoritarian governments. In February 2025, it was announced in a direct statement to her audience that Sarah Whitson would be stepping down as the Executive Director of DAWN. It was not made immediately clear who is planned to succeed her in the position.

== Actions ==
In October 2022, after conducting its own research, DAWN submitted a request to the International Criminal Court investigation in Palestine to investigate Eyal Toledano, a former legal advisor to the Israel Defense Forces, alleging that from 2016 to 2020, Toledano "planned approved, or oversaw acts and policies that constitute war crimes, crimes against humanity, and human rights violations, including ... maintaining a system of apartheid".

In February 2025, DAWN submitted a request to the International Criminal Court to investigate former President of the United States Joe Biden, Secretary of State Antony Blinken, and Defense Secretary Lloyd Austin for "aiding and abetting, as well as intentionally contributing to, Israeli war crimes and crimes against humanity in Gaza".

== See also ==
- Democracy in the Middle East and North Africa
