= Ini (Armenian) =

Letter of the Armenian alphabet

- Ի ի

Usage
- Writing system: Armenian alphabet
- Type: Alphabetic
- Language of origin: Armenian language
- Sound values: i
- In Unicode: U+053B, U+056B
- Alphabetical position: 11

History
- Time period: 405 to present
- Transliterations: I

Other
- Associated numbers: 20

Ini (uppercase: Ի, lowercase: ի; Armenian: ինի) is the eleventh letter of the Armenian alphabet, used in the Armenian language. It has a numerical value of 20 in the Armenian numeral system.

== History ==
It was developed, together with most of other letters, by Mesrop Mashtots, the creator of the alphabet, between 405 and 406.

== Usage ==
The letter is used in the Armenian language, where it corresponds to the close front unrounded vowel sound ([i]). It is romanized as letter I. In Armenian numeral system, the letter corresponds to number 20. The lowercase is like the lowercase H, but its left leg is longer.

== Gallery ==
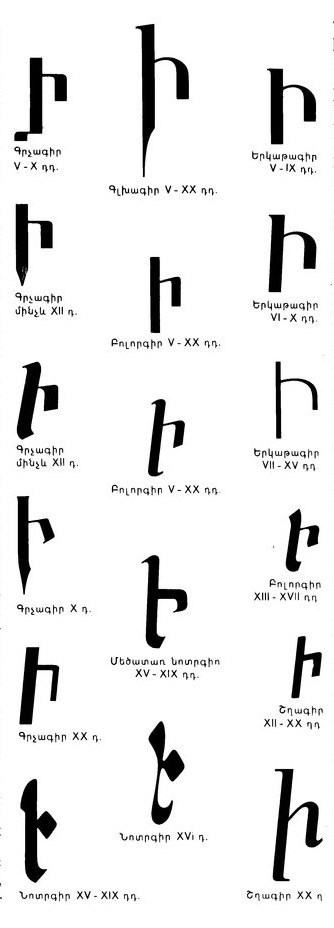
Various historic fonts

Rounded Erkat'agir

Angular Erkat'agir

Bolorgir

Notrgir

Shghagir

Typographic form

Handwritten form

== Computing codes ==
Character information
Preview	Ի		ի	
Unicode name	ARMENIAN CAPITAL LETTER INI		ARMENIAN SMALL LETTER INI	
Encodings	decimal	hex	dec	hex
Unicode	1339	U+053B	1387	U+056B
UTF-8	212 187	D4 BB	213 171	D5 AB
Numeric character reference	&#1339;	&#x53B;	&#1387;	&#x56B;
