= Azerbaijani Wikipedia =

Azerbaijani-language edition of Wikipedia

- Website type: Internet encyclopedia project
- Available in: North Azerbaijani
- Headquarters: Miami, Florida
- Owner: Wikimedia Foundation
- Website: az.wikipedia.org
- Commercial: No
- Registration: Optional
- Content license: Creative Commons Attribution/ Share-Alike 4.0 (most text also dual-licensed under GFDL); Media licensing varies

The Azerbaijani Wikipedia (North Azerbaijani: Azərbaycanca Vikipediya) is a Wikipedia in the Azerbaijani language, launched in January 2004. As of 2 October 2026, it has 217,811 articles and 14,600 uploaded files in its content, as well as 352,359 registered users (including 13 administrators). The editorial process is being supported by eighteen bots.

Within the first two years of its creation the Azerbaijani Wikipedia reached 3,000 articles. As of November 2010, the local list of requested articles contained ten entries (seven biographical, two scientific and one unspecified). Pending November 2010 translation requests comprised three English and three Turkish entries.

The categorization is maintained through nine topic categories: culture, geography, history, life, mathematics, nature, science, society and technology. Hidden categories embrace 111 entries. The backlog category contains 14 subcategories.

There are also fourteen portals about architecture, biology, chemistry, history, Islam, geography, literature, medicine, philosophy, Azerbaijani cinema, Azerbaijani military, as well as country-specific ones about Georgia, Turkey and Azerbaijan itself.

Azerbaijani Wikipedia is constantly increasing its number of articles, but at some point in 2015 this number somewhat decreased, returning to values smaller than 100,000.

== History ==
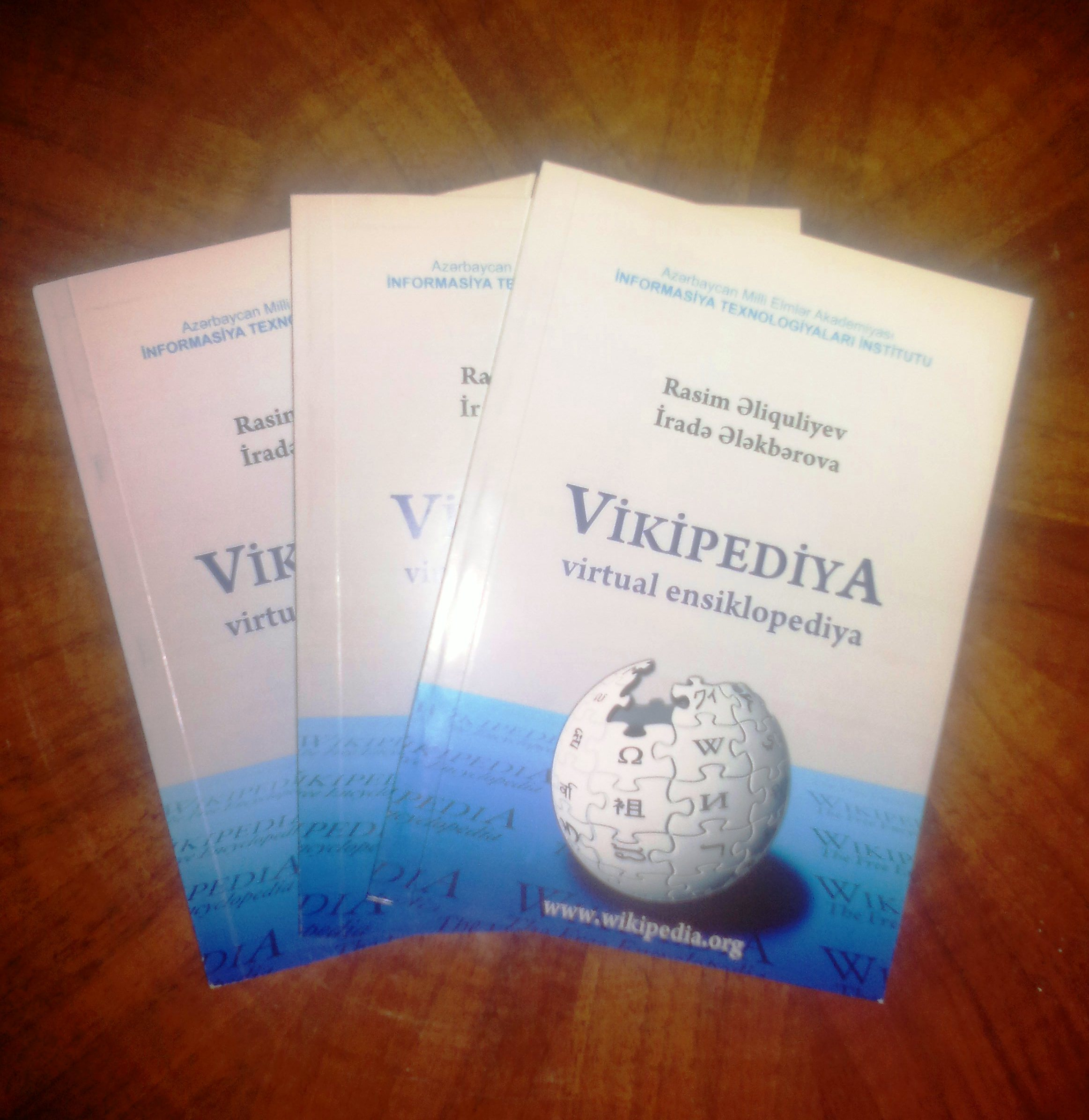
Azerbaijani Wikipedia books

In 2010, Azerbaijani Wikipedia published work from books by professor Rasim Aliguliyev and senior scientist Irada Alakbarova. The book was edited by Alovsat Aliyev.

=== The article timeline ===
- January 2004 – Creation of first section in Azerbaijani Wikipedia.
- 9 March 2007 – 5 000 articles.
- 22 July 2007 – 10 000 articles.
- 29 July 2011 – 75 000 articles (5 819 of them in Arabic alphabet). 75 000th article صفی‌خانلو (in Arabic alphabet) was written by user E THP.
- 17 September 2012 – 90 000 articles.
- 25 March 2014 – 100 000 articles.
- 24 September 2019 – 150 000 articles.
- 10 May 2024 – 200 000 articles.

== Community efforts ==
The first meetup was held in Baku on 6 December 2009. The event was organized in order to establish relations of friendship and familiarity between Wikipedians and a number of other issues – including technical problems and prospects for future development.

In order to solve the problems, an emergency meeting was organized on 23 October 2010 in Baku. About 9 users participated in it.

== Logo ==
Official Logo (North Azerbaijani)

10th Anniversary of Wikipedia

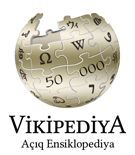
50,000 articles

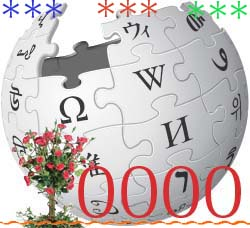
10 000 articles in the Arabic alphabet (non-official)

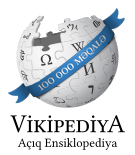
Azerbaijani Wikipedia's 100,000 article logo (25 March 2014)

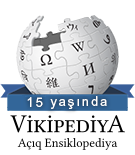
Azerbaijani Wikipedia's 15th anniversary logo (19 January 2019)

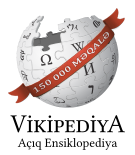
Azerbaijani Wikipedia's 150,000 article logo (23 September 2019)
