= Asturian Wikipedia =

Asturian-language edition of Wikipedia

- Website type: Internet encyclopedia project
- Available in: Asturian
- Headquarters: Miami, Florida
- Owner: Wikimedia Foundation
- Creator: Asturian wiki community
- Website: ast.wikipedia.org
- Commercial: No
- Registration: Optional
- Launched: July 2004
- Content license: Creative Commons Attribution/ Share-Alike 4.0 (most text also dual-licensed under GFDL); Media licensing varies

The Asturian Wikipedia (Asturian: Wikipedia n'asturianu) is the Asturian language edition of Wikipedia started in July 2004. As of 27 September 2026, the Asturian Wikipedia has 141,311 articles, making it the 68th-largest Wikipedia. It also has 152,791 registered users, most of them global accounts created automatically, since the monthly active users amount to 172 of which 6 are administrators. It has 4,551,661 edits. The Asturian Wikipedia ranks 16th among Wikipedias by articles per speaker population.

== History ==
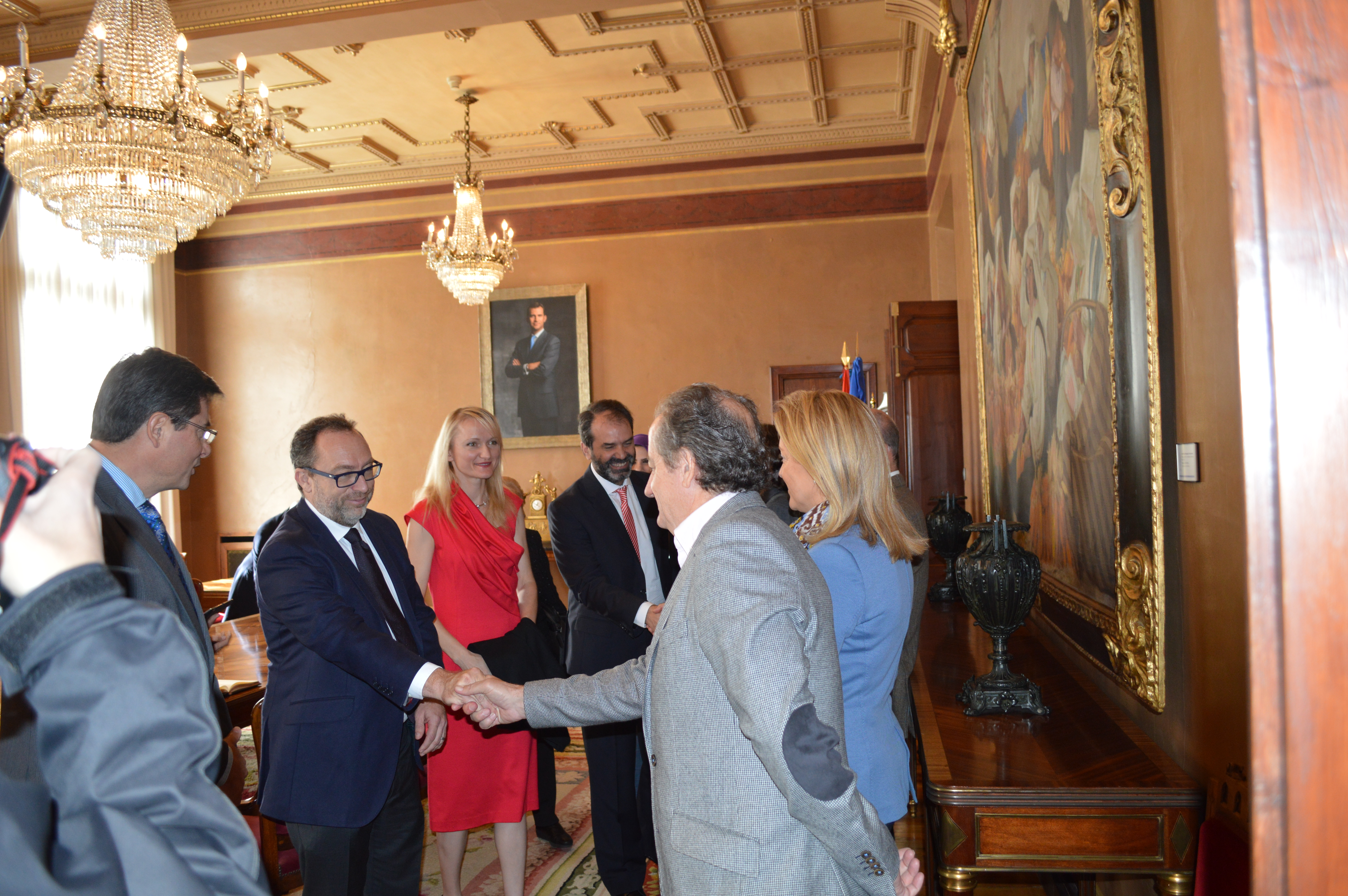
Wikipedia team visiting the Parliament of Asturias.

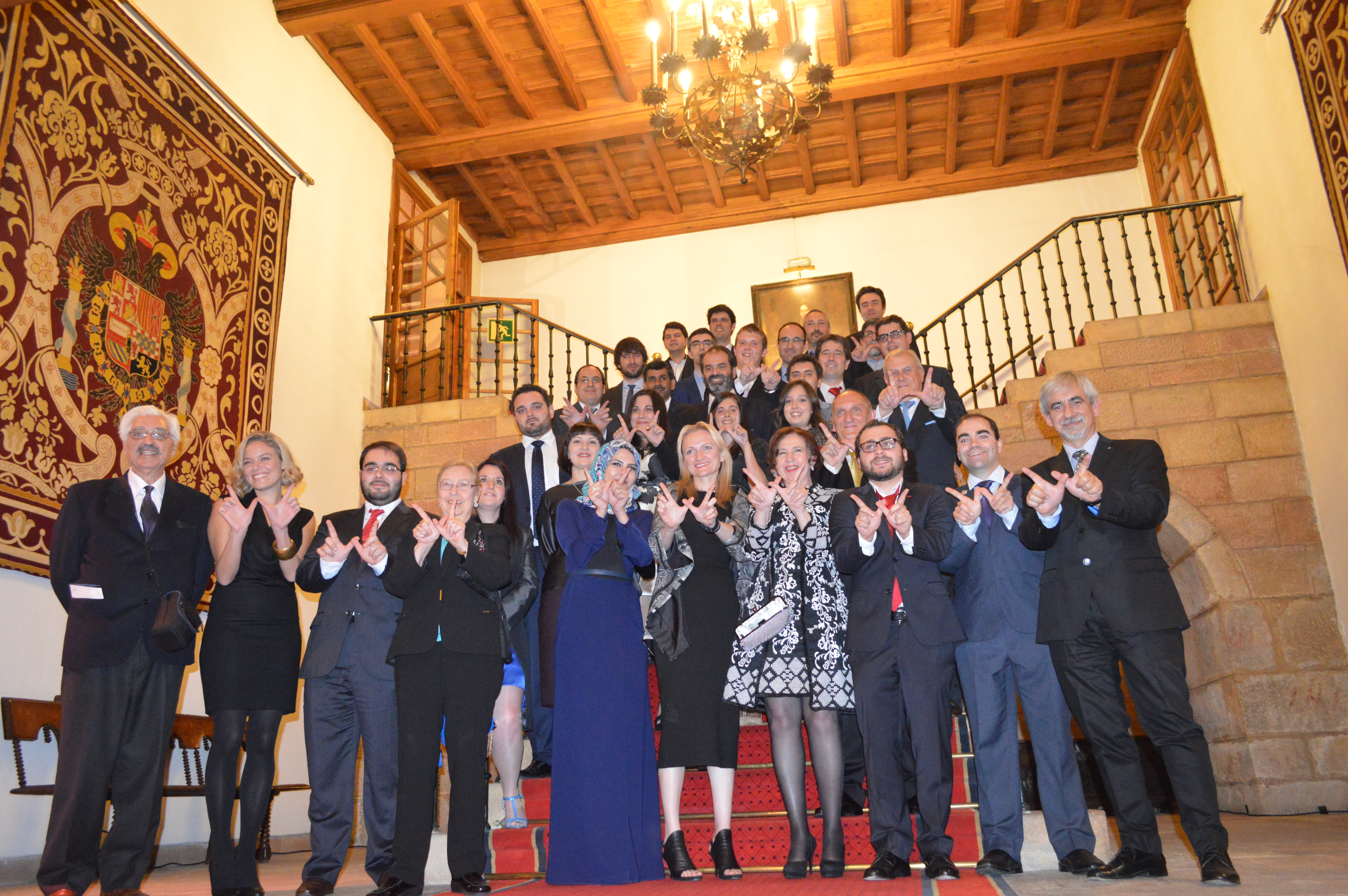
Wikipedians meeting after Awards ceremony.

After its foundation in July 2004, the Asturian Wikipedia reached 1,000 articles on 1 September 2004.

In 2015, Wikipedia was awarded with the Spanish Princess of Asturias Award on International Cooperation. Speaking at the Asturian Parliament in Oviedo, the city that hosts the awards ceremony, Jimmy Wales praised the work of the Asturian language Wikipedia users. The night of the ceremony, members of the Wikimedia Foundation held a meeting with Wikipedians from all parts of Spain, including the local Asturian community.

Old Asturian Wikipedia logo

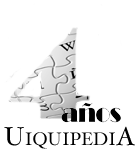
4 years logo (2008)

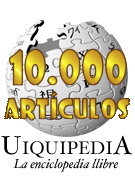
The 10,000th article was created on 20 November 2007

50,000 articles logo

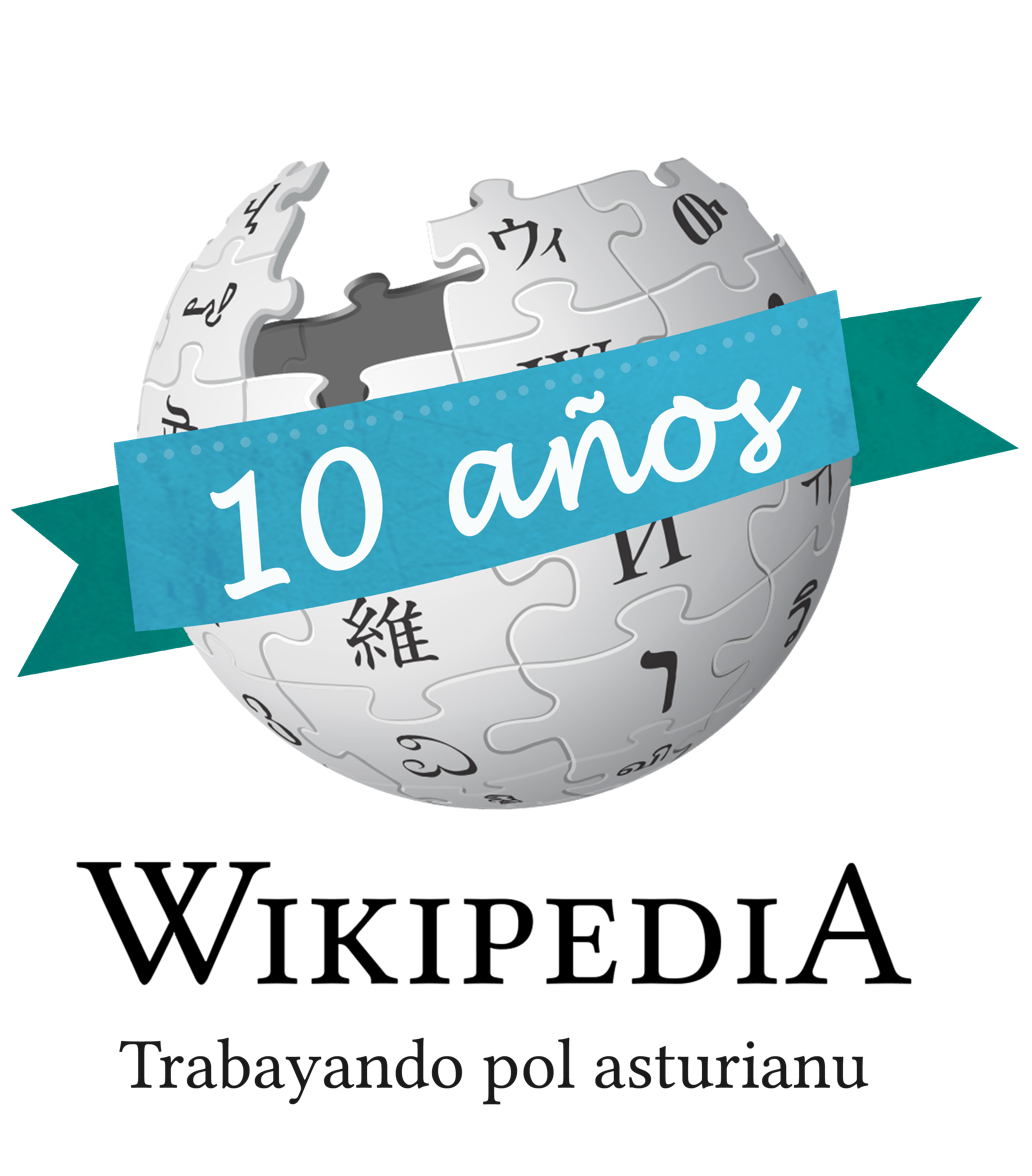
10 years logo (summer of 2014)
