= Jane Hunt =

Jane Hunt may refer to:

- Jane Hunt (Quaker)
- Jane Hunt (American politician)
- Jane Hunt (British politician)
