= Eric Gallager =

American politician

Member of the New Hampshire House of Representatives
- Incumbent
- Assumed office December 2, 2020
- Preceded by: Ryan Buchanan
- Succeeded by: Nathan Giffard (elect)
- Constituency: Merrimack 15th district (2020–2022); Merrimack 20th district (2022–present)

Personal details
- Born: March 5, 1991 (age 35) Concord, New Hampshire, U.S.
- Party: Democratic
- Other political affiliations: Independent (2019–2020)
- Education: George Washington University (BA)

Eric Gallager (born March 5, 1991) is an American activist and politician who is a member of the New Hampshire House of Representatives for Merrimack County since 2020. He was first elected in 2020 after previously running in 2018, and was re-elected in 2022 and 2024. During his tenure, he was known for introducing legislation related to free software. He did not seek re-election in 2026.

== Early life and education ==
Gallager (right) with others during a Wiknic in Boston, 2011.

Eric Gallager was born in Concord, New Hampshire, on March 5, 1991, to Ken and Sharon Gallager. He has a brother, Ian. His father was a civil servant in the state's Office of Strategic Initiatives, and his negative experiences with governor Craig Benson showed Gallager how elections can affect people's lives. Gallager cited this and his participation in peace protests against the Iraq War as reasons he entered politics.

He attended George Washington University, where he earned a bachelor's degree in political science. He interned for U.S. Senator Jeanne Shaheen in 2011 and volunteered for Bernie Sanders's 2020 presidential campaign. He was a student liaison for Occupy George Washington University. In 2019, he changed his party registration to undeclared so he could vote for former Massachusetts governor Bill Weld in the 2020 Republican primary, saying he wanted to "vote against Trump twice if possible."

== Political career ==
Gallager first ran for the New Hampshire House of Representatives in 2018 for Merrimack County's 27th district, but placed fourth in the Democratic primary, behind Carl Soderstrom, and lost to Rebecca McWilliams and Art Ellison. In 2020, Gallager ran for the New Hampshire House of Representatives in Merrimack's 15th district and defeated Republican Michelle McCartney. He would be re-elected in 2022 and 2024 unopposed in Merrimack's 20th district. During his tenure, he focused on promoting open-source technology and free software, as well as improving housing.

He introduced a bill in October 2023 that would establish official pronunciations for "Hampshire" in New Hampshire and "Concord" as HAMP-shər (/ˈhæmpʃər/) and KON-kərd (/ˈkɒŋkərd/), using the International Phonetic Alphabet. He said the bill would not mandate these pronunciations or impose fines or penalties for saying the names differently. In 2024, he introduced a bill to repeal the state's autism registry and destroy its records, which passed with bipartisan support. Another bill he sponsored that became law ensured that people could take their pets with them during emergency evacuations.

He announced that he would not seek re-election in the 2026 election, citing frustration with serving in the minority and the need for a higher-paying job because of financial pressures. He was succeeded in the district by Democrat Nathan Giffard, a scientist and co-owner of a data firm.

== Political positions ==
Gallager has been described as a progressive. During his 2020 campaign for the New Hampshire House of Representatives, he was endorsed by the New Hampshire Progressive Coalition and the Southern New Hampshire chapter of the Democratic Socialists of America. When U.S. Senators Jeanne Shaheen and Maggie Hassan voted against including a minimum wage increase in the American Rescue Plan Act of 2021, Gallager called for primary challenges, saying, "[They] aren’t moderates, they’re right-wing conservatives who need to be primaried from the left." He supports Medicare for All, the Green New Deal, unconditional basic income, unions, progressive taxation, and free education.

== Personal life ==
In 2023, Quorum named him the most active state legislator on X (formerly Twitter), with 8,329 posts from January 1 to July 31, 2023. He shared live sessions of the meetings as well as personal interests, including his art and the video games he played. He has contributed to the GNU Project since 2016 and teaches at Wesley United Methodist Church. He also tutors at Second Start Adult Learning Center. He is engaged.

== Electoral history ==
Electoral history of Kevin Kiley
Year	Office	Party	Primary			General			Result	Swing	Ref.
Year	Office	Party	Total	%	P.	Total	%	P.	Result	Swing	Ref.
2018	New Hampshire House of Representatives	Democratic	410	8.86%	4th	Did not advance			Lost	N/A	
2018	New Hampshire House of Representatives	Democratic	501	99.60%	1st	1,242	65.47%	1st	Won	Hold	
2022	New Hampshire House of Representatives	Democratic	338	99.71%	1st	1,085	98.82%	1st	Won	Hold	
2024	New Hampshire House of Representatives	Democratic	430	99.08%	1st	1,437	99.86%	1st	Won	Hold	
