= Nathan Giffard =

American politician

Member-elect of the New Hampshire House of Representatives from the Merrimack 20th district
- Assuming office December 2, 2026
- Succeeding: Eric Gallager

Personal details
- Party: Democratic

Nathan Giffard is an American politician. A member of the Democratic Party, he is the member-elect for the Merrimack 20th district of the New Hampshire House of Representatives.
