= Ryan Buchanan =

American politician

Member of the New Hampshire House of Representatives from the Merrimack 15 district
- In office December 5, 2018 – December 1, 2020
- Preceded by: Linda Kenison
- Succeeded by: Eric Gallager

Personal details
- Party: Democratic
- Children: 2
- Education: University of New Hampshire at Manchester (BS)

Military service
- Branch/service: United States Navy

Ryan Buchanan is an American politician who formerly served as a member of the New Hampshire House of Representatives from the Merrimack 15 district. Elected in November 2018, he assumed office on December 5, 2018. He left office on December 1, 2020.

== Education ==
Buchanan earned a Bachelor of Science degree in business accounting from the University of New Hampshire at Manchester.

== Career ==
Buchanan served in the United States Navy. On November 6, 2018, Buchanan was elected to the New Hampshire House of Representatives where he represents the Merrimack 15 district. Buchanan assumed office on December 5, 2018. Buchanan is a Democrat. Buchanan endorsed Bernie Sanders in the 2020 Democratic Party presidential primaries.

== Personal life ==
Buchanan resides in Concord, New Hampshire. He is married and has two children.
