= Wikipedia community =

Volunteers who create and maintain Wikipedia

- Wikimania 2026 group photograph at Cité des Sciences et de l'Industrie in Paris, France
- Type: Informal organization of individual contributors
- Purpose: Free, open-content, wiki-based Internet encyclopedias
- Region served: Worldwide
- Services: Authoring and editing Wikipedia
- Website: wikipedia.org

The Wikipedia community, collectively and individually known as Wikipedians, is an online community of volunteers who create and maintain Wikipedia, an online encyclopedia. Wikipedians may or may not consider themselves part of the Wikimedia movement, a global network of volunteer contributors to Wikipedia and other related projects hosted by the Wikimedia Foundation.

== Demographics ==
In April 2008, writer and lecturer Clay Shirky and computer scientist Martin Wattenberg estimated the total time spent creating Wikipedia at roughly 100 million hours. As of April 2026, there are approximately 129 million registered user accounts across all language editions, of which around 633,000 are "active" (i.e., made at least one edit in the last thirty days).

Wikipedia editor demographics (2008)

A study published in 2010 found that the contributor base to Wikipedia "was barely 13% women; the average age of a contributor was in the mid-20s". A 2011 study by researchers from the University of Minnesota found that females comprised 16.1% of the 38,497 editors who started editing Wikipedia during 2009. In a January 2011 New York Times article, Noam Cohen observed that 13% of Wikipedia's contributors are female according to a 2008 Wikimedia Foundation survey.

Sue Gardner, a former executive director of the Wikimedia Foundation, hoped to see female contributions increase to 25% by 2015. Linda Basch, president of the National Council for Research on Women, noted the contrast in these Wikipedia editor statistics with the percentage of women currently completing bachelor's degrees, master's degrees and PhD programs in the United States (all at rates of 50% or greater).

In response, various universities have hosted edit-a-thons to encourage more women to participate in the Wikipedia community. In fall 2013, 15 colleges and universities—including Yale, Brown, and Penn State—offered college credit for students to "write feminist thinking" about technology into Wikipedia. A 2008 self-selected survey of the diversity of contributors by highest educational degree indicated that 62% of responding Wikipedia editors had attained either a high school or undergraduate college education.

In August 2014, Wikipedia co-founder Jimmy Wales said in a BBC interview that the Wikimedia Foundation was "... really doubling down our efforts ..." to reach 25% of female editors (originally targeted by 2015), since the Foundation had "totally failed" so far. Wales said "a lot of things need to happen ... a lot of outreach, a lot of software changes".

Andrew Lih, writing in The New York Times, was quoted by Bloomberg News in December 2016 as supporting Wales's comments concerning shortfalls in Wikipedia's outreach to female editors. Lih states his concern with the question indicating that: "How can you get people to participate in an [editing] environment that feels unsafe, where identifying yourself as a woman, as a feminist, could open you up to ugly, intimidating behavior".

In October 2023, a representative survey of 1,000 adults in the US by YouGov found that 7% had ever edited Wikipedia, 20% had considered doing so but had not, 55% had neither considered editing Wikipedia nor done it, and 17% had never visited Wikipedia.

== Motivation ==
Video articulating the enthusiasm of the Wikipedia community

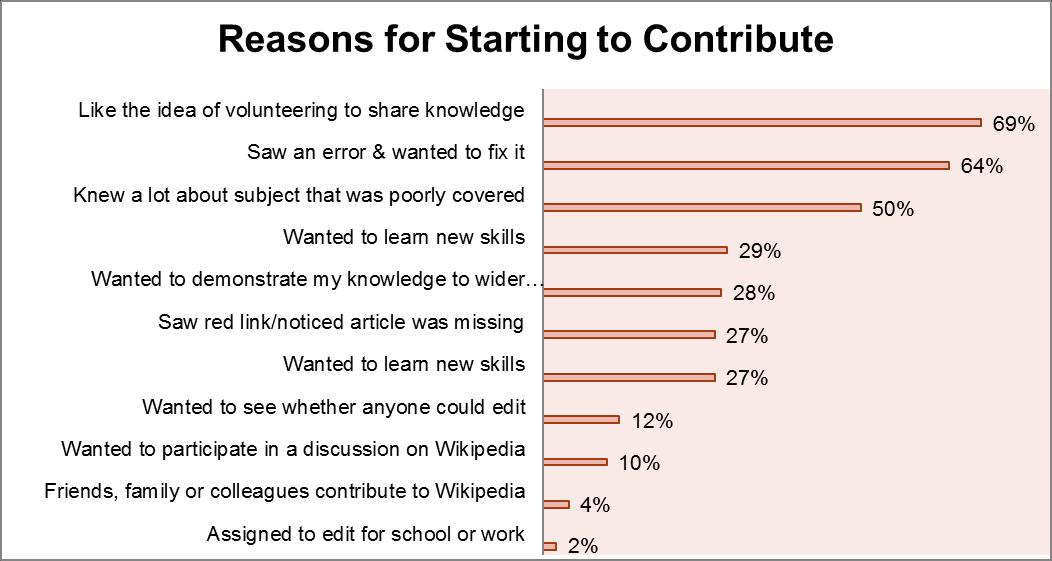
Data from April 2011 Editor Survey showing the top reported reasons for starting to contribute

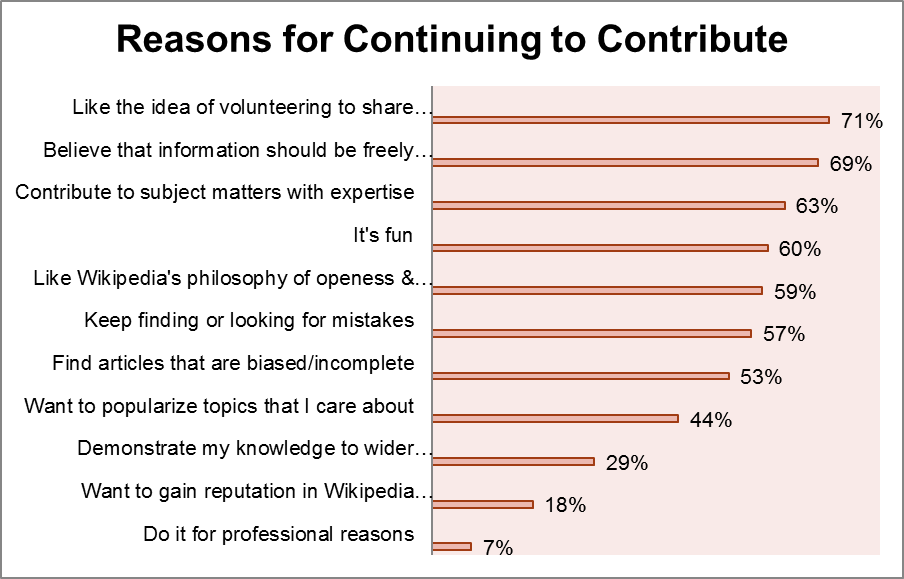
Data from April 2011 Editor Survey showing the top reported reasons for continuing to contribute

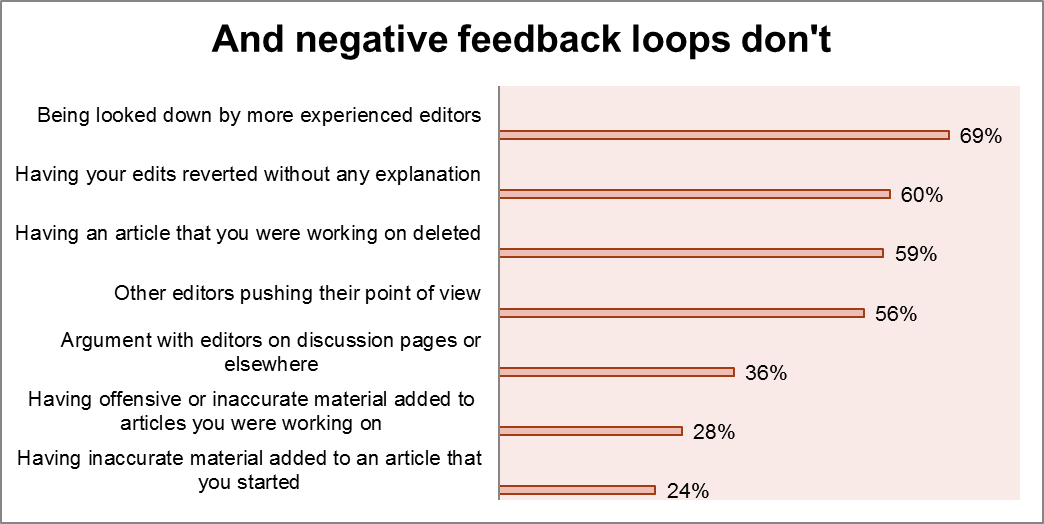
Data from April 2011 Editor Survey showing the top reported experiences that make editors less likely to edit

In a 2003 study of Wikipedia as a community, economics Ph.D. student Andrea Ciffolilli argued that the low transaction costs of participating in wiki software create a catalyst for collaborative development, and that a "creative construction" approach encourages participation. A paper written by Andrea Forte and Amy Bruckman in 2005, called "Why Do People Write for Wikipedia? Incentives to Contribute to Open-Content Publishing", discussed the possible motivations of Wikipedia contributors. It applied Latour and Woolgar's concept of the cycle of credit to Wikipedia contributors, suggesting that the reason that people write for Wikipedia is to gain recognition within the community.

Oded Nov, in his 2007 paper "What Motivates Wikipedians", related the motivations of volunteers in general to the motivations of people who contribute to Wikipedia. Nov carried out a survey using the six motivations of volunteers, identified in an earlier paper. The survey found that the most commonly indicated motives were "fun", "ideology", and "values", whereas the least frequently indicated motives were "career", "social", and "protective". The six motivations he used were:

- Values – expressing values to do with altruism and helping others
- Social – engaging with friends, taking part in activities viewed favourably by others
- Understanding – expanding knowledge through activities
- Career – gaining work experience and skills
- Protective – e.g. reducing guilt over personal privilege
- Enhancement – demonstrating knowledge to others

To these six motivations he also added:

- Ideology – expressing support for what is perceived to be the underlying ideology of the activity (e.g., the belief that knowledge should be free)
- Fun – enjoying the activity

The Wikimedia Foundation has carried out some surveys of Wikipedia contributors and users. In 2008, the Wikimedia Foundation, which, alongside the Collaborative Creativity Group at UNU-Merit, launched a survey of readers and editors of Wikipedia. The results of the survey were published two years later on 24 March 2010. The Wikimedia Foundation began a process in 2011 of semi-annual surveys in order to understand Wikipedia editors more and better cater to their needs.

"Motivations of Wikipedia Content Contributors", a paper by Heng-Li Yang and Cheng-Yu Lai, hypothesised that, because contributing to Wikipedia is voluntary, an individual's enjoyment of participating would be the highest motivator. This paper suggests that although people might initially start editing Wikipedia out of enjoyment, the most likely motivation for continuing to participate is self-concept-based motivations such as "I like to share knowledge which gives me a sense of personal achievement."

A study in 2014 by Cheng-Yu Lai and Heng-Li Yang explored the reasons why people continue editing Wikipedia's content. The study used authors of the English-language version of the site and received 288 valid online survey responses. Their results indicated and confirmed that subjective task value, commitment, and procedural justice affected satisfaction of Wikipedians; and satisfaction influenced an author's continued intention to edit Wikipedia's content.

Also in 2014, a study of edits made to health-related Wikipedia articles conducted by researchers at University College London was published. The study found that contributors were motivated to edit health-related articles to correct errors and bring them up to professional standards, out of a sense of care and responsibility, when it seemed that no one else was interested in a particular article. The most common motivation was the desire to learn and then share this knowledge with others, which became a source of personal fulfillment for many, despite some negative experiences such as hostility and unfriendliness. One participant explained 'When people are hiding behind anonymity, they become a lot less nice. And on Wikipedia, we already have a significant issue with civility problems.' However, this was also seen by others as necessary.

Editors of Wikipedia have given personal testimonials of why they contribute to Wikipedia's content. A theme of these testimonials is the enjoyment that editors may get from contributing to Wikipedia's content and being part of the Wikipedia community. Also mentioned is the potential addictive quality of editing Wikipedia. Gina Trapani of Lifehacker said "it turns out editing an article isn't scary at all. It's easy, surprisingly satisfying and can become obsessively addictive." Jimmy Wales has also commented on the addictive quality of Wikipedia, saying "The main thing about Wikipedia ... is that it's fun and addictive".

Wikipedians sometimes award one another "barnstars" for good work. These personalized tokens of appreciation reveal a range of valued work extending beyond "simple editing" to include social support, administrative actions, and types of articulation work. The barnstar phenomenon has been analyzed by researchers seeking to determine what implications it might have for other communities engaged in some collaborations. Since 2012, the Wikipedia page curation interface has included a tab offering editors a "WikiLove" option for giving barnstars and other such awards to other editors "as a reward for carefully curated work". WikiLove has been described as "an immaterial P2P reward mechanism" that substitutes for a formal reputation-valuing system on the site.

== Media ==
Wikipedia has spawned a number of community news publications. An online newsletter, The Signpost, has been published since 10 January 2005. Professional cartoonist Greg Williams created a webcomic called WikiWorld which ran in The Signpost from 2006 to 2008. A podcast called Wikipedia Weekly was active from 2006 to 2009, while a series of conference calls titled "Not the Wikipedia Weekly" ran from 2008 to 2009.

== Socializing ==
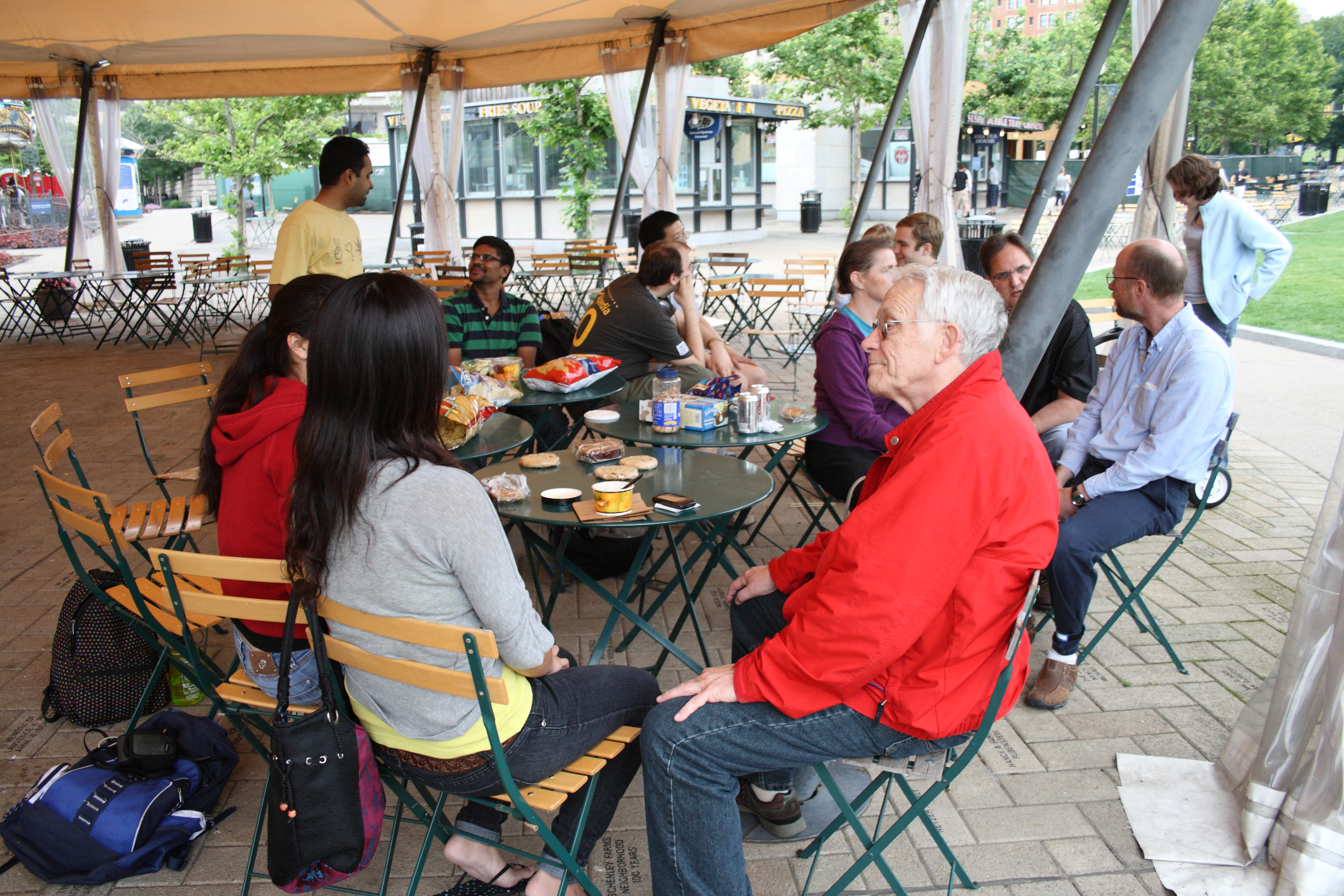
Wiknic 2011 in Pittsburgh

Offline activities are organized by the Wikimedia Foundation or the community of Wikipedia. These include conference and social events like Wikimania and Wiknic.

=== Wikimania ===
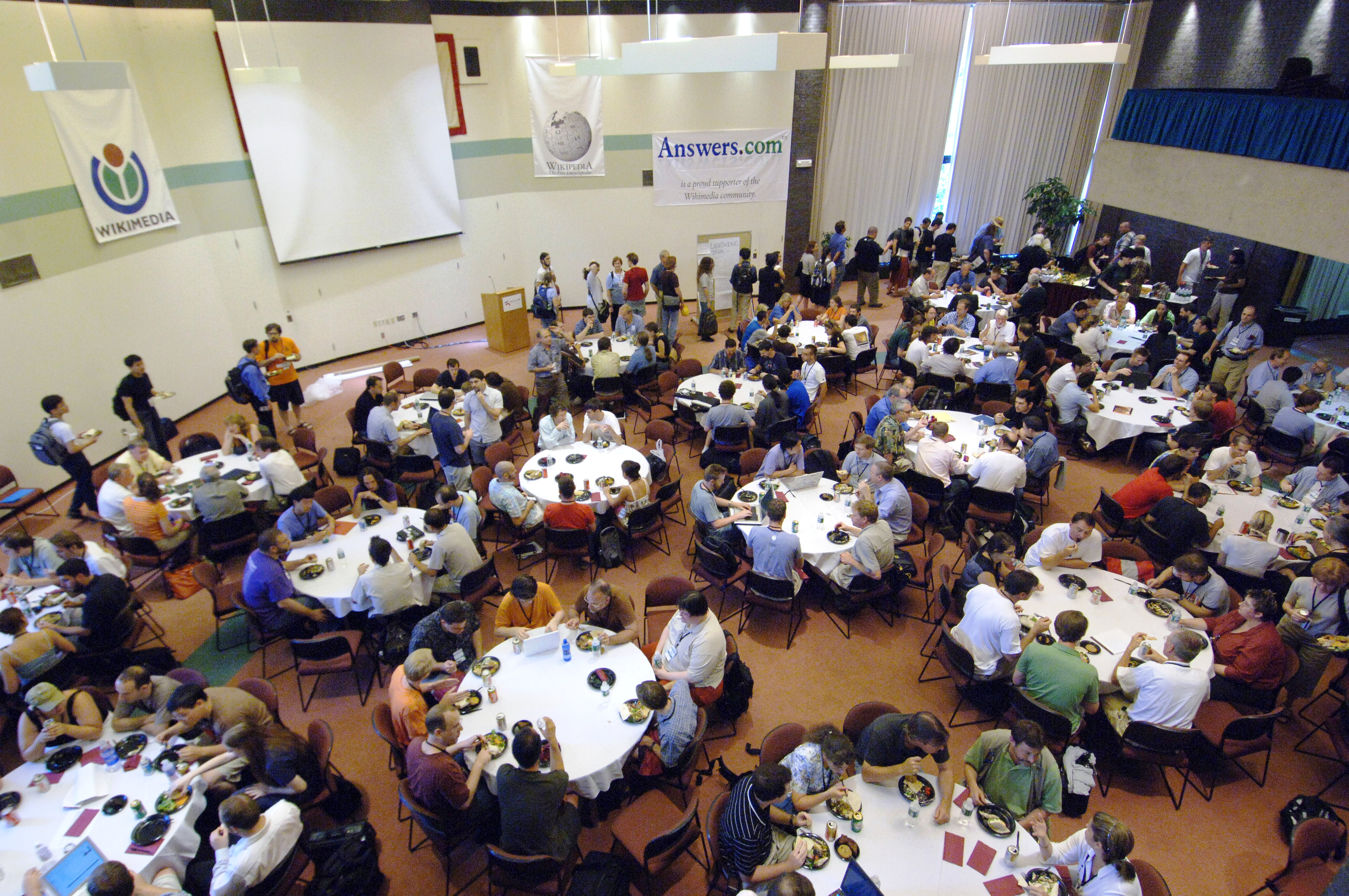
Wikipedians break for lunch at the 2006 Wikimania

Wikimania is an annual international conference for users of the wiki projects operated by the Wikimedia Foundation (such as Wikipedia and other sister projects). Topics of presentations and discussions include Wikimedia Foundation projects, other wikis, open-source software, free knowledge and free content, and the different social and technical aspects which relate to these topics. Since 2011, the winner of the Wikimedian of the Year award (known as the "Wikipedian of the Year" until 2017) has been announced at Wikimania.

The first Wikimania was held in Frankfurt, in 2005. Wikimania is organized by a committee usually supported by the local national chapter, local institutions (such as a library or university), and the Wikimedia Foundation. Wikimania has been held in Buenos Aires, Cambridge, Haifa, Hong Kong, Taipei, London, Mexico City, Esino Lario, Montreal, Cape Town, and Stockholm. The 2020 conference, scheduled to take place in Bangkok, was canceled due to the COVID-19 pandemic, along with those of 2021 and 2022, which were held online as a series of virtual, interactive presentations. The in-person conference returned in 2023 when it was held in Singapore, at which UNESCO joined as a partner organization. The 2024 Wikimania was held in Katowice, Poland, and the 2025 conference took place in Nairobi, Kenya.

=== Wiknics and conferences ===
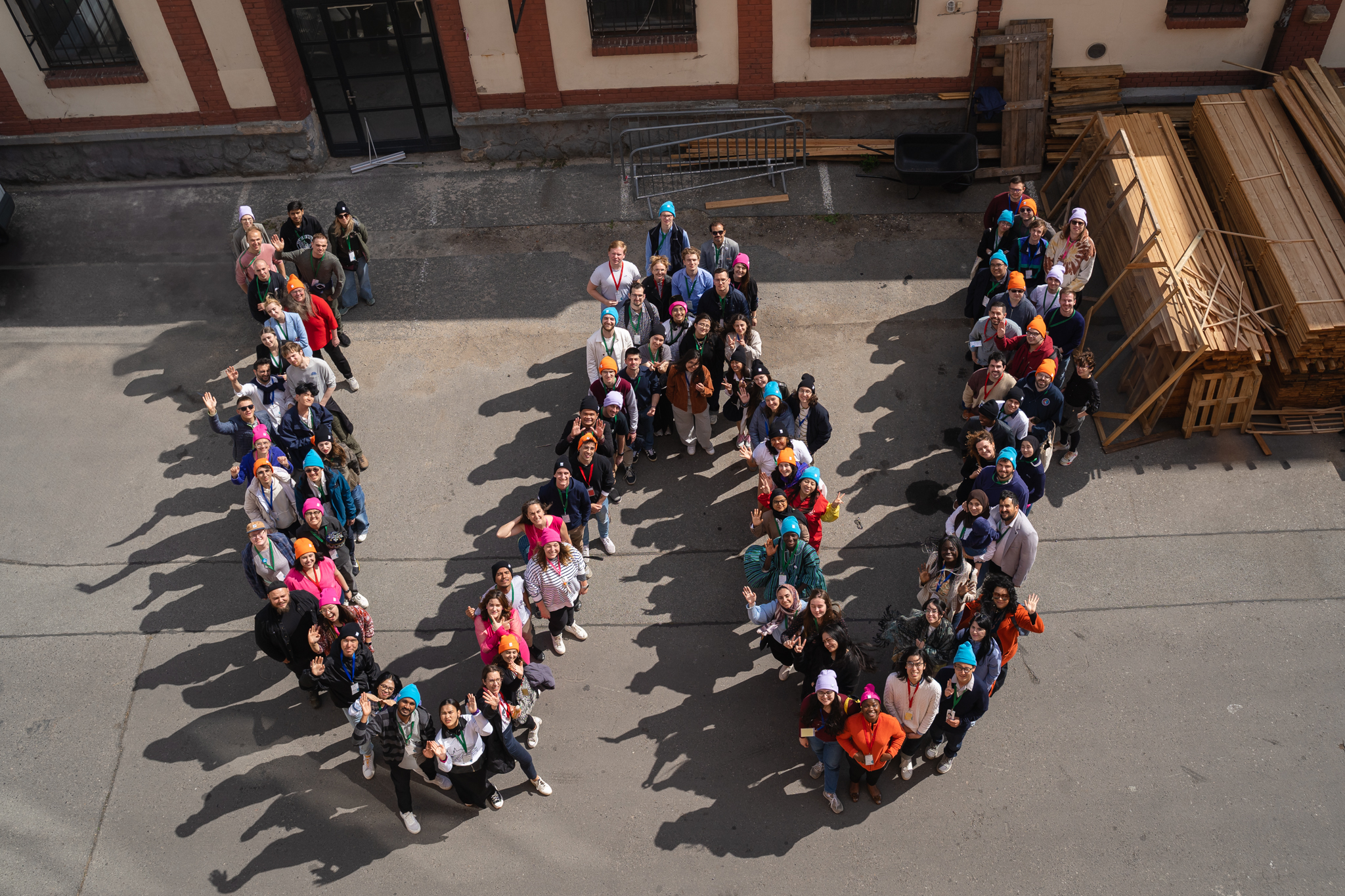
2025 Youth Conference, held in Prague

The annual Great American Wiknic was a social gathering that took place in some cities of the United States during the summer of 2011. The Wiknic concept allowed Wikipedians to bring picnic food and to personally interact.

There is a yearly WikiConference North America organized by and for Wikipedia editors, enthusiasts, and volunteers. The first two events were held at New York Law School and Washington, D.C.'s National Archives Building in 2014 and 2015, respectively. Staff from the Wiki Education Foundation, which co-sponsored the 2015 event, and the Wikimedia Foundation also attend each year.

There is also a WikiConference India, the first of which was held in November 2011 in Mumbai. It was organised by the Mumbai Wikipedia community in partnership with Wikimedia India Chapter. The conference focus is on matters concerning India on Wikipedia and its sister projects, both in English and other Indian languages. WikiConference India 2023 took place in Hyderabad in April 2023.

Additionally, there is Wiki Indaba which is the regional conference for African Wikimedians. The conference includes Wikimedia projects such as Wikipedia, other wikis, open-source software, free knowledge, free content and how these projects affect the African continent.

== Criticism ==
The Seigenthaler and Essjay incidents caused criticism of Wikipedia's reliability and usefulness as a reference. Complaints related to the community include the effects of users' anonymity, attitudes toward newcomers, abuses of privileges by administrators, biases in the social structure of the community (in particular gender bias and lack of female contributors) and the role of the project's co-founder Jimmy Wales in the community. One particular controversy with regards to paid contributors to Wikipedia prompted the Wikimedia Foundation to send a cease and desist letter to the Wiki-PR agency.

Wikipedia's co-founder Larry Sanger (who later founded rival project Citizendium) characterized the Wikipedia community in 2007 as ineffective and abusive, stating that "The community does not enforce its own rules effectively or consistently. Consequently, administrators and ordinary participants alike are able essentially to act abusively with impunity, which begets a never-ending cycle of abuse." Oliver Kamm of The Times expressed skepticism toward Wikipedia's reliance on consensus in forming its content: "Wikipedia seeks not truth but consensus, and like an interminable political meeting the end result will be dominated by the loudest and most persistent voices."

== Recognition ==
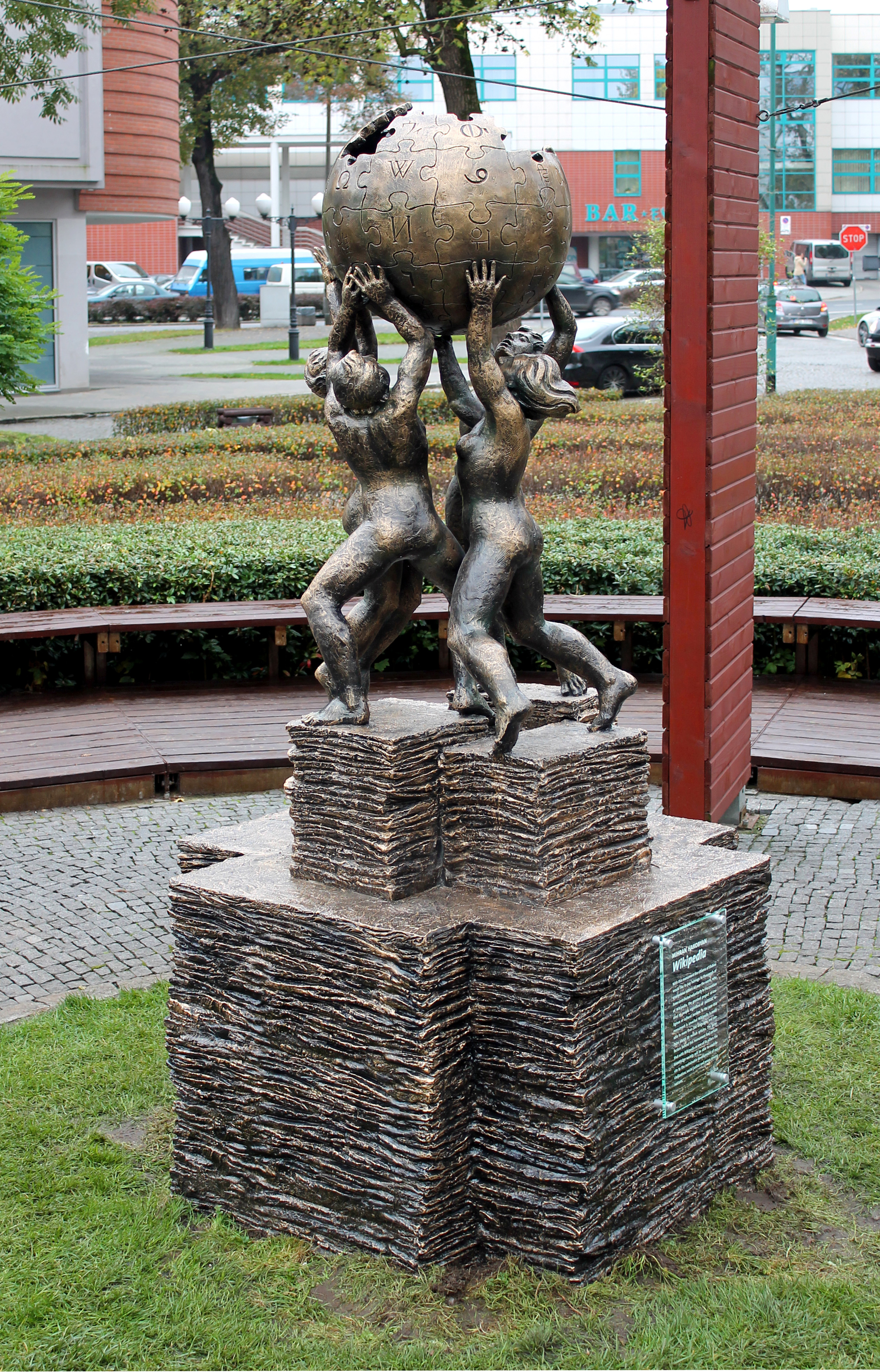
The Wikipedia Monument, by Mihran Hakobyan (2014), in Słubice, Poland

A Wikipedia Monument by sculptor Mihran Hakobyan was erected in Słubice, Poland, in 2014 to honor the Wikipedia community. The 2015 Erasmus Prize was awarded to the Wikipedia community for promoting the dissemination of knowledge through a comprehensive and universally accessible encyclopedia, using a new and effective democratic platform. The prize specifically recognizes Wikipedia as a community—a shared project that involves tens of thousands of volunteers around the world."

== See also ==
- List of Wikipedia people
- Encyclopédistes
- Wikipedian in residence
- Imprisoned Wikipedians
- Wikipedian protester
