= Tomasz Kułkiewicz =

Polish footballer

Personal information
- Full name: Tomasz Kułkiewicz
- Date of birth: 18 April 1978 (age 48)
- Place of birth: Słubice, Poland
- Height: 1.83 m (6 ft 0 in)
- Position: Midfielder

Senior career*
Years	Team	Apps	(Gls)
1998	Polonia Słubice		
1999–2000	Odra Szczecin		
2000–2001	Lubuszanin Drezdenko		
2001–2002	KP Police		
2002	Błękitni Stargard Szczeciński		
2003	Pogoń Szczecin	24	(0)
2004–2005	Znicz Pruszków		
2005–2008	Ruch Wysokie Mazowieckie	26	(0)
2008–2010	Dolcan Ząbki	35	(1)
2011–2016	Ruch Wysokie Mazowieckie		
2012	→ Płomień Ełk (loan)		
- * Club domestic league appearances and goals

Tomasz Kułkiewicz (born 18 April 1978) is a Polish former professional footballer who played as a midfielder.

== Career ==
=== Club ===
In February 2011, he moved to Ruch Wysokie Mazowieckie.

== Honours ==
Ruch Wysokie Mazowieckie

- IV liga Podlasie: 2015–16
- Regional league Podlasie: 2013–14
