= Linda Kenison =

American politician

Member of New Hampshire House of Representatives for Merrimack 15
- In office December 3, 2014 – December 4, 2018
- Preceded by: Jane Hunt
- Succeeded by: Ryan Buchanan

Personal details
- Party: Democratic

Linda B. Kenison is an American politician. She was a member of the New Hampshire House of Representatives and represented Merrimack's 15th district.
