= Mihran Hakobyan =

Armenian sculptor

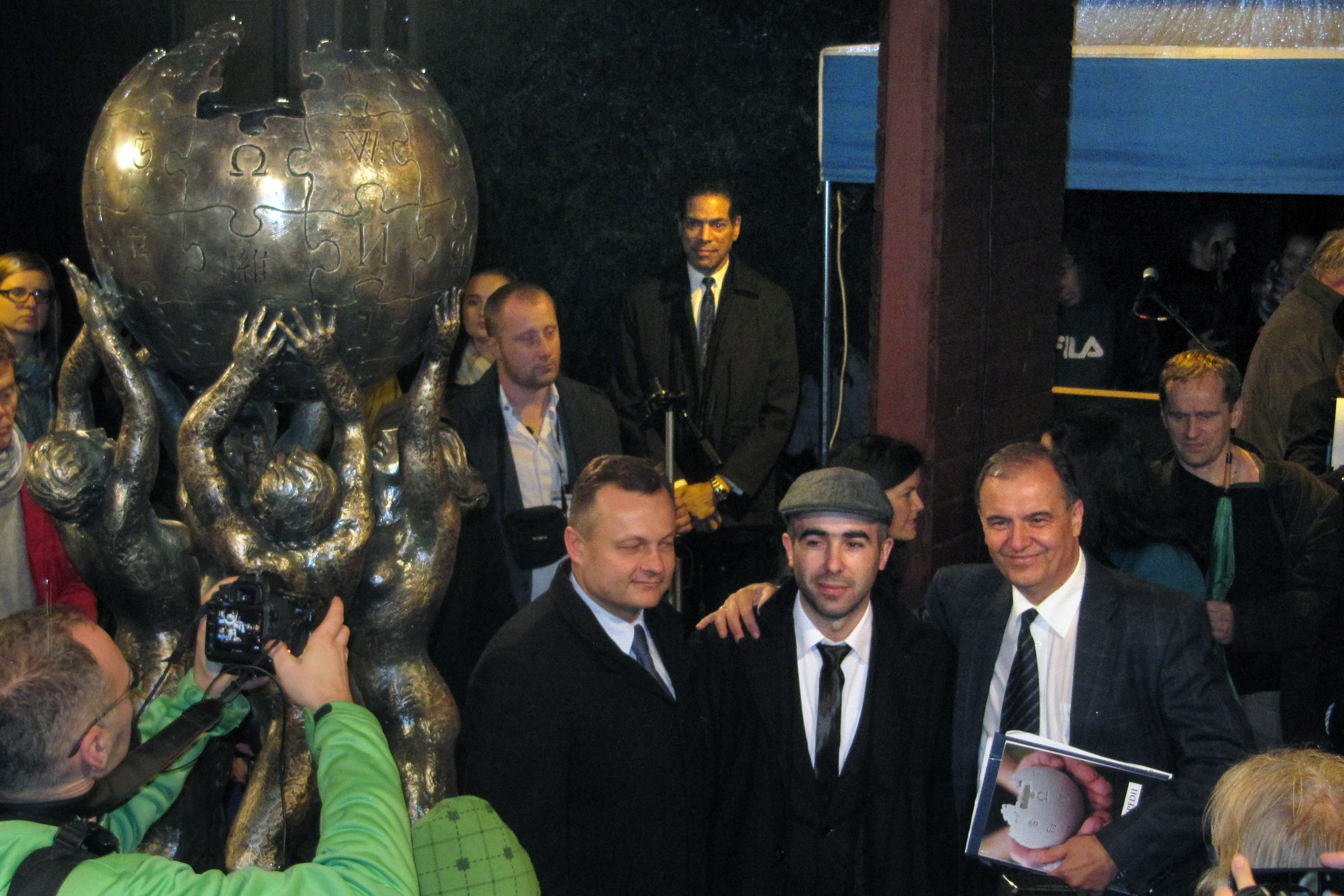
Mihran Hakobyan with the mayor of Słubice Tomasz Ciszewicz and Krzysztof Wojciechowski

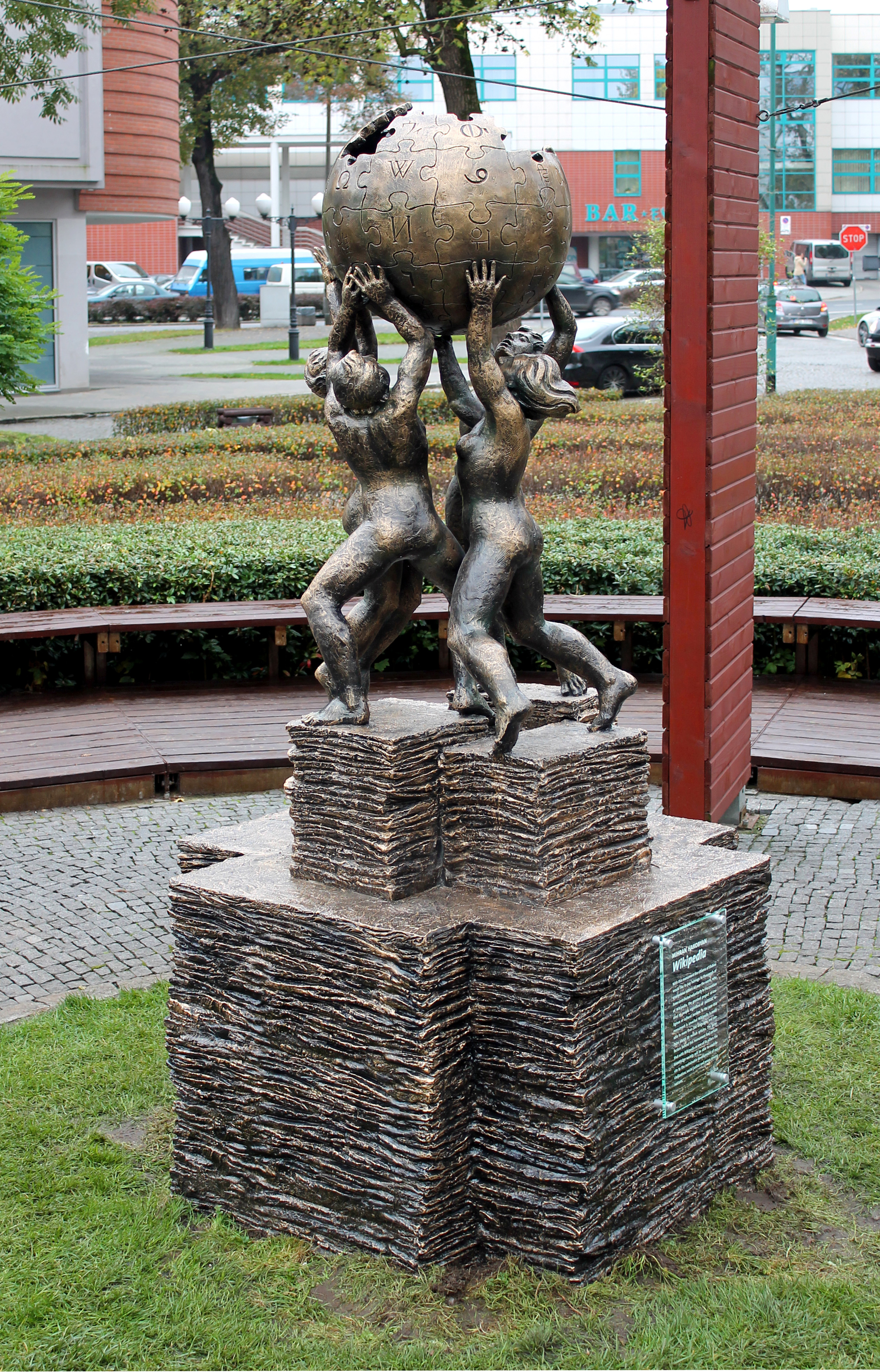
The Wikipedia Monument (2014) in Słubice, Poland

Mihran Hakobyan (Armenian: Միհրան Հակոբյան; born February 18, 1984) is an Armenian sculptor. He created the 2014 Wikipedia Monument in Słubice, the first dedicated to the online encyclopedia.

== Biography ==
Mihran Hakobyan was born in Stepanakert, Artsakh. His father, sculptor Armen Hakobyan (1941–1990), died during the First Nagorno-Karabakh War. From 2000 to 2006, he studied sculpture at the Yerevan State Academy of Fine Arts, graduating with honors. He thereafter worked in his profession in Armenia and Russia, participating in several exhibitions in Stepanakert and Yerevan.

Hakobyan became a member of the Artists Union of the Nagorno-Karabakh Republic in 2001. In 2011, he participated in an international symposium on sculpture in Shusha. From 2010 to 2013, Hakobyan studied Polish Philology at the Collegium Polonicum in Słubice. He received a scholarship from the Polish Kulczyk Foundation in 2012.

On behalf of the Director of the Collegium Polonicum, Krzysztof Wojciechowski, Hakobyan created the Wikipedia Monument in Słubice. On 22 October 2014 the monument was unveiled at the Plac Frankurcki (Frankfurt Square). The monument was sponsored by the city Słubice with 62,000 zlotys.

Though Hakobyan mainly creates sculptures of stone, wood or bronze, he also works with cartoons, especially with plasticine figures. For his cartoon „Зонтик“ (Umbrella) after a story by Leonid Yengibarov he received the audience award at the Short Film Fund in Moscow 2013.
