= Church of the Holy Virgin Mary The Queen of Poland, Słubice =

Church in Lubusz Voivodeship, Poland

Coordinates: 52°20′44″N 14°34′29″E

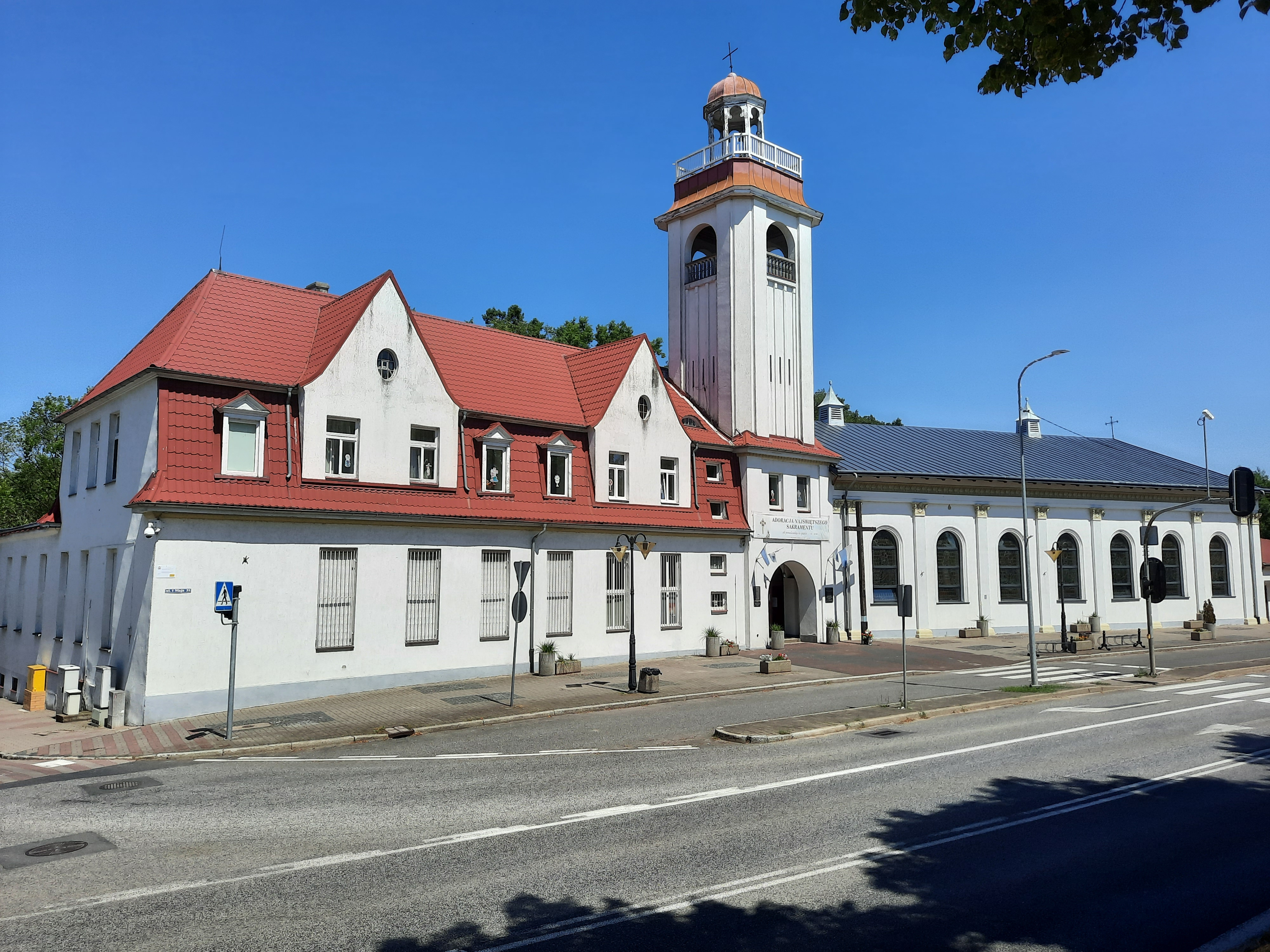
Church of the Holy Virgin Mary The Queen of Poland in Słubice

The Church of the Holy Virgin Mary The Queen of Poland (Polish: Kościół Najświętszej Maryi Panny Królowej Polski) is located in Słubice, a small town in Słubice County, in Lubusz Voivodeship, in Poland.

It belongs to the Roman Catholic Church. The building which dates back to 1775 and served as a rifle range was adapted to its present use after World War II, when Słubice became a part of the Polish territory.
