= Słubice =

Town in Lubusz Voivodeship, Poland

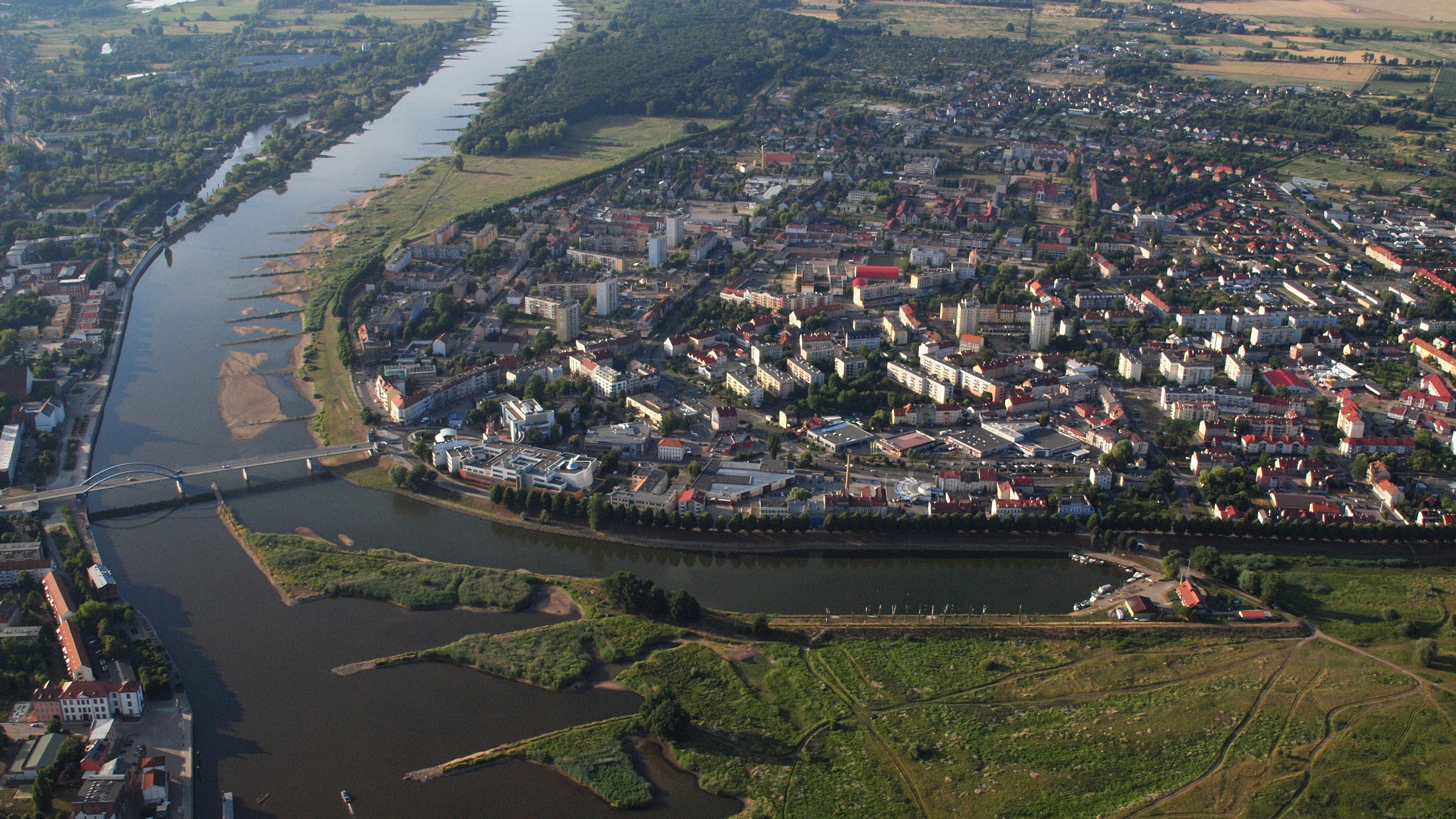
- Aerial view of the town

- Flag Coat of arms

- Location within Poland
- Coordinates: 52°21′N 14°34′E
- Country: Poland
- Voivodeship: Lubusz
- County: Słubice
- Gmina: Słubice
- Established: 12th century
- Town rights: 1945 (1253 Frankfurt (Oder))

Government
  - Mayor: Marzena Słodownik

Area
  - Total: 19.2 km^{2} (7.4 sq mi)
- Elevation: 160 m (520 ft)

Population (2019-06-30)
  - Total: 16,705
  - Density: 870/km^{2} (2,250/sq mi)
- Time zone: UTC+1 (CET)
  - Summer (DST): UTC+2 (CEST)
- Postal code: 69-100 to 69-102
- Area code: +48 95
- Car plates: FSL
- Website: www.slubice.pl

Słubice (Polish: [swuˈbʲit͡sɛ]) is a border town in the Lubusz Voivodeship, in western Poland. It is the capital of Słubice County and the administrative seat of the Gmina Słubice. As of 2019, the town had a population of 16,705, with an urban agglomeration of Słubice-Frankfurt (Oder) counting 85,000 inhabitants. It is part of the historical region of Lubusz Land.

Located on the Oder river, it lies directly opposite the city of Frankfurt (Oder) in Germany, which it was a part of as Dammvorstadt until 1945. It is the seat of the Collegium Polonicum.

== History ==
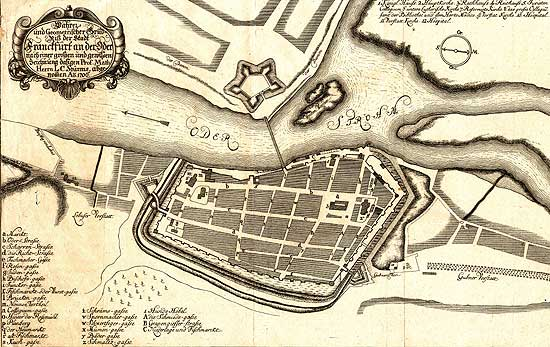
Frankfurt with eastern bridgehead (above), 1701

The name is a modern Polish version of Zliwitz, a West Slavic settlement east of the Brandendamm causeway across the Oder, mentioned in Frankfurt's city charter of 1253. Until 1249 it was part of the Polish Lubusz Land, which since 1138 in different periods formed part of the Greater Polish or Silesian provinces of then fragmented Poland. In 1225 Zliwitz was granted staple rights by Henry the Bearded. The Ascanian margraves of Brandenburg had purchased the Lubusz Land from the Silesian Duke Bolesław II the Bald in 1249. After a war broke out over control of the region in 1319, the area came under the control of the Duchy of Pomerania. In 1319 Wartislaw IV, Duke of Pomerania granted new privileges to the town of Frankfurt (Oder), which today's Słubice was already part of. The area fell again to Brandenburg in 1324. Between 1373 and 1415 it was part of the Lands of the Bohemian Crown (or the Czech Lands), ruled by the Luxembourg dynasty.

In early 1945, a German-perpetrated death march of prisoners of various nationalities from the dissolved camp in Świecko to the Sachsenhausen concentration camp passed through the town.

Słubice is closely linked to its German sister city Frankfurt (Oder), of which it was a part until 1945. The two cities have been forced apart by the drawing of the Oder–Neisse line, which drew the Polish-German border through the city. The two cities share many urban amenities and collaborate on various projects, such as a wastewater treatment plant in Słubice that serves both towns, as well as the Collegium Polonicum extension of some of the Viadrina European University's departments on the Polish side of the border. Furthermore, Słubice is part of a special Słubice-Kostrzyn Economic Zone.

== Climate ==
Słubice has an oceanic climate (Köppen climate classification: Cfb).

Słubice set an all time record for the highest temperature ever recorded in Poland, reaching 40.5 °C (104.9 °F) on June 28th, 2026. The previous record was on July 29th, 1921 in Prószków, where the temperature was 40.2 °C (104.4 °F).

Climate data for Słubice (1991–2026 normals, extremes 1951–present)
Month	Jan	Feb	Mar	Apr	May	Jun	Jul	Aug	Sep	Oct	Nov	Dec	Year
Record high °C (°F)	17.3 (63.1)	19.4 (66.9)	24.6 (76.3)	31.6 (88.9)	32.6 (90.7)	40.5 (104.9)	39.5 (103.1)	38.7 (101.7)	33.2 (91.8)	28.6 (83.5)	20.6 (69.1)	18.1 (64.6)	40.5 (104.9)
Mean daily maximum °C (°F)	3.4 (38.1)	5.1 (41.2)	9.2 (48.6)	15.6 (60.1)	20.1 (68.2)	23.2 (73.8)	25.4 (77.7)	25.2 (77.4)	20.1 (68.2)	14.2 (57.6)	7.8 (46.0)	4.2 (39.6)	14.5 (58.1)
Daily mean °C (°F)	0.4 (32.7)	1.4 (34.5)	4.4 (39.9)	9.5 (49.1)	14.1 (57.4)	17.4 (63.3)	19.4 (66.9)	18.9 (66.0)	14.2 (57.6)	9.4 (48.9)	4.7 (40.5)	1.6 (34.9)	9.6 (49.3)
Mean daily minimum °C (°F)	−2.3 (27.9)	−1.7 (28.9)	0.3 (32.5)	3.6 (38.5)	7.9 (46.2)	11.4 (52.5)	13.5 (56.3)	13.0 (55.4)	9.3 (48.7)	5.5 (41.9)	1.9 (35.4)	−0.9 (30.4)	5.1 (41.2)
Record low °C (°F)	−28.9 (−20.0)	−29.4 (−20.9)	−25.3 (−13.5)	−8.6 (16.5)	−4.8 (23.4)	−0.8 (30.6)	2.6 (36.7)	1.4 (34.5)	−3.8 (25.2)	−9.1 (15.6)	−15.2 (4.6)	−24.3 (−11.7)	−29.4 (−20.9)
Average precipitation mm (inches)	40.7 (1.60)	33.7 (1.33)	39.1 (1.54)	29.8 (1.17)	54.9 (2.16)	50.5 (1.99)	86.5 (3.41)	58.1 (2.29)	48.4 (1.91)	37.0 (1.46)	37.5 (1.48)	40.8 (1.61)	557.0 (21.93)
Average extreme snow depth cm (inches)	3.1 (1.2)	3.5 (1.4)	2.1 (0.8)	0.4 (0.2)	0.0 (0.0)	0.0 (0.0)	0.0 (0.0)	0.0 (0.0)	0.0 (0.0)	0.0 (0.0)	0.9 (0.4)	2.9 (1.1)	3.5 (1.4)
Average precipitation days (≥ 0.1 mm)	16.60	14.40	13.93	11.33	12.97	12.80	13.83	11.90	11.63	13.70	13.87	16.13	163.10
Average snowy days (≥ 0 cm)	7.6	7.4	2.9	0.3	0.0	0.0	0.0	0.0	0.0	0.0	1.0	4.6	23.8
Average relative humidity (%)	86.0	81.9	76.5	68.4	69.4	69.7	71.4	72.4	78.4	83.6	87.9	87.4	77.8
Source 1: Institute of Meteorology and Water Management
Source 2: Meteomodel.pl (records, relative humidity 1991–2020)

== Culture ==
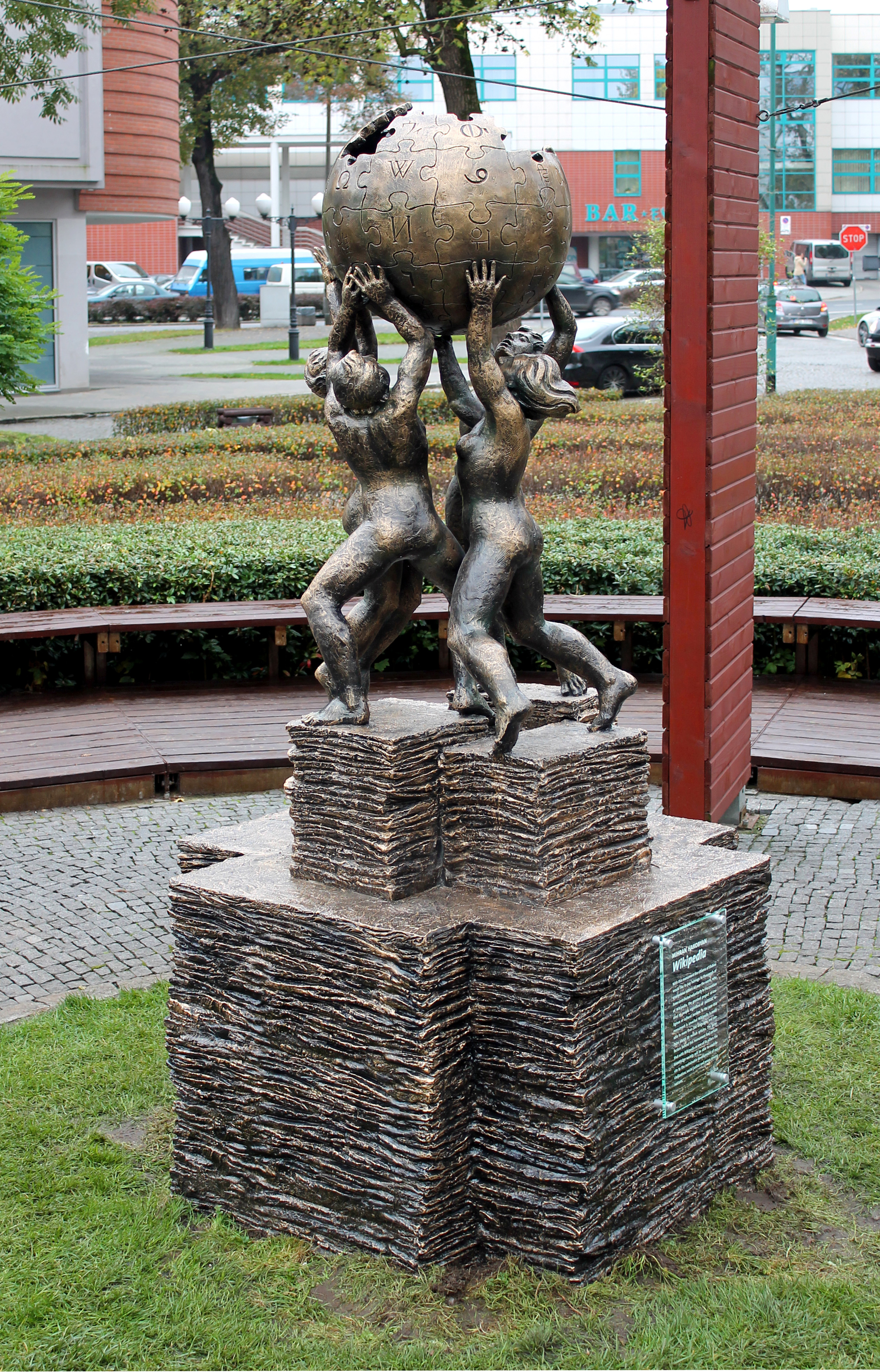
Wikipedia Monument, 2014, by Mihran Hakobyan

Słubice was the setting for the 2003 film Distant Lights (Lichter) as well as for scenes in the 2002 film Grill Point.

On October 22, 2014, a monument to Wikipedia editors by Mihran Hakobyan was unveiled in the town, the first such honoring of the worldwide Wikipedian community.

== Transport ==
The National roads 29 and 31, and the Voivodeship road 137 run through the town, and the A2 motorway, part of the European route E30, runs nearby, south of the town.

== Cuisine ==
The officially protected traditional food of Słubice and the county is schab tradycyjny słubicki, a local type of smoked schab (pork loin), a popular traditional Christmas dish in the area (as designated by the Ministry of Agriculture and Rural Development of Poland).

== Sports ==
Polonia Słubice football club is based in Słubice. Polonia's home ground is the OSiR Stadium.

== Twin towns – sister cities ==
See twin towns of Gmina Słubice.

== Notable people ==
- Sara James (born 2008), singer-songwriter
- Tomasz Kułkiewicz (born 1978), footballer

== Gallery ==
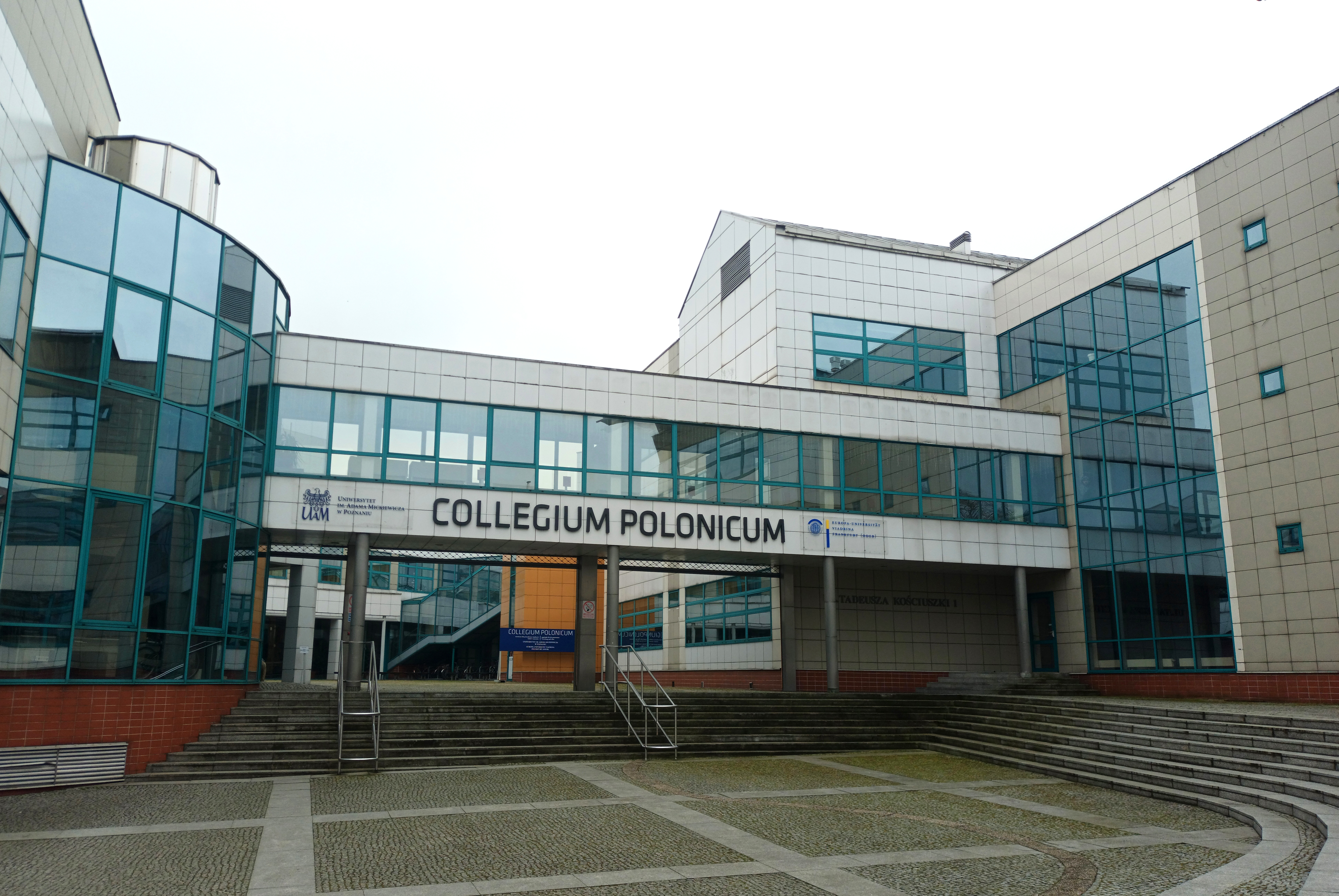
Collegium Polonicum

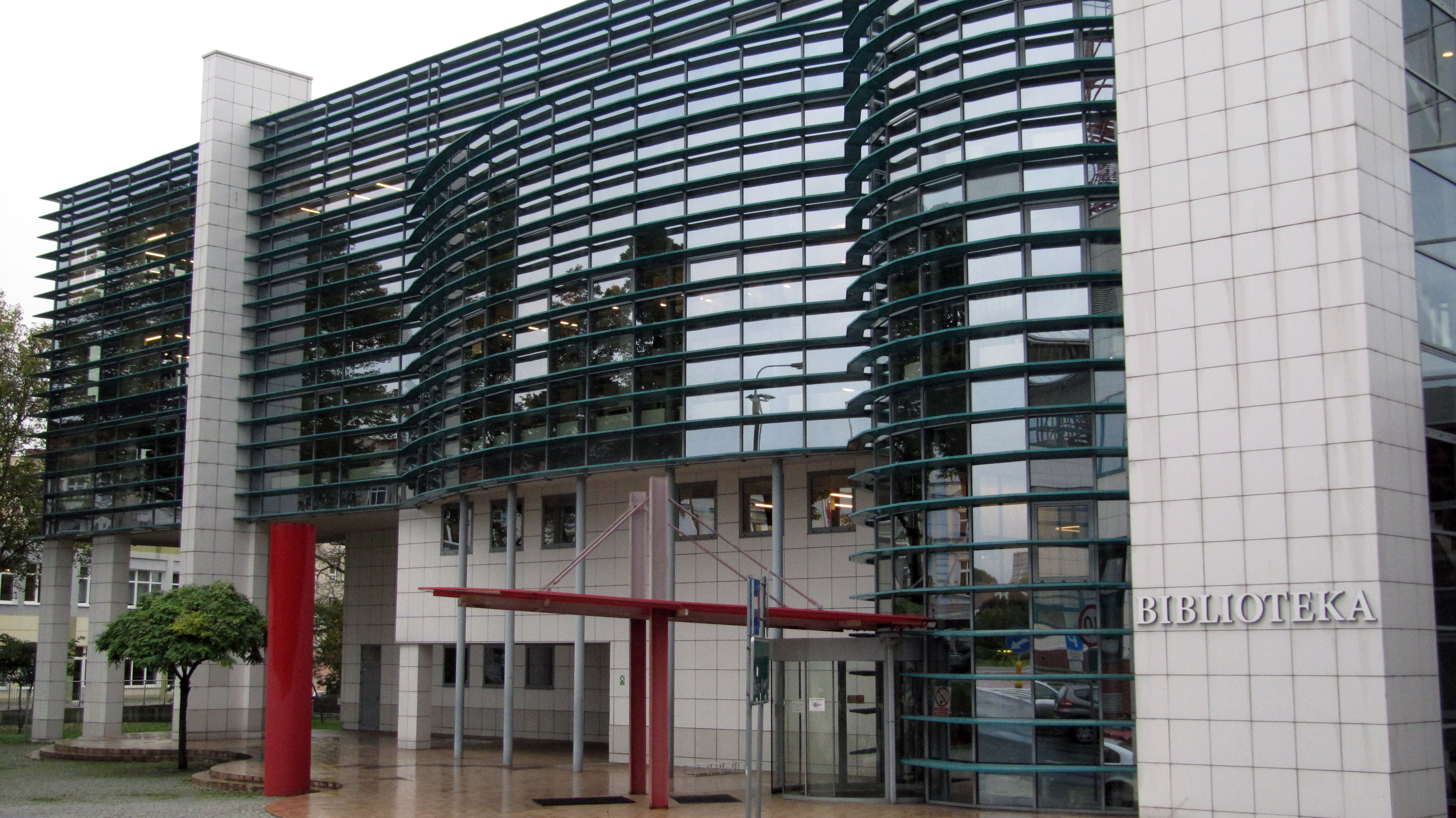
Library of the Collegium Polonicum

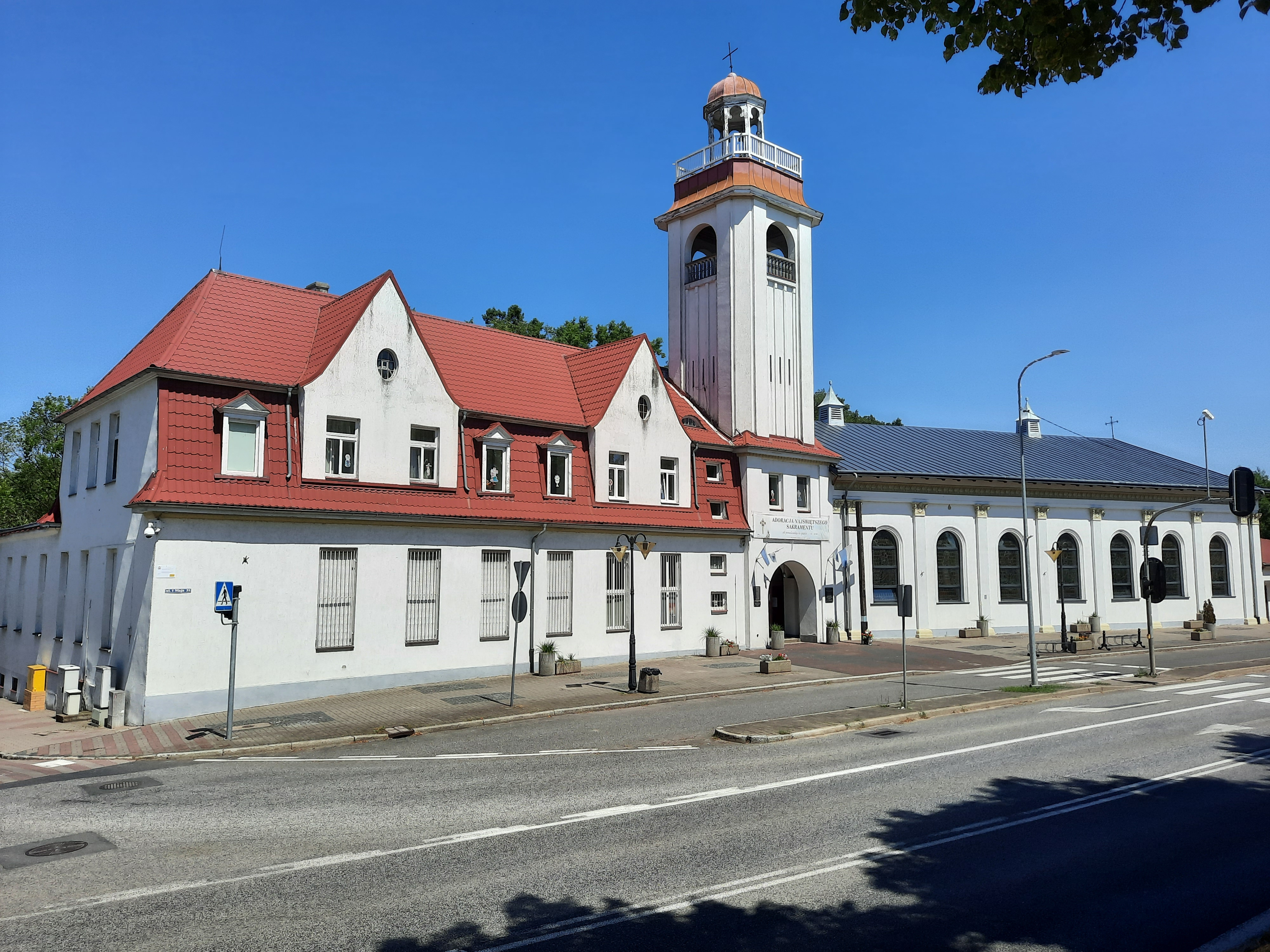
Church of the Holy Virgin Mary The Queen of Poland

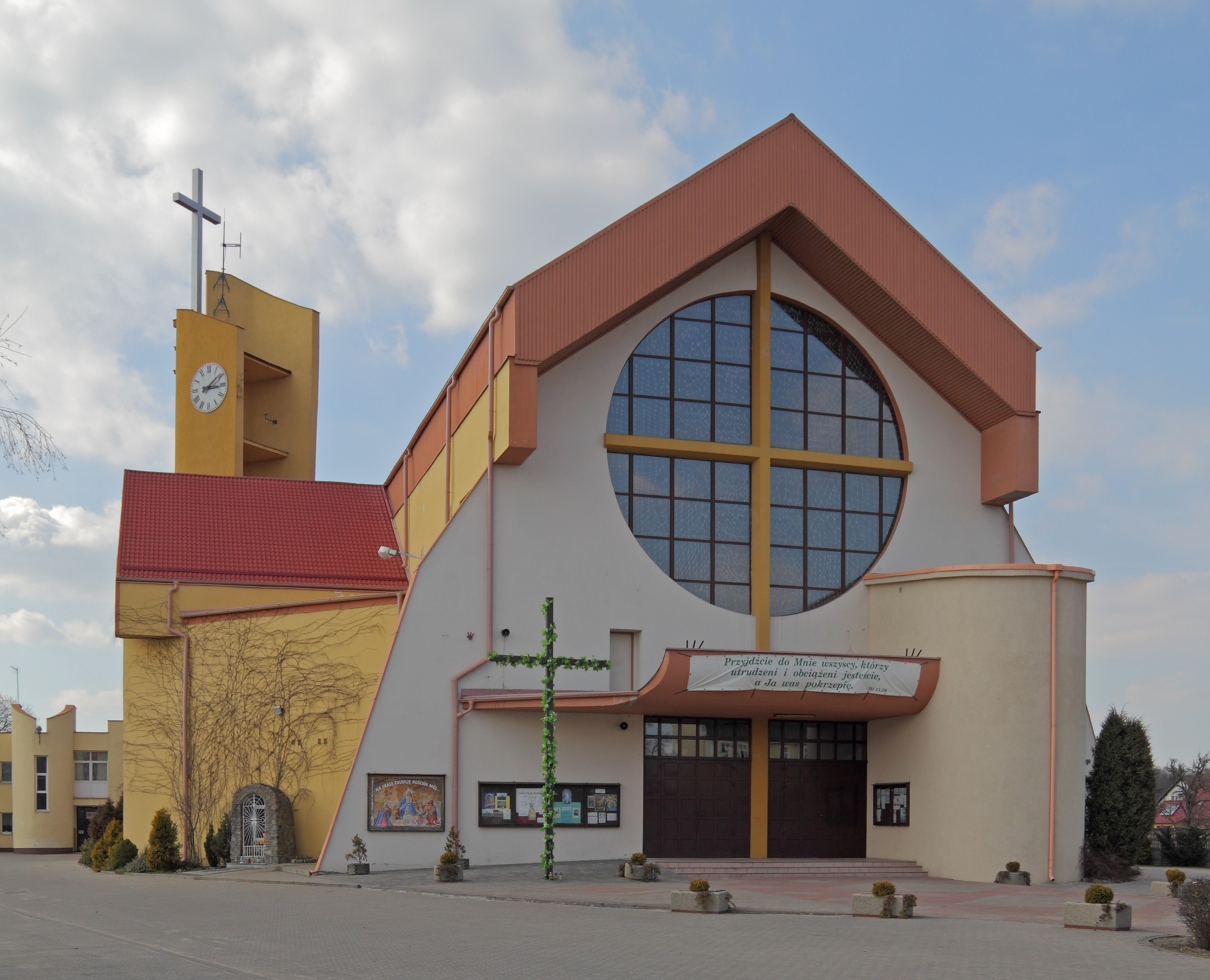
Holy Spirit Church
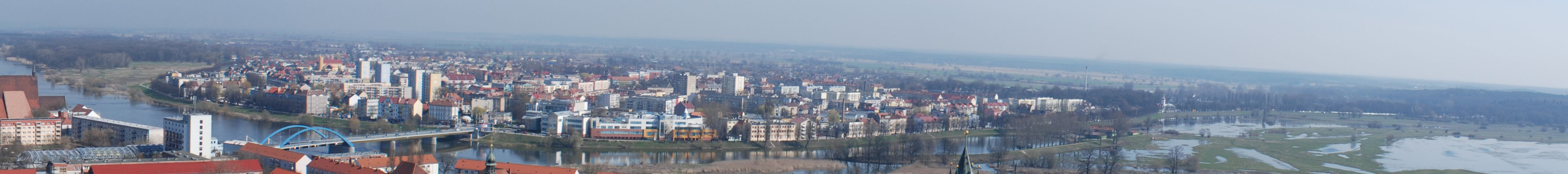
150°-panorama of Słubice city centre
