= Wikipedia Monument =

Statue in Poland honoring Wikipedia editors

- Pomnik Wikipedii (Polish)
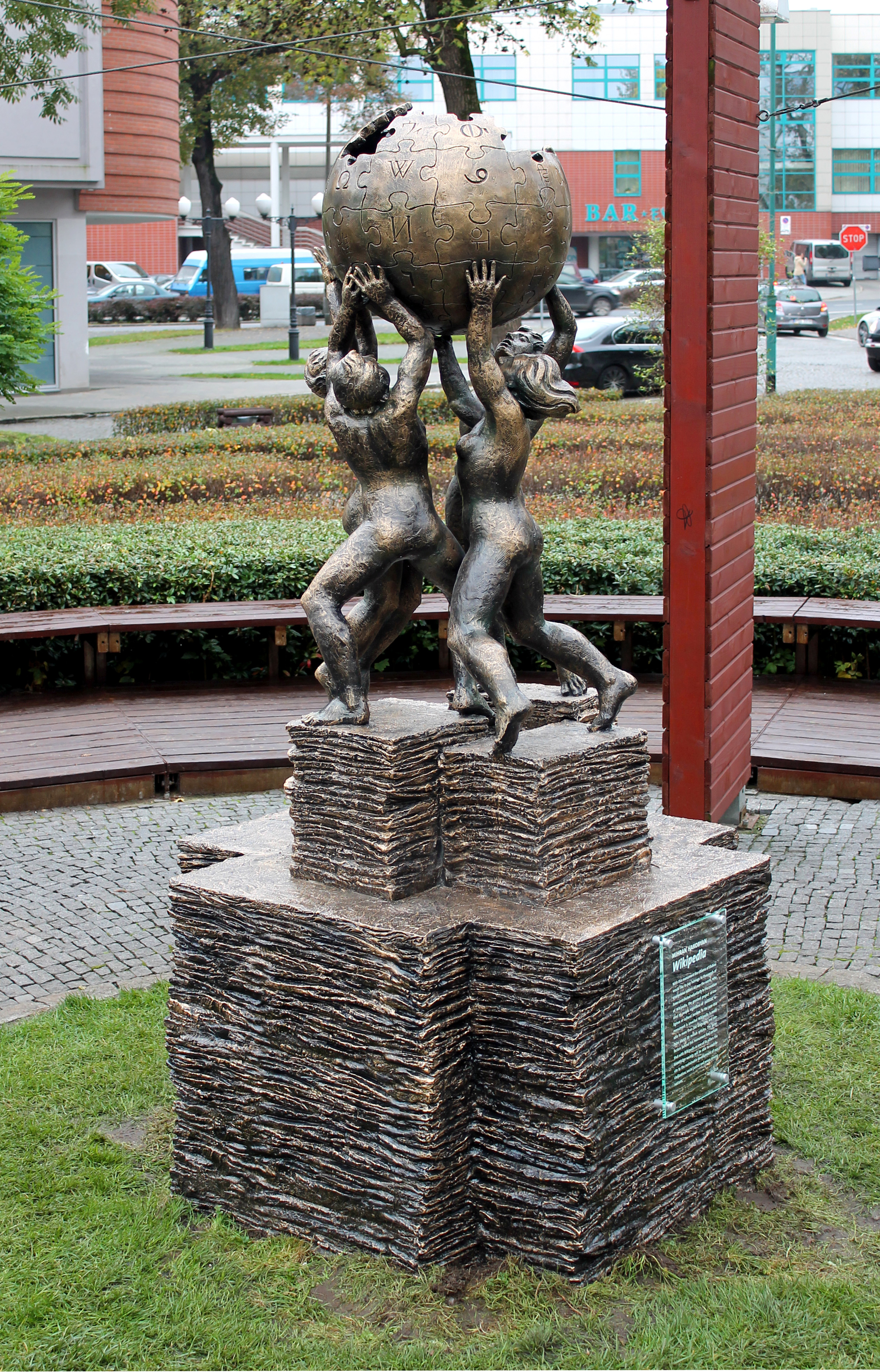
- The sculpture in 2014
- Artist: Mihran Hakobyan
- Year: 22 October 2014
- Type: Sculpture
- Medium: Fiberglass; resin
- Subject: Wikipedia community
- Dimensions: 250 cm × 60 cm × 60 cm (98 in × 24 in × 24 in)
- Location: Słubice, Poland; 52°20′57″N 14°33′37″E
- Owner: Słubice regional authorities

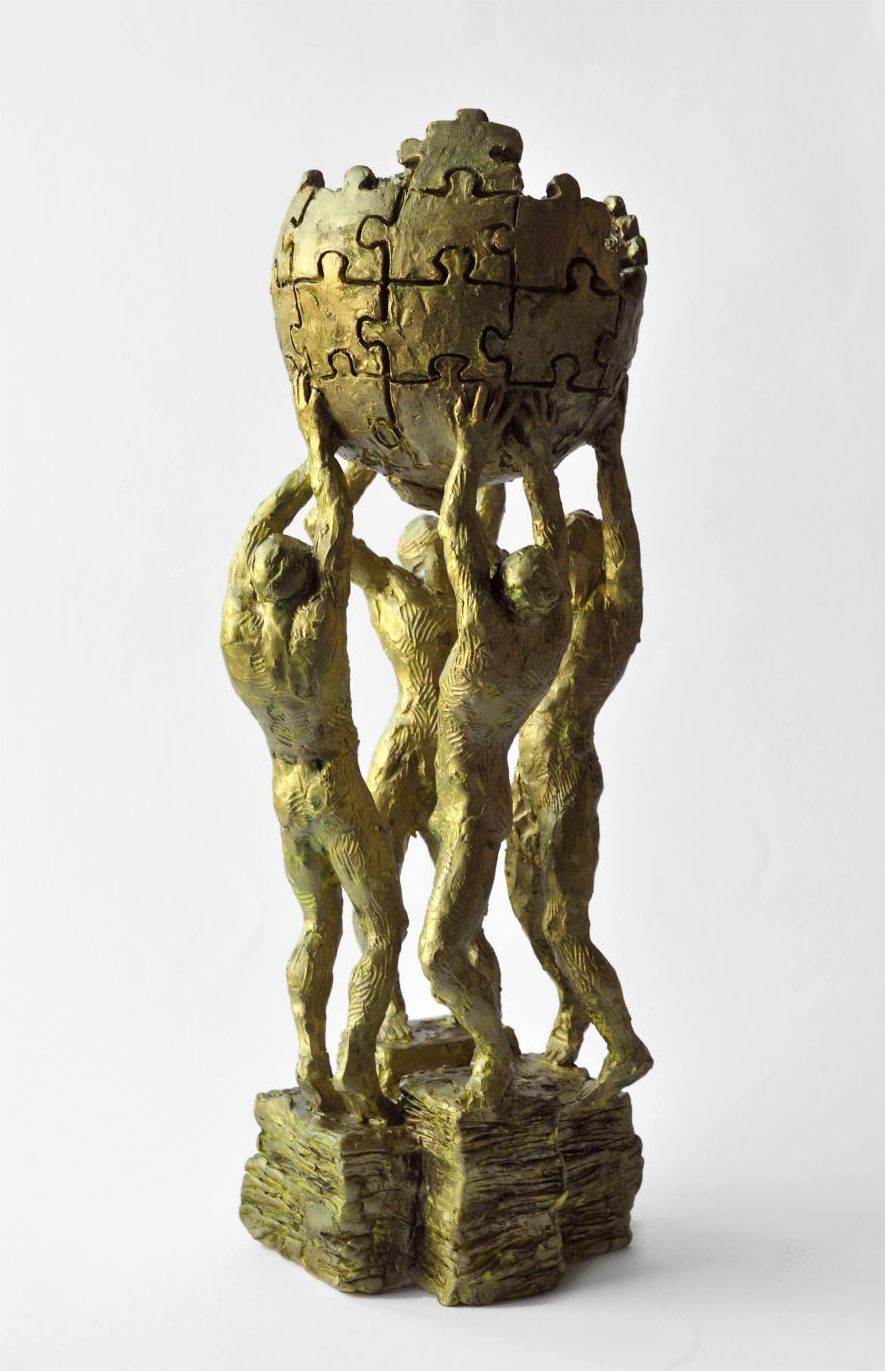
Mihran Hakobyan's original maquette (preliminary model) for the sculpture

The Wikipedia Monument (Polish: Pomnik Wikipedii), located in Słubice, Poland, is a statue designed by Armenian sculptor Mihran Hakobyan honoring Wikipedia contributors. It was unveiled in Frankfurt Square (Plac Frankfurcki) on 22 October 2014 in a ceremony that included representatives from both local Wikimedia chapters and the Wikimedia Foundation.

== Description ==
The monument in Słubice depicts four nude figures holding aloft a globe based on the Wikipedia logo, reaching over two metres (6 ft 7 in) up. The fiber-and-resin statue was designed by Armenian-born artist Mihran Hakobyan, who graduated from the local Collegium Polonicum. It cost about 50,000 złoty (approximately $13,500; €11,700) and was funded by Słubice regional authorities. The monument has the following inscription:

With this monument the citizens of Słubice would like to pay homage to thousands of anonymous editors all over the world, who have contributed voluntarily to the creation of Wikipedia, the greatest project co-created by people regardless of political, religious or cultural borders. In the year this monument is unveiled Wikipedia is available in more than 280 languages and contains about 30 million articles. The benefactors behind this monument feel certain that with Wikipedia as one of its pillars the knowledge society will be able to contribute to the sustainable development of our civilization, social justice and peace among nations.

== History ==
The monument was suggested around 2010 by Krzysztof Wojciechowski, a university professor and director of the Collegium Polonicum in Słubice. Polish Wikipedia is a popular website in Poland and, with over a million articles, was the 10th-largest Wikipedia at the time of construction. According to Piotr Łuczyński, deputy mayor, the memorial "will highlight the town's importance as an academic centre". A Wikimedia Polska representative stated that the organization hopes that this project will "raise awareness of the website and encourage people to contribute."

It was unveiled on 22 October 2014, on the Plac Frankfurcki, becoming the world's first monument to the online encyclopedia. Representatives from the Wikimedia Foundation and the Wikimedia chapters for Poland and Germany (Wikimedia Polska and Wikimedia Deutschland, respectively) attended the dedication ceremony. Dariusz Jemielniak, a professor of management, Wikimedia activist, and author of the 2014 book Common Knowledge? An Ethnography of Wikipedia, delivered an opening ceremony address.

When Wikipedia started back in 2001 I have to say that I never imagined a day when Wikipedia would be honored with a monument – we write about them, we photograph them with our Wiki Loves Monuments competition, and now we have a monument of our own. It is a truly special and exciting day, and one that I hope shines the spotlight on the thousands of Wikimedians who edit Wikipedia and make it the source of free knowledge it has come to be. I look forward to visiting Słubice one day to see the monument for myself and perhaps meeting some of those involved in the project.

— Jimmy Wales, the co-founder of Wikipedia, on the occasion of the unveiling

== See also ==
- 2014 in art
