= Collegium Polonicum =

Coordinates: 52°24′28″N 16°54′56″E

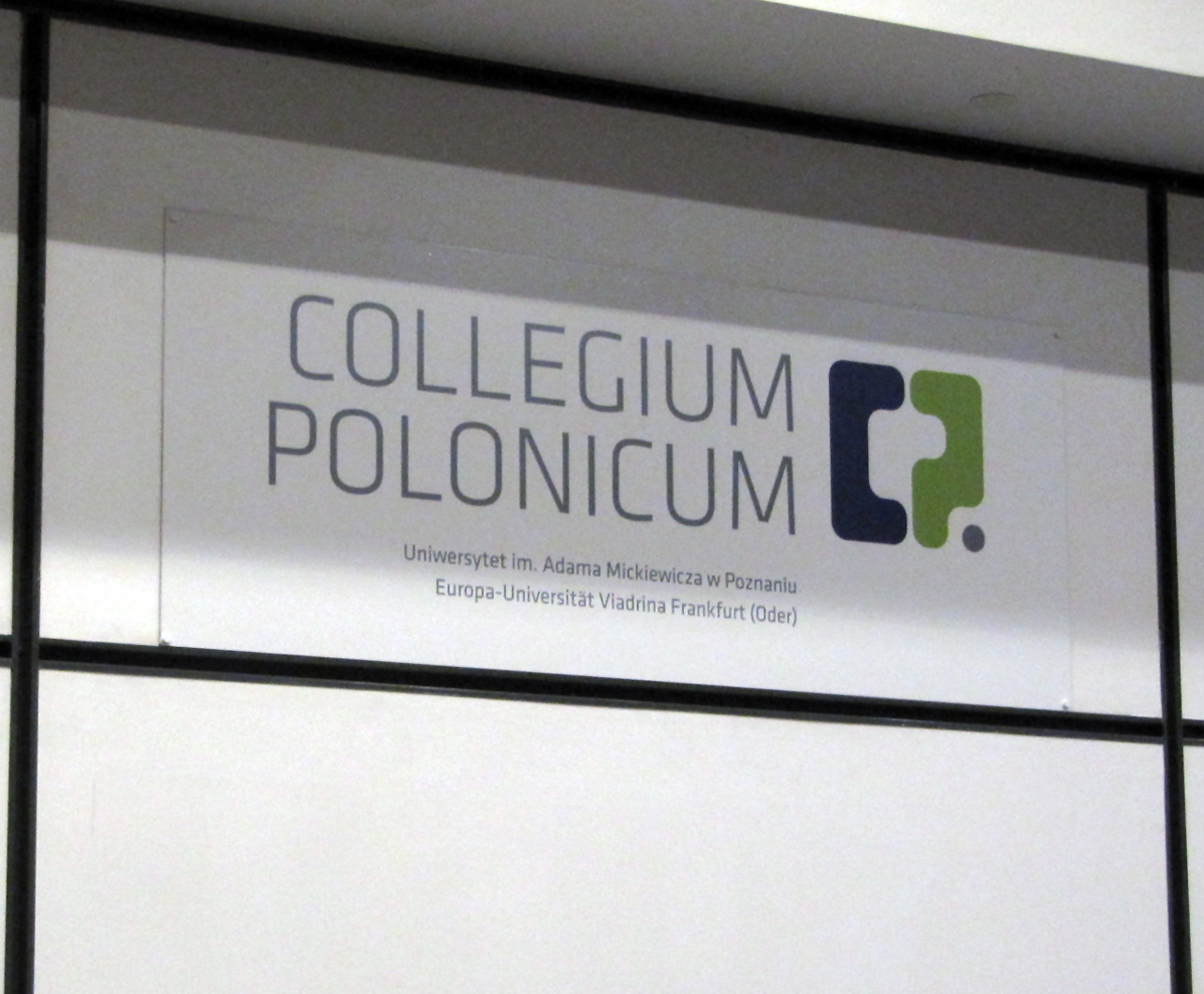
- Established: 1992
- Administrative staff: 27 (55 with library, technical and administrative staff)
- Students: 1,680 (2004), 760 (2016).
- Location: Słubice, Lubusz Voivodeship, Poland
- Management Board: Administrative Director Krzysztof Wojciechowski, A. Mickiewicz University Deputy Rector with responsibility for CP Tadeusz Wallas and Viadrina Vice President with responsibility for CP Janine Nuyken
- Website: cp.edu.pl

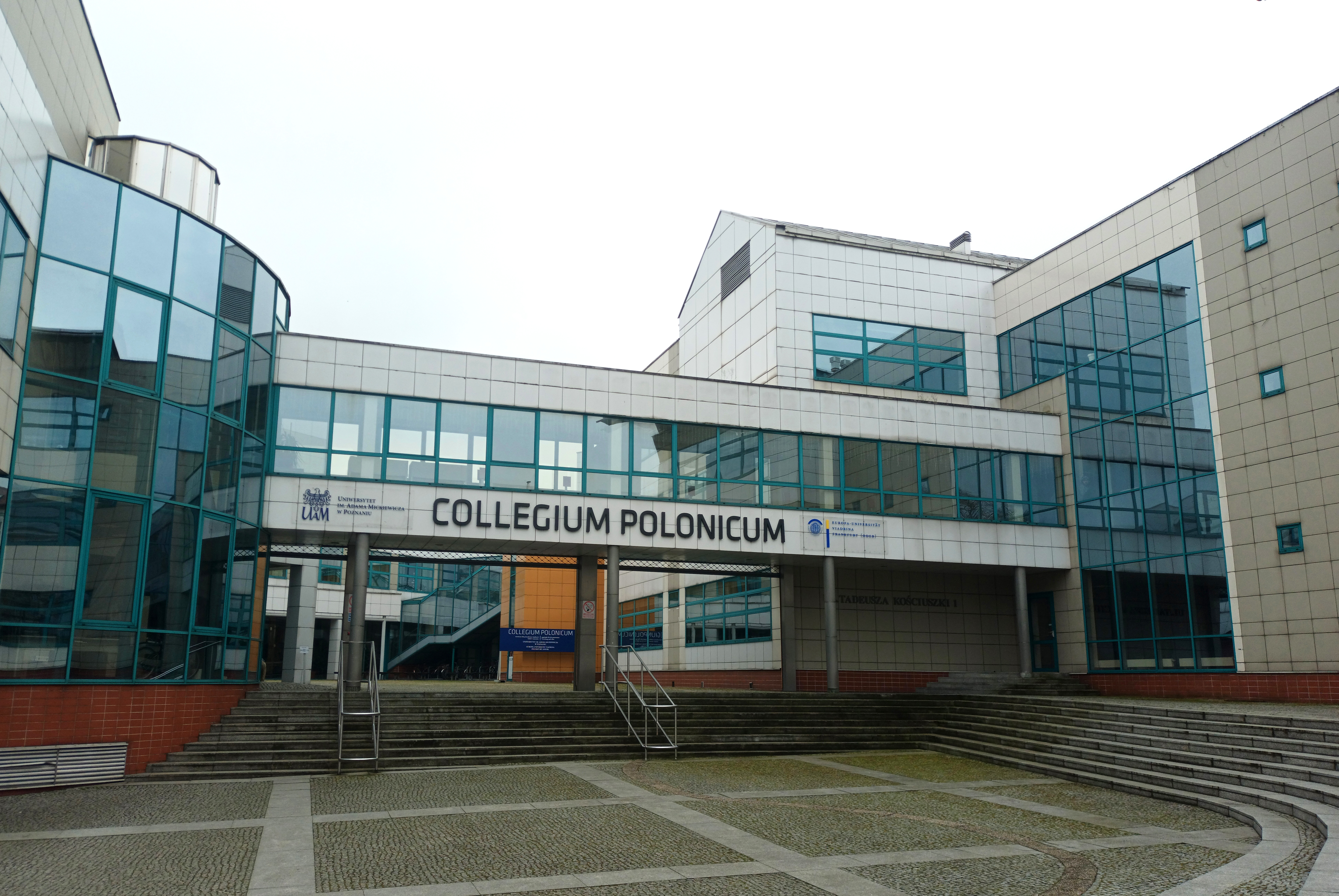
Collegium Polonicum

The Collegium Polonicum in Słubice is a joint academic unit of the Adam Mickiewicz University (Polish: Uniwersytet im. Adama Mickiewicza) in Poznań and of the Viadrina European University (German: Europa-Universität Viadrina) in Frankfurt (Oder). Its focus is on interdisciplinary scientific research and teaching on German-Polish, European, intercultural and cross-border issues. Collegium Polonicum is also a branch (Polish: filia) of the Adam Mickiewicz University in Słubice, in whose building this joint unit is physically based. This building had been erected in the years 1992–2001 by the Adam Mickiewicz University for the purpose of joint research and teaching activities with the Viadrina European University. As branch of Adam Mickiewicz University, Collegium Polonicum is one of four such units located outside Poznań and notably housing the Academic Secondary School for General Education in Słubice (Polish: Uniwersyteckie Liceum Ogólnokształcące w Słubicach).

== Founding History ==
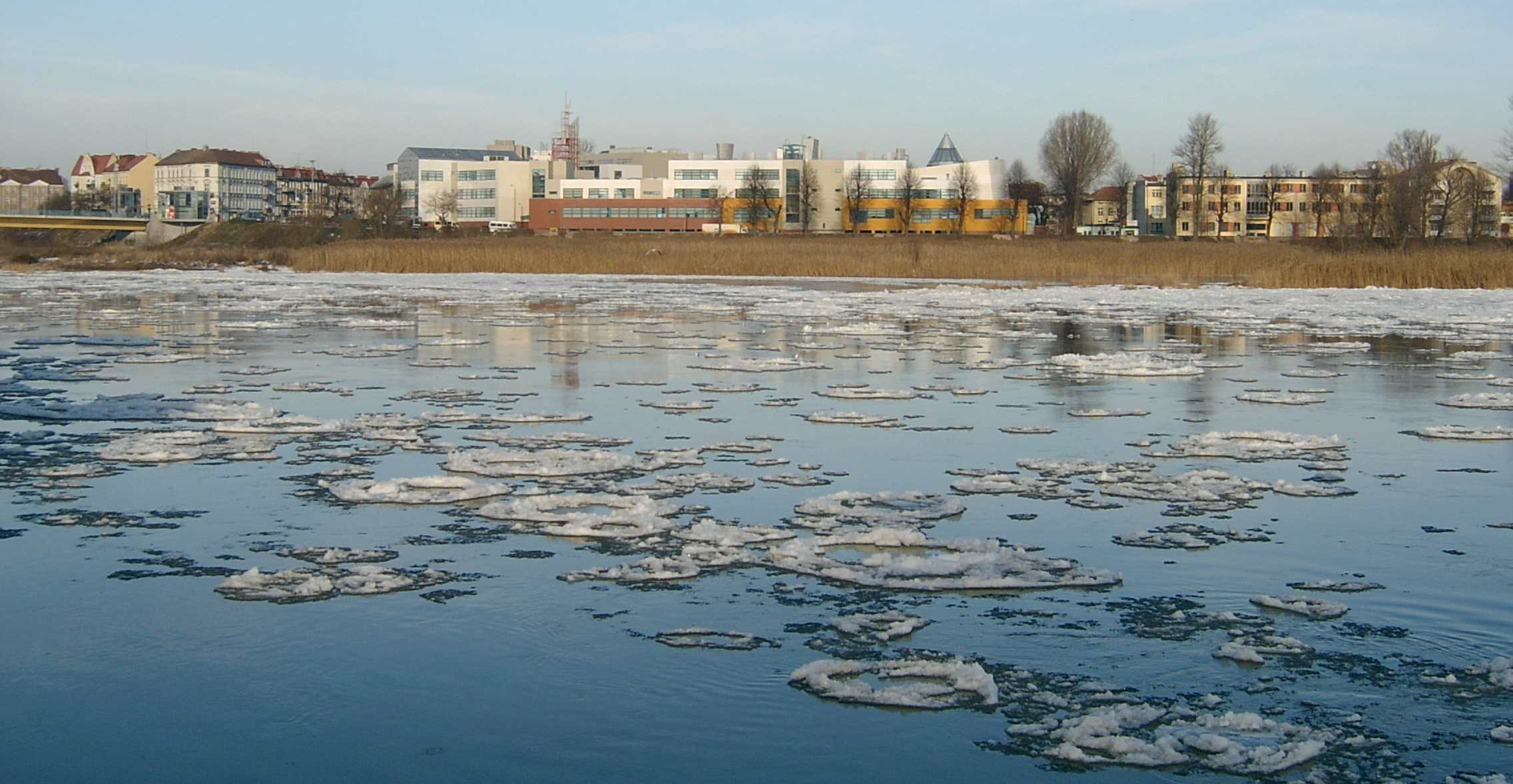
View from Frankfurt (Oder)

The European dimension in the re-establishment of the Viadrina University in Frankfurt (Oder) in 1989, as enshrined in this university's founding mission, is to “fulfil distinctive tasks concerning the German-Polish foreign policy relations and culturally with a view to Europe” (German:„…außenpolitisch im deutsch-polnischen Verhältnis und kulturell mit Blick auf Europa besondere Aufgaben zu erfüllen“). In order to secure the claim of close scientific networking with Poland and a targeted allocation of one third of the student places to Polish applicants, cooperation with four Polish universities – one of them Adam Mickiewicz University – took place during the founding phase. First ideas came up to create university infrastructure – initially only residences for Polish Viadrina students – also in Słubice, i.e. in the twin city of Frankfurt (Oder). Yet the Cooperation Agreement between the Minister for National Education of the Republic of Poland and the Minister for Science and Culture of the Federal State of Brandenburg signed on the day of the ceremonial opening of the Viadrina European University (i.e. 6 September 1991), manifests the intention to create in Słubice student residences as well as an institution for research and teaching, including library and laboratory facilities. The 25th anniversary celebrations of Collegium Polonicum in 2016 referred to this date.

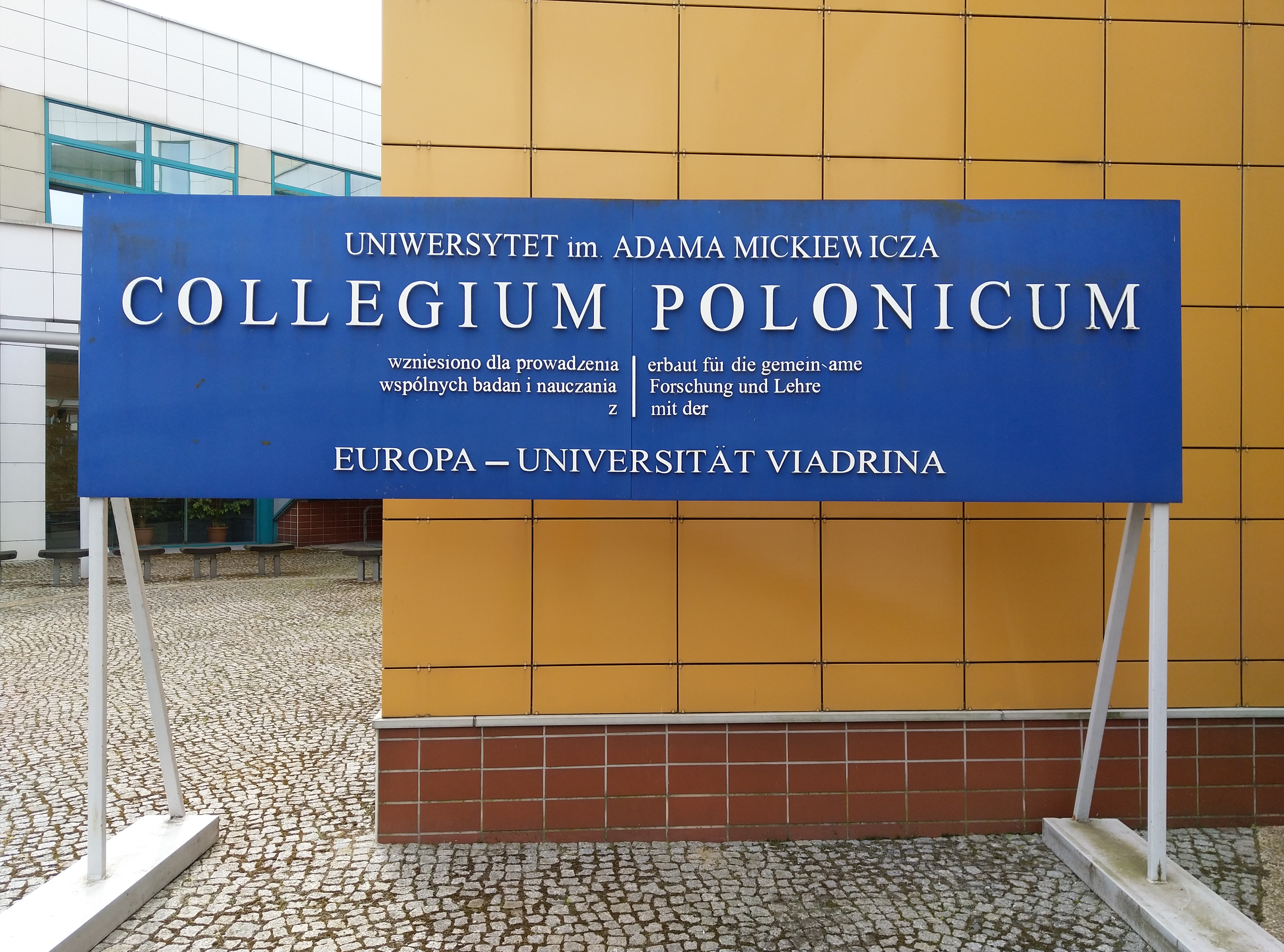
Plaque at the main entrance to Collegium Polonicum

At Adam Mickiewicz University, the idea of a "Collegium Polonicum" was subsequently developed as an institution for joint teaching and research activities with the European University Viadrina. After having received political assent on the Polish and the German side, a joint commission of the Adam Mickiewicz University and the European University Viadrina developed a concept for the Collegium Polonicum. This concept was approved by the Senate of the European University Viadrina on 19 December 1992 and by the Senate of the Adam Mickiewicz University on 22 December 1992. This was preceded by a symbolic laying of the foundation stone on 16 October 1992 as the founding act for the Collegium Polonicum. Since 1994, first lectures for students of the European University Viadrina took place in rented rooms in Słubice. In 1995, the Collegium Polonicum library was opened, also in rented rooms. The opening of the first building part of the Collegium Polonicum took place on 10 June 1998, and of the entire building with the library on 1 February 2001. With its opening, the Collegium Polonicum received the status of a branch (Polish: ośrodek zamiejscowy respectively filia) of Adam Mickiewicz University, to which also belongs the library. On 2 October 2002, the Collegium Polonicum was put on a bi-national legal basis with the signing of the “Treaty between the Minister for National Education and Sport of the Republic of Poland and the Ministry for Science, Research and Culture of the Federal State of Brandenburg on the Collegium Polonicum in Słubice”. This treaty, as already the 1992 concept of both universities, enshrines the agreed basic consensus that the Polish side finances the construction and maintenance of the built infrastructure, while the German side covers the expenses for the establishment and operation of five professorial chairs.

== Building ==
For the Collegium Polonicum building, the design of the Poznań architect Tomasz Durniewicz was selected in a limited competition organised by Adam Mickiewicz University. Construction works started in 1995. The opening of the first building part of the Collegium Polonicum took place on 10 June 1998, and of the entire building on 1 February 2001. The Collegium Polonicum has a total floor space of 20,546 m^{2}. Of this, 14,579 m^{2} are allotted to the main building with approx. 32 seminar and laboratory rooms, two conference halls and the large assembly hall with about 1,000 seats, a canteen and the offices for scientific as well as technical and administrative staff. 5,967 m^{2} are allotted to the library section connected to the main building by a bridge. The construction costs were approximately PLN 170 million.

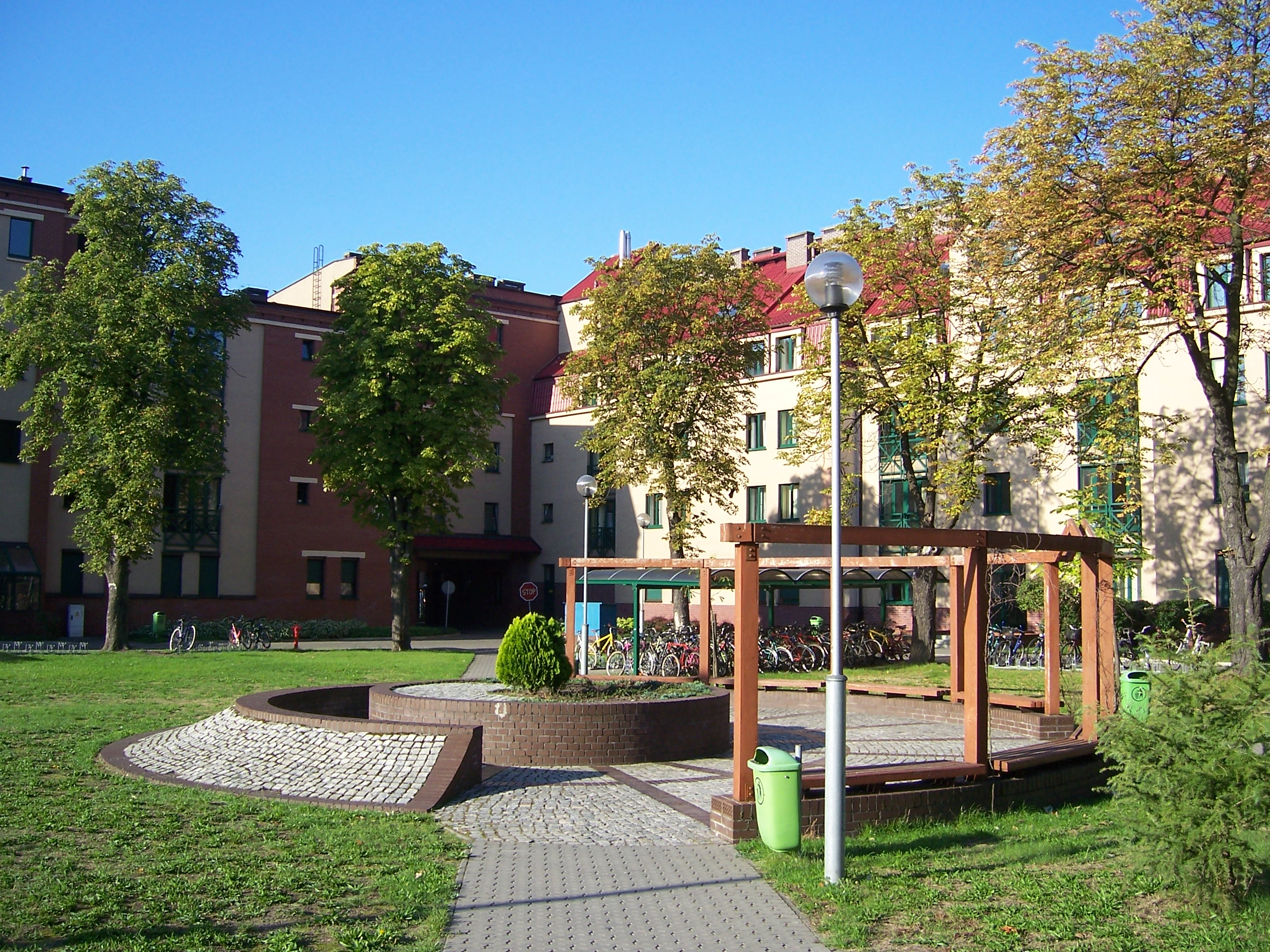
Inner court of the Student Residences Campus in Słubice

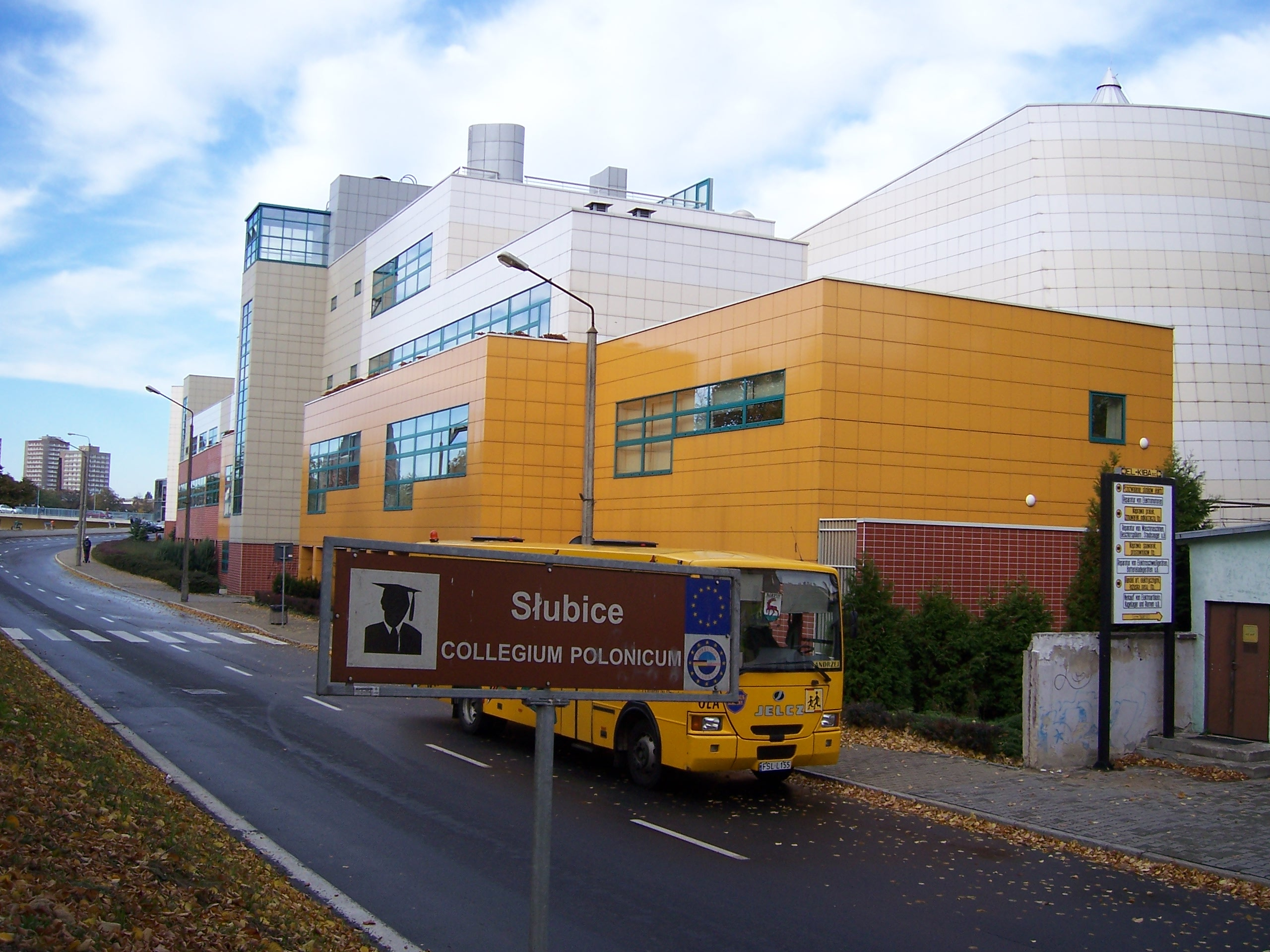
Tourist sign of Collegium Polonicum

Apart from the Collegium Polonicum building itself, the Adam Mickiewicz University has built several student residences in Słubice. In October 1993, the first Polish Viadrina students could move into an inner city student dormitory called Amicus, which constituted the completion of the abandoned shell of a nurses' home. From 1994 onwards, a student residences campus was constructed on a post-military site according to a design by the Warsaw architectural office Pracownia Architektoniczna BNS Warszawa. In addition to seven residential buildings, the campus includes areas for a student club, amenities and sports activities. The first rooms were ready for occupancy in 1998, and the overall project was completed in 2003 with the handover of a residence for doctoral students and university staff. In total over 1,100 dormitory places were created, mainly in single and double rooms, plus 40 two- and three-room apartments for university members and about 40 temporary overnight accommodation places in single and double rooms. The construction of the Collegium Polonicum and the student campus was financed to 65% from the budget of the Republic of Poland, to 20% from European funds under the PHARE programme and to 15% from the Foundation for German-Polish Cooperation. In accordance to the joint concept of 1992 and the interministerial agreement of 2002, it is the Adam Mickiewicz University only that is the owner of the properties and obliged to cover maintenance and operational costs (see Article 6 of the Treaty). In 2013, Adam Mickiewicz University began to reduce its real estate and building stock in Słubice. Apart from several undeveloped plots of land that had been set aside for extensions to the dormitory capacity and sports infrastructure, Adam Mickiewicz University sold the student residence Amicus to the municipality of Słubice, which set up 50 communal housing units there. Since 2017, the building constructed as a residence for doctoral students (Dom Doktoranta) is offered for sale by the Adam Mickiewicz University as a residential building with a floor space of 1,951.4 m^{2}, land area 3,530 m^{2}.

== Management and Cooperation Structure ==
In accordance to the 1992 concept for the Collegium Polonicum, in 1993 both universities appointed a management board for the Collegium Polonicum consisting of one Scientific Director and one Administrative Director. These two directors also participated in all meetings of the Mixed Commission (German: Gemischte Kommission, Polish: Komisja Mieszana), consisting of the rectors, deputy rectors (from 1999 on the side of the European University Viadrina the president and vice-presidents) and chancellors of both universities. On those regular meetings, all aspects of cooperation between Adam Mickiewicz University and European University Viadrina were discussed. Following the resignation of the Scientific Director in 1997, no new appointment was made. Since then, the management board of the Collegium Polonicum consists of the Administrative Director and the Deputy Rector or Vice-President responsible for the Collegium Polonicum on behalf of Adam Mickiewicz University and of Europa-Universität Viadrina respectively. This has also remained unchanged by the 2002 Treaty, by which the former Mixed Commission has been replaced by a Permanent Commission responsible explicitly for Collegium Polonicum (German: Ständige Kommission, Polish: Komisja Stała). It consists of the President and Rector of each university, the chancellors and the management board of Collegium Polonicum.

Management of Collegium Polonicum

Administrative Director

- 1993- Dr Krzysztof Wojciechowski

Scientific Director

- 1993-1997 Professor Waldemar Pfeiffer

Viadrina European University Vice President with responsibility for Collegium Polonicum

- 1997-2002 Professor Jan C. Joerden (until 1999 as Deputy Rector)
- 2002-2015 Ms. Janine Nuyken
- 2015-17 Professor Ines Härtel
- 2017- Ms. Janine Nuyken

Adam Mickiewicz University Deputy Rector with responsibility for Collegium Polonicum

- 1997-2002 Professor Stanisław Lorenc
- 2002-2008 Professor Janusz Wiśniewski
- 2008-2016 Professor Krzysztof Krasowski
- 2016-2018 Professor Beata Mikołajczyk
- 2018- Professor Tadeusz Wallas

The statute of Adam Mickiewicz University provides for a branch of the University, such as the Collegium Polonicum, to be headed by a branch director (Polish: "Dyrektor filii"). Such a position is not filled at Collegium Polonicum.

== Academic Staff at Collegium Polonicum ==
=== Academic Staff of the Viadrina European University at the Professorial Chairs financed by the Federal State of Brandenburg for the Collegium Polonicum ===
In the 1992 concept for the Collegium Polonicum, jointly developed by the Adam Mickiewicz University and the Viadrina European University, it was agreed that the Viadrina would cover the costs of five professorial chairs at the Collegium Polonicum, while Adam Mickiewicz University would finance the construction, maintenance and operation of the Collegium Polonicum building and the student residences. In article 4 (No. 1 and 2) of the interministerial agreement for the Collegium Polonicum of 2002, the Federal State of Brandenburg accordingly committed itself to bear 'the staff costs for five professor and seven research assistant positions', including the related annual operative and administrative costs. Staff on these positions is to be employed in accordance to employment and salary regulations of the Federal State of Brandenburg.

In accordance with the concept adopted by Adam Mickiewicz University and European University Viadrina in December 1992, interdisciplinary academic activity at the Collegium Polonicum was to be committed to three overarching goals:

- complementation of research and lecture activities of the Viadrina European University, especially in the field of Polish history, language and culture (hence the name Collegium Polonicum),
- support of the idea of a united Europe
- and development and support of cross-border, regional and trans-regional cooperation.

In 2002, the inter-ministerial Treaty provided the substantive framework for the Collegium Polonicum as an interdisciplinary institution valid until today. The name Collegium Polonicum was retained, but the emphasis of this institution was shifted away from Polish language, history and culture. According to this, the spectrum for teaching and research covers all the scientific disciplines represented at Adam Mickiewicz University and at the European University Viadrina, however "with special consideration of

- problems of the European Integration,
- border regions
- and comparative research in an international and intercultural dimension”

The budget provided by the Federal State of Brandenburg for five professor and seven research assistant positions is divided into eight professorial chairs, i.e.:

- Entangled History of Ukraine,
- Comparative Central European Studies,
- Polish-German Literary and Cultural Relations and Gender Studies,
- Heritage Protection,
- Multicultural Communication (Slavonic and English Linguistics and Language Use),
- Polish and European Private Law and Comparative Law,
- Polish Public Law, including European and Commercial Law,
- Polish Criminal Law.

The holders of these chairs hold a full professor position in two cases and a half-time professor position in six cases. Three of them also hold a further professor position at a Polish university, in one case at the Adam Mickiewicz University. The financed seven research assistant positions are shared between 12 researchers mostly on half-time or one-third-time leases, of which six hold a PhD. In addition, there are PhD students and student workers on temporary leases or grants.

=== Further Academic Staff of the Viadrina European University ===
The Chair of Culture and History of Central and Eastern Europe, which derived from a grant by the Zeit Foundation, is the only chair of the European University Viadrina located in the Collegium Polonicum however not financed by the funds of the State of Brandenburg intended for the Collegium Polonicum. Various chairs of the European University Viadrina, such as for example the professorial chair at the core of the Centre for Interdisciplinary Polish Studies, give the postal address of the Collegium Polonicum as their address in Poland, but are not spatially and structurally present there. In that they take advantage of an internal postal connection established between the administrations of the Viadrina and the Collegium Polonicum, which ensures that correspondence from Poland addressed to the European University Viadrina and from Germany addressed to the Collegium Polonicum can be sent as domestic mail. Likewise, Collegium Polonicum and Europa-Universität Viadrina can be reached as a domestic call from the respective other country by means of a microwave transmission between the telephone systems of both institutions.

In August 2019, the Europa-Universität Viadrina was granted funding of in total €4.16 million for 2019-23 by the Federal State of Brandenburg for four professorships and material resources within the project European New School of Digital Studies. These chairs will be based in the Collegium Polonicum, which will also be the venue for the likewise financed study course of Master of Digital Entrepreneurship. This exceptional financial support granted by the Federal State of Brandenburg for a discipline field so far not represented neither at the Viadrina European University nor at the Collegium Polonicum has been justified by the fact that the European New School of Digital Studies is "initially to be established as an academic unit of the Viadrina, and in perspective to be further developed into an international faculty with the participation of foreign universities". Yet, the Adam Mickiewicz University's involvement in this venture taking place at the Collegium Polonicum is minimal.

=== Academic Staff of the Adam Mickiewicz University ===
The number of academic staff of the Adam Mickiewicz University working at the Collegium Polonicum at the time of its formal opening in 2001 was officially given as 65, including 25 professors. However, the vast majority of these were employees who had their workplaces at faculties of the Adam Mickiewicz University situated in Poznań. During the lecture period, these employees commuted to the Collegium Polonicum to conduct courses mainly in the initially extensive range of study courses offered there by Adam Mickiewicz University. Only about two to four lecturers per study course offered by the Adam Mickiewicz University at the Collegium Polonicum had their actual workplace there, none of them a professor. In that, the Collegium Polonicum was no different from the other branches of Adam Mickiewicz University at that time.

In 2012, the Adam Mickiewicz University established ten post-doc researcher positions, including five professorial positions, in the course of the creation of the Polish-German Research Institute at Collegium Polonicum. This institute was created jointly with the Viadrina European University in order to contribute to sharpen the interdisciplinary academic profile of the Collegium Polonicum. Therefore, its research activities, as defined in its regulations (§ 3 no. 2) adopted by both universities in 2012, were identical with those defined in the 2002 Treaty for the Collegium Polonicum, i.e. activities "with special consideration of problems of the European Integration, border regions, and comparative research in an international and intercultural dimension”. The Polish-German Research Institute was in particular meant to become the core of a German-Polish Faculty.

As a result of the closure of the Polish-German Research Institute in 2018, and of the continuous decrease in the number of study courses offered at the Collegium Polonicum, the academic staff of Adam Mickiewicz University there is reduced to six post-doc lecturers, who are teaching students of "Polish Philology as a Foreign Language", and pupils of the Academic Secondary School for General Education. Single lecture activities by Adam Mickiewicz University lecturers in the Master of Digital Entrepreneurship study course offered by the Viadrina European University are not connected to the creation of Adam Mickiewicz University lecturer positions at the Collegium Polonicum. Yet the immediate need to create capacities for new staff resources for a Digital Institute had been the officially given reason for the 2018 rapid closure of the joint Polish-German Research Institute with its 10 post-doc researchers employed by the Adam Mickiewicz University.

=== Europa-Fellows ===
The opening of the Collegium Polonicum is connected to the creation of the "International Programme for the Promotion of Young Academics in European Research – Europa-Fellows". This PhD programme, financed by the German Federal Ministry for Education and Research with €0.8 million annually, provided 78 post-graduates (48 in the programme's first edition 2000–2003, 30 in its second edition 2003-2005) with individual PhD student grants. The recipients of these German grants could complete their PhD studies at a faculty either of the Viadrina European University, or (as in most cases) of the Adam Mickiewicz University. Head of the graduate project until 2002 was Jan C. Joerden, followed by Janine Nuyken. The interdisciplinary PhD research was carried out in the subject areas represented at the time by lecture chairs or study courses at the Collegium Polonicum, i.e.:

- EU Enlargement,
- Urban Development and Management,
- European Heritage Protection,
- Management and Marketing in Central and Eastern Europe,
- Cross-border Environmental Policies,
- European Legal Harmonisation and Comparison of European Legal Systems,
- Cross-border Economic and Cultural Cooperation (Central European Studies in Comparative Perspective).

=== Cooperation of Academic Staff ===
The key scientific output of the Collegium Polonicum is its interdisciplinary series Thematicon, published by its Management since 1995. The first five volumes were published the Adam Mickiewicz University Press (Wydawnictwo Naukowe Uniwersytetu im Adama Mickiewicza) in Poznan. Since 2002, the series has been published in the Berlin-based publishing house Logos Verlag. By 2019, 34 volumes have been published, including four edited by the Collegium Polonicum Management itself on the topic of cross-border university cooperation. Of the remaining volumes have been published:

- 5 by academic staff of the professorial chairs financed by the Federal State of Brandenburg for the Collegium Polonicum,
- 3 within the Europa-Fellows PhD programme financed by the German Federal Ministry for Education and Research (2000-2005),
- 9 by staff of the Polish-German Research Institute (2012-2018) at the Collegium Polonicum and
- 13 by other academic staff.

Six volumes deal with aspects in the field of legal studies and six more in the field of language and translation studies, seven look at border and cross-border topics from a political science perspective, and eleven are devoted to aspects of interdisciplinarity, interculturality, transnationality and cultural transfer.

Beyond that, the Collegium Polonicum does not appear as a recognisable scientific unit with a distinct research profile. E.g. on the Internet sites, research projects or publications are not presented as ventures of the Collegium Polonicum, but can be found on the respective lecture chair sites of the respective university. In addition, no particular cooperation between the lecture chairs at the Collegium Polonicum is communicated that would go beyond the general contacts between lecture chairs at a given university. The venture of a European New School of Digital Studies, which started in the winter semester 2020–21, has its own website, which does not refer to the Collegium Polonicum. It is nowhere explicitly intended to include the eight lecture chairs financed by the State of Brandenburg for the Collegium Polonicum in the project.

A persistent practical problem of cooperation between the academic staff of the two universities is, among other things, the still existing wage gap between employees in Germany and Poland. For instance, a BSc graduate working half-time as student assistance (German: Wissenschaftliche Hilfskraft - WHK) employed by the Viadrina European University earns a monthly net salary of about 920 EUR. This sum is roughly equivalent to the monthly gross salary of PLN 3,800 for a post-doc employed by the Adam Mickiewicz University as assistant professor (Polish: adiunkt).

== Study programmes at the Collegium Polonicum ==
=== Study programmes of the Viadrina European University ===
Due to its location at the Oder Bridge, the Collegium Polonicum is only a short walk away from the inner city lecture buildings of the Viadrina in Frankfurt. Thus, it is used as a venue for some lectures or seminars, mostly with Polish dimension, offered within the Viadrina study programmes. Hence in a strict sense, there are no Viadrina study programmes physically anchored exclusively at the Collegium Polonicum. Accordingly, the figures published for the number of Viadrina students studying at the Collegium Polonicum are interpretative: the numbers given are e.g. 100 students for the academic year of 2004–05, or 250 for 2015–16. Currently, almost all lectures of the part-time, post-graduate study course of Protection of European Cultural Heritage, and most of the lectures of the MSc course of Culture and History of Central and Eastern Europe, are held at the Collegium Polonicum, which is also the seat of the respective managing professorial chair. Also the courses of the temporarily existing MBA programme 'Management for Central and Eastern Europe took place mainly at the Collegium Polonicum. In the winter term 2020–21 on, the Viadrina European University starts its study course Master of Digital Entrepreneurship, offered within the framework of its European New School of Digital Studies project. The courses are to be mainly held at the Collegium Polonicum, which is also the seat of the four new professorial chairs created for this venture.

=== Study programmes of the Adam Mickiewicz University ===
In the 1990s, the existing state universities in Poland were faced with a constantly increasing demand for study places that by far exceeded the capacities in their ageing building stock. As a result, a large number of private universities were founded, and state as well as private universities offered a broad range of distance learning study courses (Polish: studia zaoczne) with compulsory attendance only at weekends. In addition, many state universities began to offer some of their study courses in parallel also in so-called university branches located in the respective university's city region. In most cases, these branches were installed in premises temporarily rented from the respective local municipality. Yet in some cases, universities engaged in investment activities. The Adam Mickiewicz University had, apart from the Collegium Polonicum, at times seven other branches in the Poznań metropolitan region. Four of them were in rented municipal buildings in the cities of Kościan, Ostrów Wielkopolski, Śrem, and Wągrowiec, and three in erected by the university for this purpose buildings in the cities of Gniezno, Piła and Kalisz. For instance, in the academic year 2008–09, a total of 5,461 students were studying at these branches. At the Collegium Polonicum, the Adam Mickiewicz University offered seven study programmes which were also offered in Poznań (in some cases with a different specialisation):

- Applied Computer Science (Faculty of Physics),
- Environmental protection (Faculty of Biology),
- Spatial Management (Faculty of Geology and Geography),
- Philology (German Studies) (Faculty of Modern Philology),
- Polish Philology (Faculty of Modern Philology),
- Political Science (Faculty of Political Science and Journalism),
- National Security (Faculty of Political Science and Journalism).

Some of these study courses had been offered at times both as presence and distance learning. Following the decrease in the number of students in Poland (from 1.93 million in the academic year 2008–09 to 1.23 million in 2018-19) and the massive expansion of the building stock and personnel capacities at the universities’ main seats (in the case of the Adam Mickiewicz University, particularly on the new Morasko Campus in the north of Poznań), the demand for study courses offered in branches rapidly decreased. With the 2011 reform of the Polish higher education legislation, the further offer of study courses at branches was made dependent on the permanent presence of lecture staff there, and the formation of corresponding academic units. This made a simple parallel offer of a study course already conducted at a university's main seat impossible.

As a result, university branches in Poland were in numerous cases closed, or in some cases converted into units (so-called basic unit, Polish Jednostka podstawowa) sufficiently staffed and corresponding to the academic profile of unique study courses offered by them. This did however not happen in the case of the Collegium Polonicum, which, as a university branch operated in cooperation with a foreign university, was never threatened with closure. The only permanent study programme offer of the Adam Mickiewicz University at the Collegium Polonicum is the BSc course of Polish Philology as a Foreign Language managed by the Faculty of Modern Philology. To this add temporary offers of post-graduate, extra-occupational study courses (e.g. of International Relations – Regional and transborder cooperation, offered by the Faculty of Political Science and Journalism). The number of students on study courses offered by the Adam Mickiewicz University at the Collegium Polonicum peaked at 1,150 in the academic year 2004–05, and has been declining steadily ever since (200 in 2015-16).

=== Joint Study programmes of the Viadrina and the Adam Mickiewicz University ===
There are three study programmes with a double degree by the Viadrina European University and the Adam Mickiewicz University offered at the Collegium Polonicum.

- Polish-German Law Studies,
- Master of Intercultural Communication,
- Intercultural German Studies.

In these three cases, both the lecturers from the Adam Mickiewicz University commuting from Poznań, and the staff of the professorial chairs financed by the State of Brandenburg for the Collegium Polonicum, hold their lectures and seminars at the Collegium Polonicum; additional Viadrina European University lectures are to be attended in Frankfurt. Particularly the Polish-German Law Studies offered since 1992 are regarded as a role model of how Polish and German students inter-actively get to know together their own as well as the respective other legal system, and thus acquire the knowledge and the soft skills to professionally work on the Polish as well as on the German site. The number of students in these double degree programmes is relatively constant and varies between 430 (academic year 2004-05) and 310 (2015–16).

== Academic Secondary School for General Education in Słubice ==
With the beginning of the 2018–19 school year, the Academic Secondary School for General Education in Słubice (Polish: Uniwersyteckie Liceum Ogólnokształcące w Słubicach ULO), was opened in the Collegium Polonicum building. This is a private school run by the Adam Mickiewicz University. According to its statute, the school is mainly financed by school fees and other charges as well as permanent contributions from the District of Słubice (Polish: Powiat Słubicki); there is no financial input by the Adam Mickiewicz University. In the Polish school system, a lyceum is the school of secondary education attended by pupils of the 9th to the 12th class and leading to the higher education entrance qualification. When fully operating as a secondary school offering three tracks, it will occupy around half of the 32 lecture and laboratory rooms of the Collegium Polonicum building.

== Trivia ==
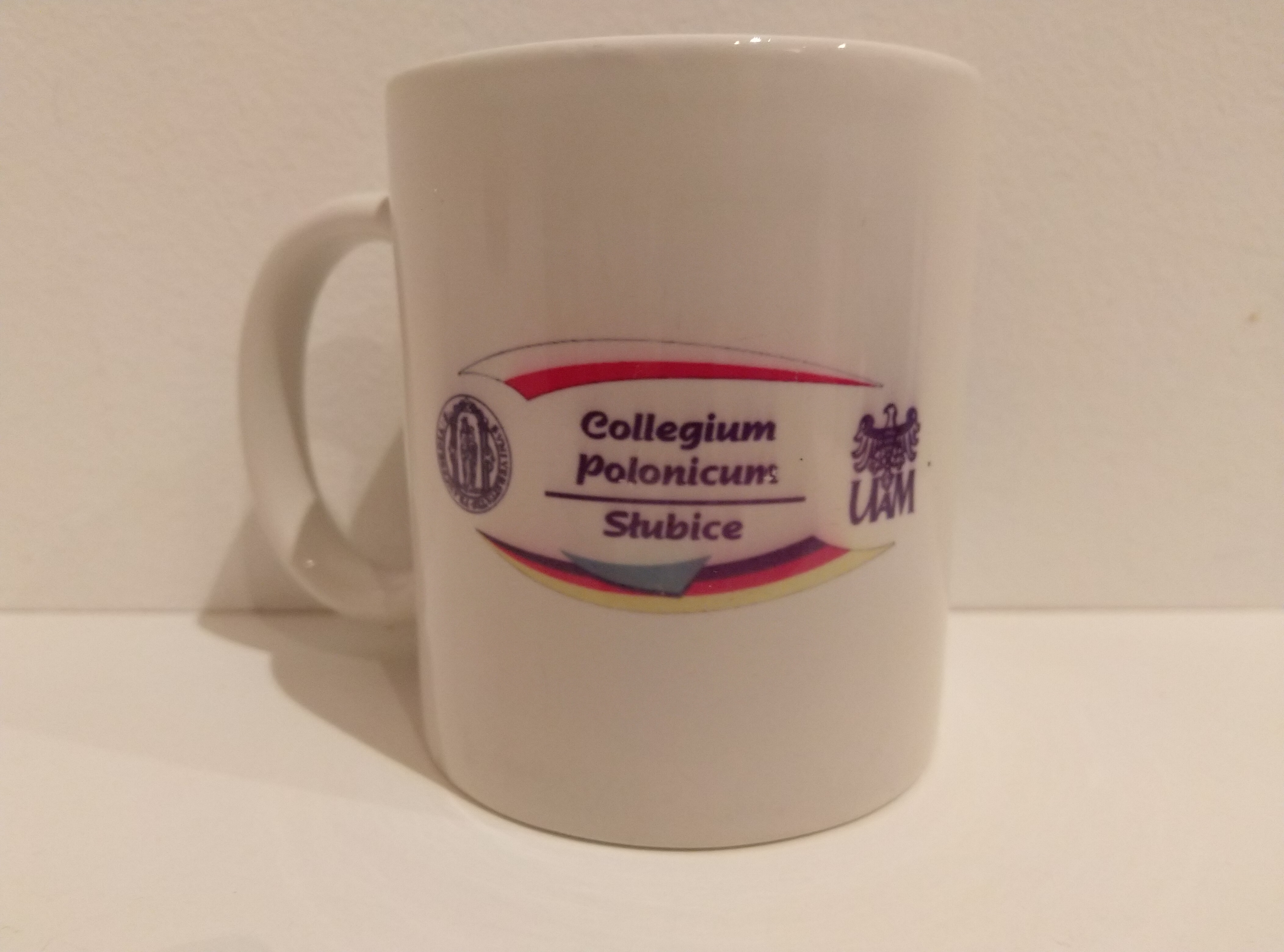
Cup from 2007 with the Collegium Polonicum logo

In 2014, following an initiative of the Collegium Polonicum's administrative director Krzysztof Wojciechowski, the municipality of Słubice erected a Monument to Wikipedia on Frankfurt Square (Plac Frankfurcki) situated just a few steps away from the Collegium Polonicum. As reason for the promotion of a Wikipedia Monument in this place, Krzysztof Wojciechowski stated that he sees "explicitly in Słubice and Frankfurt the same motive, the same spark as with the Wikipedians": "May this monument remind us that thanks to determination, the desire for knowledge and the overcoming of one's own borders, a better future for the border area, Europe and the entire human race is conceivable."

In the period of the Collegium Polonicum's establishment and its first years of operation (i.e. from 1996 to 2006), it constituted a popular venue for meetings and speeches of Polish, German and European politicians, who exploited its aura of an emerging exceptional place for Polish-German reconciliation and European integration. This was to be observed again between 2010 and 2013 in the course of an initiative launched at that time by the then Viadrina President Günter Pleuger and his Poznań counterpart to raise the academic profile of the Collegium Polonicum. In total, the Collegium Polonicum has been visited by two Presidents of the European Parliament (Jerzy Buzek, Josep Borrell), two Presidents of Poland (Aleksander Kwaśniewski, Bronisław Komorowski) and two Federal Presidents of Germany (Richard von Weizsäcker, Joachim Gauck), one Marshal of the Sejm (Józef Oleksy) and one President of the Bundestag (Wolfgang Thierse), four Prime Ministers of Poland (Tadeusz Mazowiecki, Włodzimierz Cimoszewicz, Jerzy Buzek, Marek Belka) and one Chancellor of Germany (Helmut Kohl), three European Commissioners (Günter Verheugen, Michel Barnier, Corina Crețu), as well as five Polish Ministers (Włodzimierz Cimoszewicz, Mirosław Handke, Waldemar Dąbrowski, Wladyslaw Bartoszewski, Radosław Sikorski) and four German Federal Ministers (Claudia Nolte, Hans-Dietrich Genscher, Joschka Fischer, Guido Westerwelle). However, the President of Poland Andrzej Duda chose the Municipal Library Building for his public speech during his visit to Słubice in 2019.
