= Jane Hunt (American politician) =

American politician

Member of New Hampshire House of Representatives for Merrimack 15
- In office December 5, 2012 – December 2, 2014
- Succeeded by: Linda Kenison

Personal details
- Party: Democratic
- Education: Southern New Hampshire University

Jane Hunt is an American politician. She represented Merrimack 15th district at the New Hampshire House of Representatives from 2012 to 2014.
