= Nerd =

Type of person

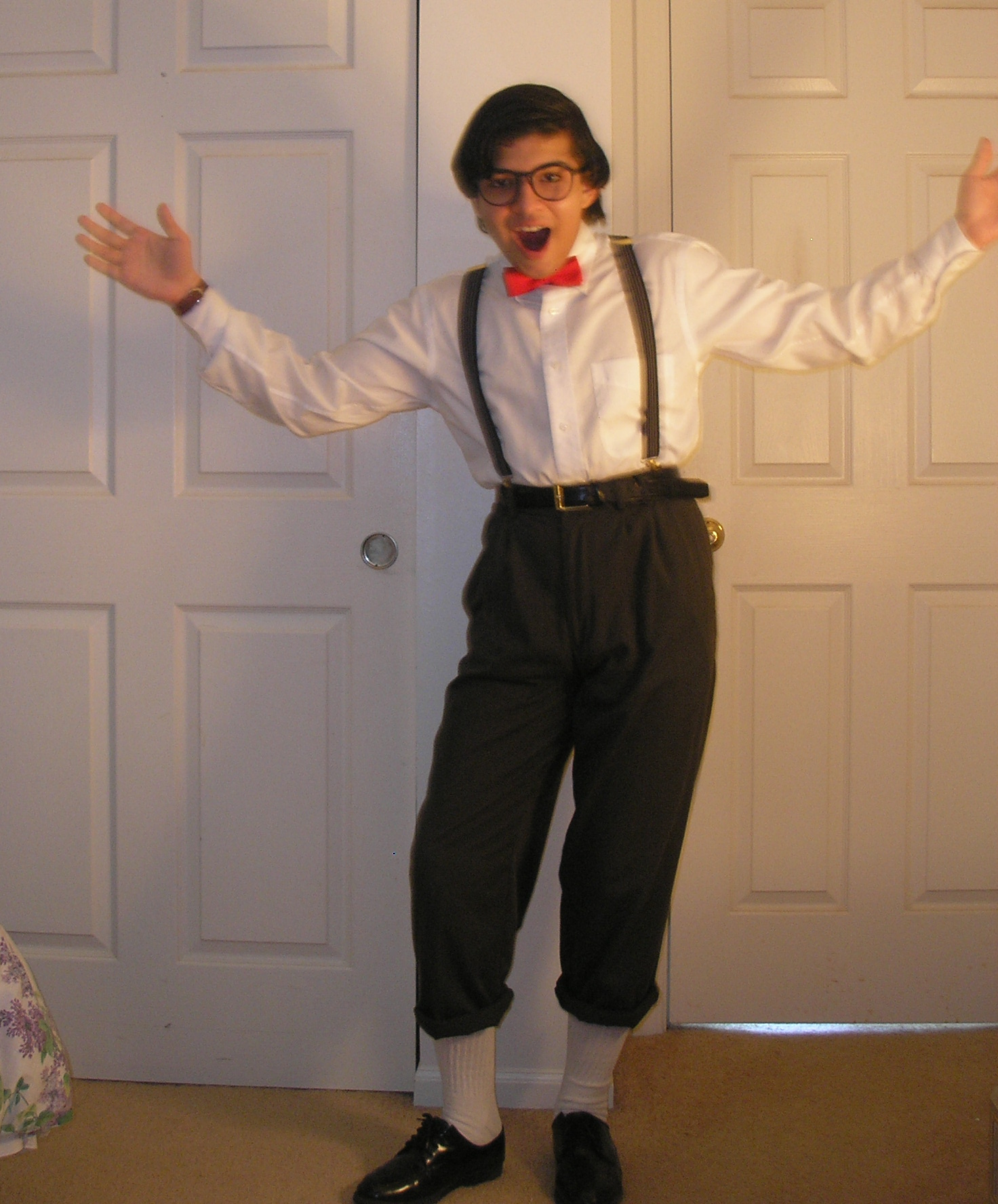
A Wikipedia user dressed as a stereotypical nerd, 2007

A nerd is a person seen as unattractive, over-intellectual, and lacking in social skills and socio-cultural intuition. Such a person may spend inordinate amounts of time on unpopular, little-known, or non-mainstream activities, which are generally highly technical, abstract, or relating to niche topics such as science fiction or fantasy, to the exclusion of more mainstream activities. Additionally, many so-called nerds are described as being introverted, shy, quirky, pedantic, and obsessive.

Originally derogatory, the term "nerd" was a stereotype, but as with other pejoratives, it has been reclaimed and redefined by some as a term of pride and group identity. The term is sometimes, though not always, used as a synonym for geek.

== Etymology ==
The first documented appearance of the word nerd is as the name of a creature in Dr. Seuss's book If I Ran the Zoo (1950), in which the narrator Gerald McGrew claims that he would collect "a Nerkle, a Nerd, and a Seersucker too" for his imaginary zoo. The slang meaning of the term, presumably unrelated, dates to 1951: a Newsweek magazine report on its popular use as a synonym for drip or square in Detroit, Michigan. By the early 1960s, usage of the term had spread throughout the United States, and even as far as Scotland. At some point, the word took on connotations of bookishness and social ineptitude.

An alternate spelling, as nurd or gnurd, also began to appear in the mid-1960s, or early 1970s. Author Philip K. Dick claimed to have coined the "nurd" spelling in 1973, but its first recorded use appeared in a 1965 student publication at Rensselaer Polytechnic Institute (RPI). Oral tradition there holds that the word is derived from knurd (drunk spelled backward), which was used to describe people who studied rather than partied. The term gnurd (spelled with the "g") was in use at the Massachusetts Institute of Technology (MIT) by the year 1965. The term "nurd" was also in use at the Massachusetts Institute of Technology as early as 1971.

According to Online Etymology Dictionary, the word is "probably" an alteration of the 1940s term nert 'stupid or crazy person', which is in itself an alteration of nut 'crazy person'.

The term was popularized in the 1970s by its heavy use in the sitcom Happy Days. On 28 January 1978, recurring characters The Nerds premiered on Saturday Night Live. The term was further popularized in the 1984 film Revenge of the Nerds.

== Culture and perception ==
=== Stereotype ===
==== Intellect and alleged nerdiness ====
Because of the nerd stereotype, many intelligent people are often thought of as nerdy. This belief can be harmful, as it can cause high school students to "switch off their lights" out of fear of being branded as a nerd, and cause otherwise appealing people to be considered nerdy simply for their intellect.

It has been argued that intellectuals are automatically nerdy because they were secretly envied, arrogant, or out of touch. However, Paul Graham stated in his essay, "Why Nerds are Unpopular", that intellect is neutral, meaning that many high school students neither admire nor deride classmates for intelligence itself. He also states that it is only the correlation that makes smart teens automatically seem nerdy, and personally defines a nerd as someone deemed not socially adept enough. Additionally, he says that the reason why many smart kids are unpopular is that they "don't have time for the activities required for popularity," since they instead prioritize intellectual, solitary pursuits, at the cost of being branded as "nerds." He also goes on to criticize suburbia and the public education system for enabling a popularity contest.

==== Stereotypical "nerd" appearance and fashion ====
Nerd Face as it appears in Twemoji

Stereotypical nerd appearance, often lampooned in caricatures, can include very large glasses, dental braces, buck teeth, a weak jawline, severe acne and pants worn high at the waist. Following suit of popular use in emoticons, Unicode released in 2015 a "nerd face" (U+1F913 🤓 NERD FACE), rendered in most fonts with glasses and, though less often today, buck teeth. In the media, many nerds are males, portrayed as being physically unfit, either overweight or skinny due to lack of physical exercise.

==== The stereotype across race and gender ====
It has been suggested by some, such as linguist Mary Bucholtz, that being a nerd may be a state of being "hyperwhite" and rejecting African-American culture and slang that "cool" white children use. However, after the Revenge of the Nerds movie franchise (with multicultural nerds), and the introduction of the Steve Urkel character on the television series Family Matters, nerds have been seen in all races and colors as well as more recently being a frequent young East Asian or Indian male stereotype in North America. Portrayals of "nerd girls" in films such as She's Out of Control, Welcome to the Dollhouse and She's All That imply that smart but nerdy women might suffer later in life if they do not focus on improving their physical attractiveness.

In the United States, a 2010 study published in the Journal of International and Intercultural Communication indicated that Asian Americans are perceived as most likely to be nerds, followed by White Americans, while non-White Hispanics and African Americans were perceived as least likely to be nerds. These stereotypes stem from concepts of Orientalism and Primitivism, as discussed in Ron Eglash's essay "Race, Sex, and Nerds: From Black Geeks to Asian American Hipsters".

==== Psychosocial conditions ====
Some of the stereotypical behaviors associated with the "nerd" stereotype have correlations with the traits of Asperger syndrome or other autism spectrum conditions.

=== Pride ===
Some measures of "nerdiness" are now considered desirable by many commentators. To some, "nerd" suggests a person who is intelligent, respectful, interesting, dedicated, individualistic, and able to earn a large salary doing what they love. Stereotypical nerd qualities are evolving, going from awkwardness and social ostracism to an allegedly more widespread acceptance and sometimes even celebration of their differences. Many so-called "nerdy people" have accumulated large fortunes, and many are able to find their niche in the American computer industry, concentrated in California's Silicon Valley, the Greater Seattle area (working for companies like Amazon or Microsoft), and the Silicon Slopes. These engineers and programmers have influenced popular culture in many ways, caught the attention of the media, and effectively designed a new category of everyday objects.

Being adept with computers, often considered a "nerdy" interest, is now widespread and even an expectation in professional and academic spaces. Many celebrities in the first decade of the 2000s publicly expressed interest in smartphones and other handheld devices. Similarly, many stereotypical "nerdy" interests, such as video games, tabletop RPGs, comic book franchises, and fantasy and science fiction works, are now international popular culture hits.

In the 1984 film Revenge of the Nerds, Robert Carradine worked to embody the nerd stereotype; in doing so, he helped create a definitive image of nerds. Additionally, the storyline presaged, and may have helped inspire, the "nerd pride" that emerged in the late 1990s. American Splendor regular Toby Radloff claims this was the movie that inspired him to become "The Genuine Nerd from Cleveland, Ohio". In the American Splendor film, Toby's friend, American Splendor author Harvey Pekar, was less receptive to the movie, believing it to be hopelessly idealistic, explaining that Toby, an adult low-income file clerk, had nothing in common with the middle-class kids in the film who would eventually attain college degrees, success, and cease being perceived as nerds. Many, however, seem to share Radloff's view, as "nerd pride" has become more widespread in the years since. MIT professor Gerald Sussman, for example, seeks to instill pride in nerds:

My idea is to present an image to children that it is good to be intellectual, and not to care about the peer pressures to be anti-intellectual. I want every child to turn into a nerd – where that means someone who prefers studying and learning to competing for social dominance, which can unfortunately cause the downward spiral into social rejection.

— Gerald Sussman, quoted by Katie Hafner, The New York Times, 29 August 1993

=== Bullying ===
Individuals who are labeled as "nerds" are often the target of bullying due to a range of reasons that may include physical appearance or social background. Paul Graham has suggested that the reason nerds are frequently singled out for bullying is their indifference to popularity or social context, in the face of a youth culture that views popularity as paramount. However, research findings suggest that bullies are often as socially inept as their academically better-performing victims, and that popularity fails to confer protection from bullying. Other commentators have pointed out that pervasive harassment of intellectually-oriented youth began only in the mid-twentieth century.

== In popular culture ==
- In his 1995 book Dumbing Down Our Kids, Charles J. Sykes wrote, "Be nice to nerds. You may end up working for them." This quotation, as well as the passage it was taken from, has been popularized on the Internet in the 2000s. It has occasionally been incorrectly attributed to Bill Gates.
- Since 1997, Slashdot has used the tagline "News for nerds. Stuff that matters."
- 2006 single "White & Nerdy" by "Weird Al" Yankovic, is a parody of the song "Ridin'" by Chamillionaire ft. Krayzie Bone. It prominently features and celebrates aspects of nerd culture in contrast to those of gangsta rap.
- In Spain, Nerd Pride Day has been observed on 25 May since 2006, the same day as Towel Day, another somewhat nerdy holiday. The date was picked as it is the anniversary of the release of Star Wars.
- Established in 2007, fans of the Vlogbrothers (a YouTube channel starring John and Hank Green) call themselves "nerdfighters" and refer to the fan base as a whole as "Nerdfighteria".
- Rhett & Link's 2013 comedy rap song "Epic Rap Battle: Nerd vs. Geek" clearly lays out the difference between the two. The Geek is focused on trendy superheroes, pop culture, fashion, website coding, and iPhone applications, while the Nerd brags about LARPing, homebuilt computers, and rocket science.
- Australian events such as Oz Comic-Con (a large comic book and cosplay convention, similar to San Diego Comic-Con) and Supernova, are incredibly popular events among the culture of people who identify themselves as nerds. In 2016, Oz Comic-Con in Perth saw almost 20,000 cosplayers and comic book fans meet to celebrate the event, hence being named a "professionally organised Woodstock for geeks".

== See also ==
- Angry Video Game Nerd
- Anti intellectualism
- Chigyu
- Egghead
- Fandom
- Geek
- Grok
- Hipster
- Intellectualism
- Nerd music
  - Nerdcore
- Otaku
- Preppy
- Techbro
- Video game culture
