= American University in Bulgaria =

Private university in Blagoevgrad, Bulgaria

Coordinates: 42°1′17″N 23°5′42″E

- Американски университет в България
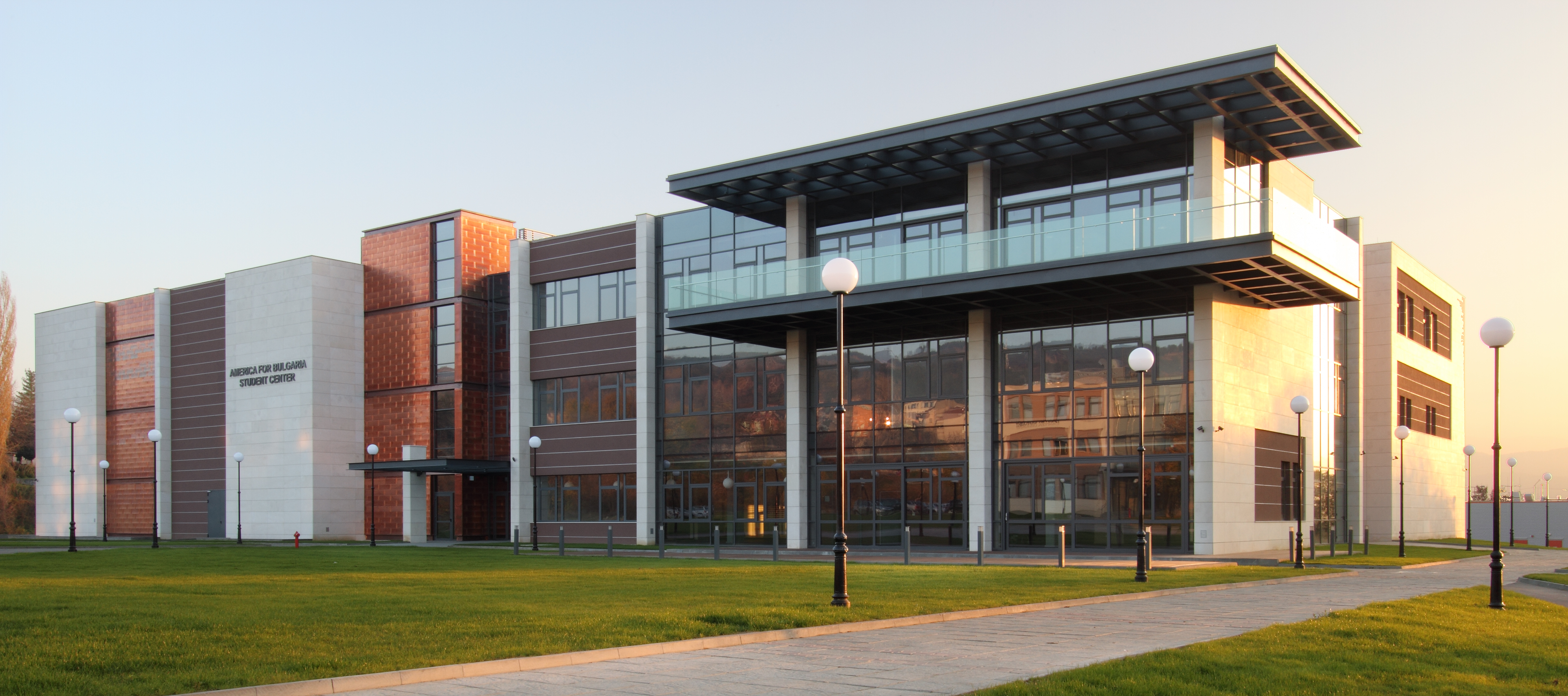
- The America for Bulgaria Student Center
- Type: Private university
- Established: 1991; 35 years ago
- Accreditation: NECHE
- Affiliations: GLAA
- Endowment: $67.4 million (2025)
- President: J.D. Mininger
- Academic staff: 117
- Students: 1,211
- Undergraduates: 1,169
- Postgraduates: 42
- Location: 1 Georgi Izmirliev Sq., Blagoevgrad, Bulgaria
- Campus: Urban
- Colors: White and blue
- Mascot: Griffin
- Website: www.aubg.edu

The American University in Bulgaria (AUBG) is a private university in Blagoevgrad, Bulgaria. Established in 1991, AUBG had 1,211 students (1,169 undergraduate and 42 graduate students) from over 40 countries on 5 continents as of spring 2025.

== History ==
Founded in 1991, the American University in Bulgaria is the first American-style, liberal arts undergraduate education institution in Eastern Europe. The university is a cooperative venture established with the support of the U.S. and Bulgarian governments, the Open Society Institute, the City of Blagoevgrad, and the University of Maine.

When it opened its doors in September 1991, AUBG's first-year class was 208 students and it had 16 full-time faculty members. Nowadays, it has around 1000 students from over 40 countries.

By May 2019, twenty-four classes of around 5,000 students had graduated from AUBG.

== Funding ==
The university has three sources of funding: its endowment which came largely from gifts from the United States Agency for International Development (USAID) and the Soros Foundation, gifts, and tuition.

== Accreditation ==
Baccalaureate degrees conferred by AUBG are accredited in both Bulgaria and the United States. AUBG is institutionally accredited in the United States from the New England Commission of Higher Education. The university also issues a European Diploma Supplement (part of Europass), which confers automatic recognition of the AUBG degree throughout Europe.

== Rankings ==
University rankings

Regional – Overall
- QS Emerging Europe and Central Asia: 156 (2022)

For consecutive years, AUBG holds the top position nationally in Business Administration, European Studies, Journalism and Mass Communication, and Political Science and International Relations. The Economics, Computer Science, and Information Systems programs rank second in Bulgaria.

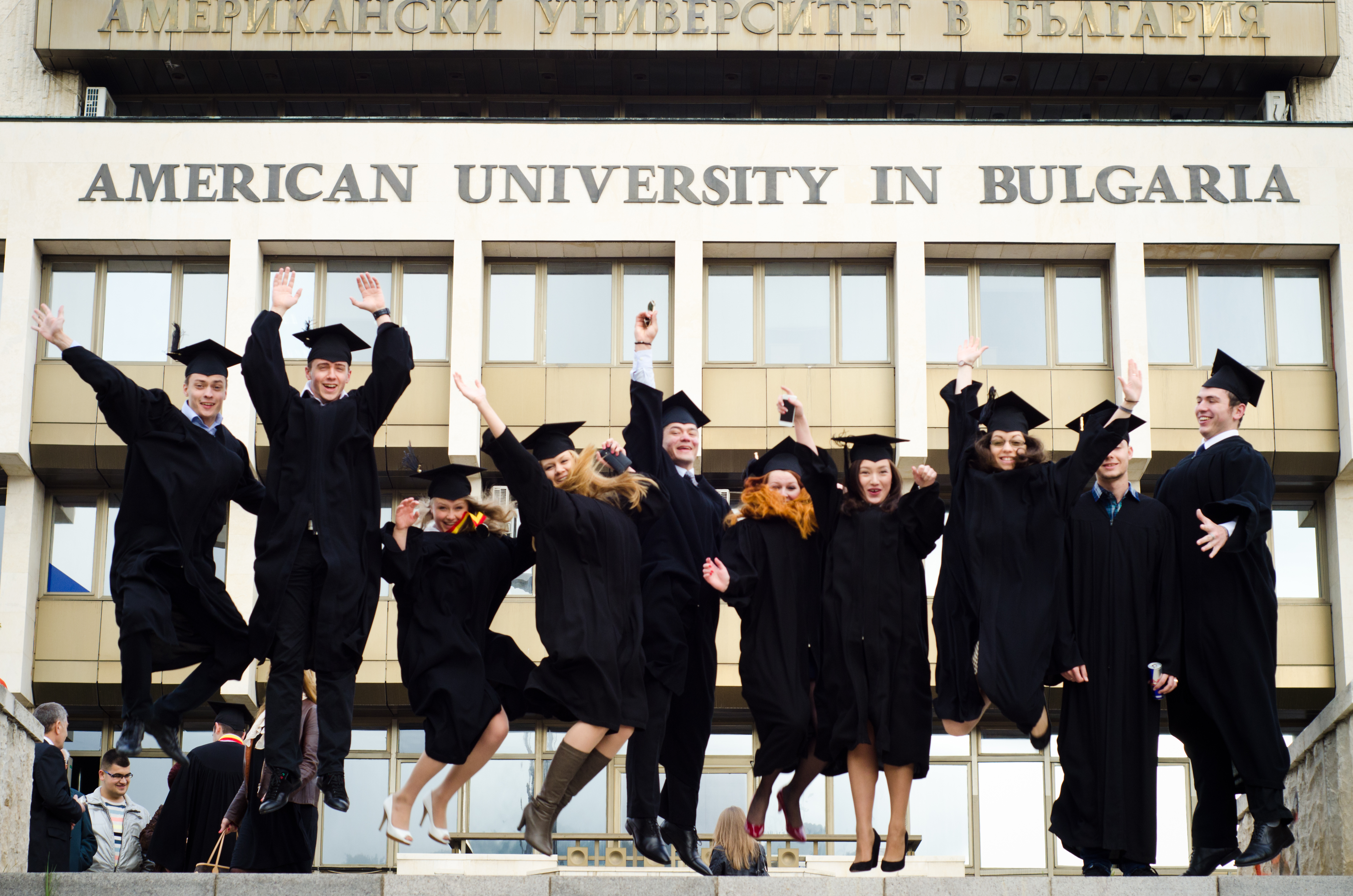
Graduating students

A university survey in 2016 found that sixty-five percent of graduating students received more than one job offer or higher degree program acceptance letter when they applied for work or a higher degree upon completing their studies at AUBG. Approximately 20 percent of graduates earned more than $100,000/year and over 20 percent of alumni from 1995 to 2005 who were currently working in the U.S. earned more than $250,000/year.

== Academics ==
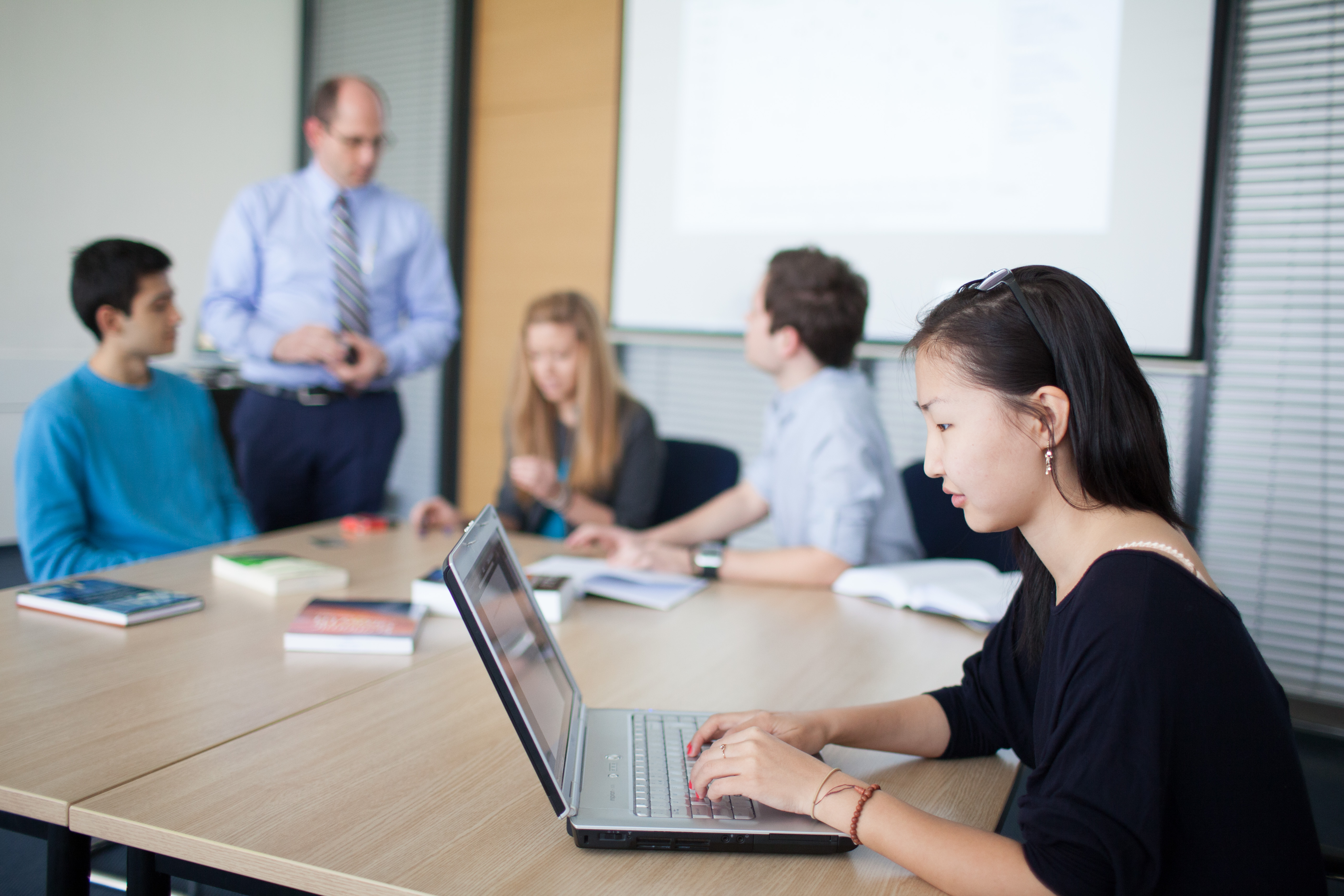
Classroom Environment

The university follows the traditional American-style of education liberal arts. More than 60% of the students graduate from AUBG with two majors or a major and a minor. More than half of graduating seniors complete double majors, while many undergraduates supplement their main field of study with a minor in one of 19 disciplines offered at AUBG.

The university employs about 70 faculty members from over 15 countries.

AUBG students can spend a year or a semester at one of several hundred universities in the United States through the International Student Exchange Program (ISEP). In Europe, AUBG is the holder of a standard Erasmus Charter and has bilateral Erasmus Programme agreements with over 50 institutions.

=== Graduate programs ===
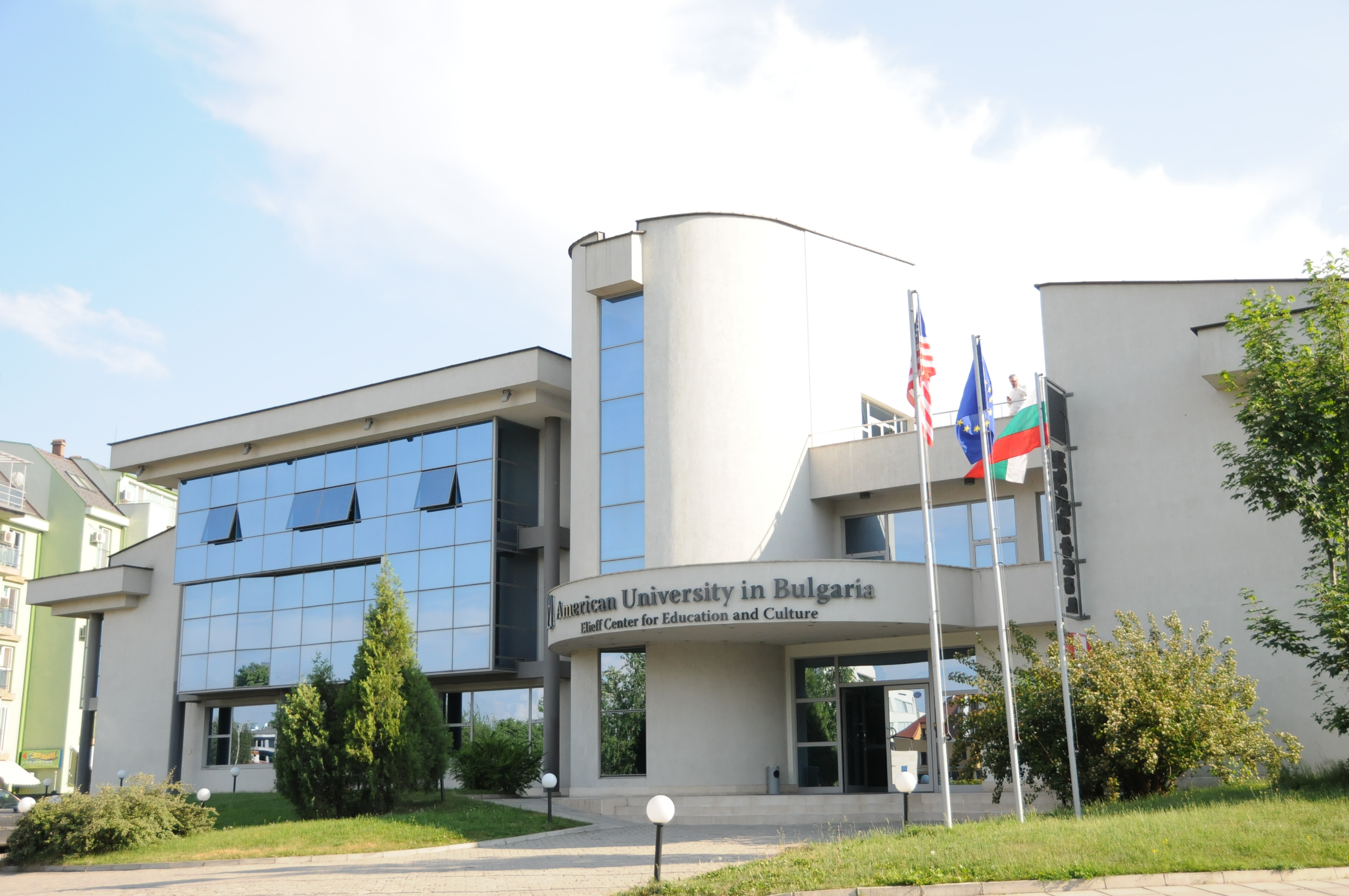
Elieff Center for Education and Culture in Sofia

In addition to its undergraduate programs, the university offers an Executive MBA program in Sofia.

=== Non-degree programs ===
The university offers a number of training courses. Most of these are held in the AUBG Elieff Center for Education and Culture in Sofia.

The Blagoevgrad-based English Language Institute offers English-language instruction at all levels and for all ages year-round.

=== Tuition and scholarships ===
AUBG offers spring and fall semester admission on a rolling basis.

The university offers need- and merit-based aid to deserving students.

The AUBG Tchaprachikoff scholarship provides partial funding for tuition for up to two years for Bulgarian AUBG graduates who are admitted to a graduate program in any one of the top 20 national universities in the United States or to any one of the top 20 U.S. schools in the respective fields.

== Campus ==
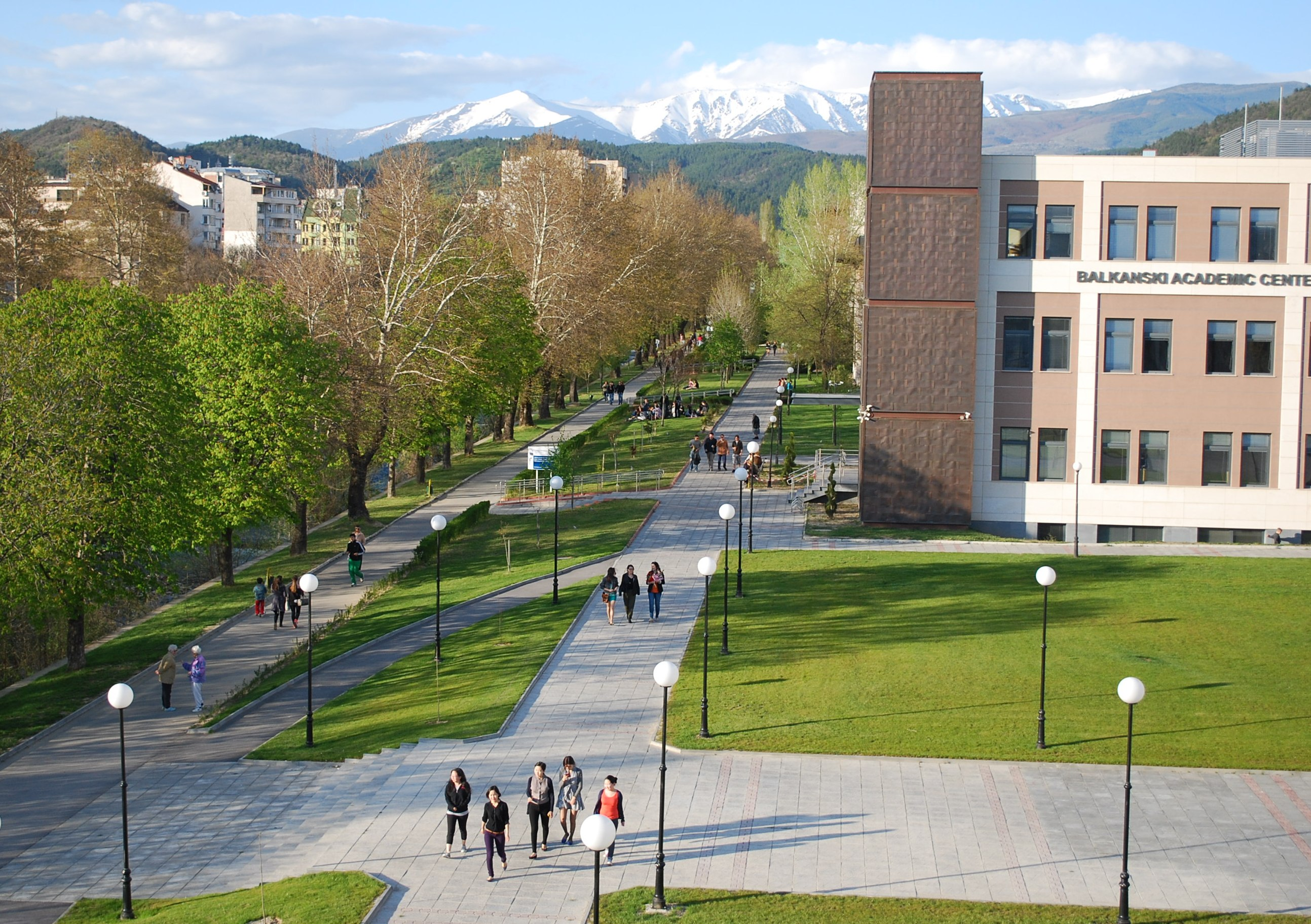
AUBG Campus

The Skaptopara campus in Blagoevgrad is home to the university undergraduate programs. It includes three residence halls; Balkanski Academic Center, which houses classrooms, computer labs, and offices; Panitza Library, the largest English-language library in Southeast Europe; and the America for Bulgaria Students center.

The residence halls have aerobic rooms, music practice rooms, multipurpose rooms, billiard and ping pong areas, several television lounges, outside decks, kitchens, and cafes.

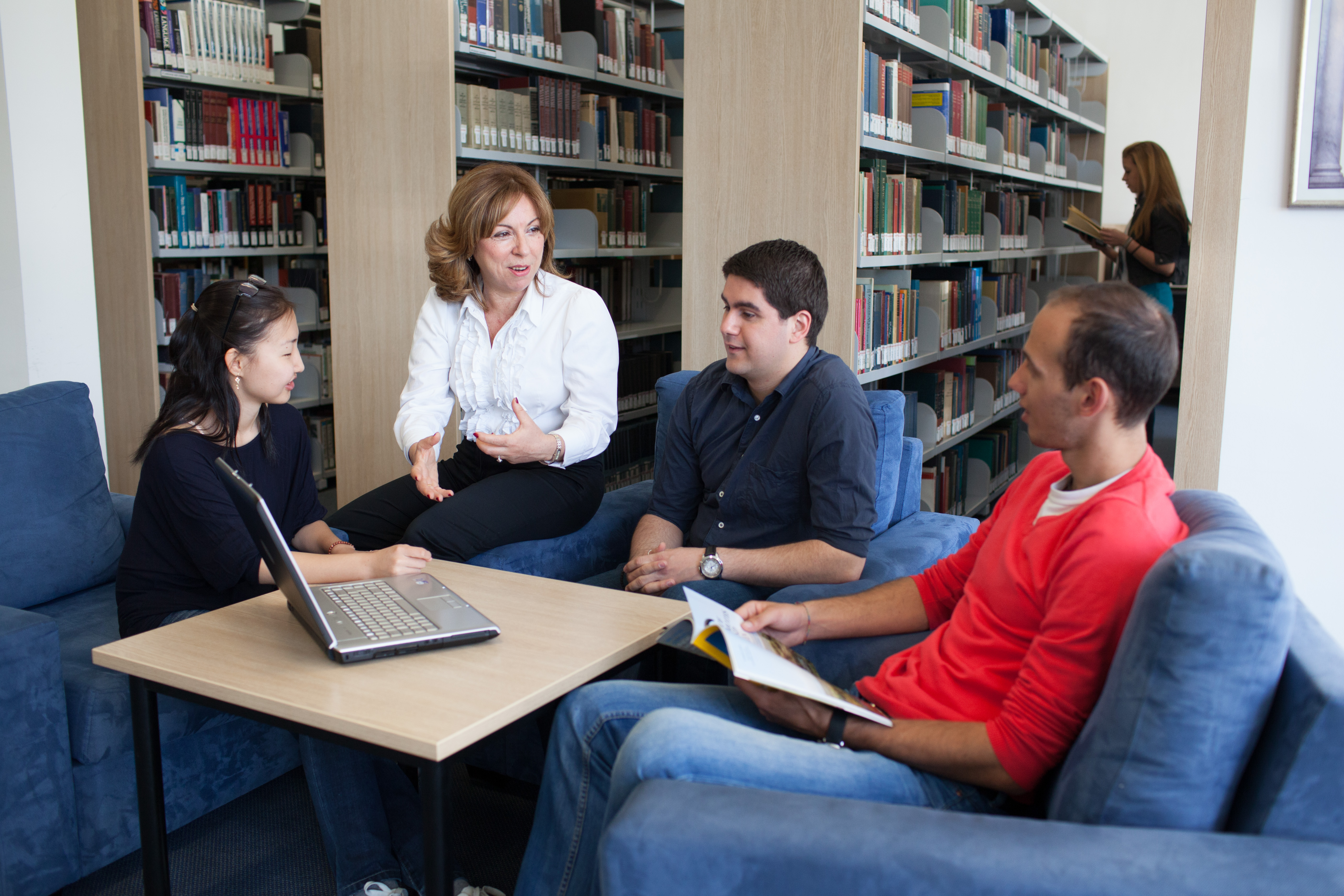
Panitza Library

The Panitza Library is named for John Dimitry Panitza, a Bulgarian philanthropist and AUBG founder. Through Panitza's efforts, the library developed into the largest English-language library in the region.

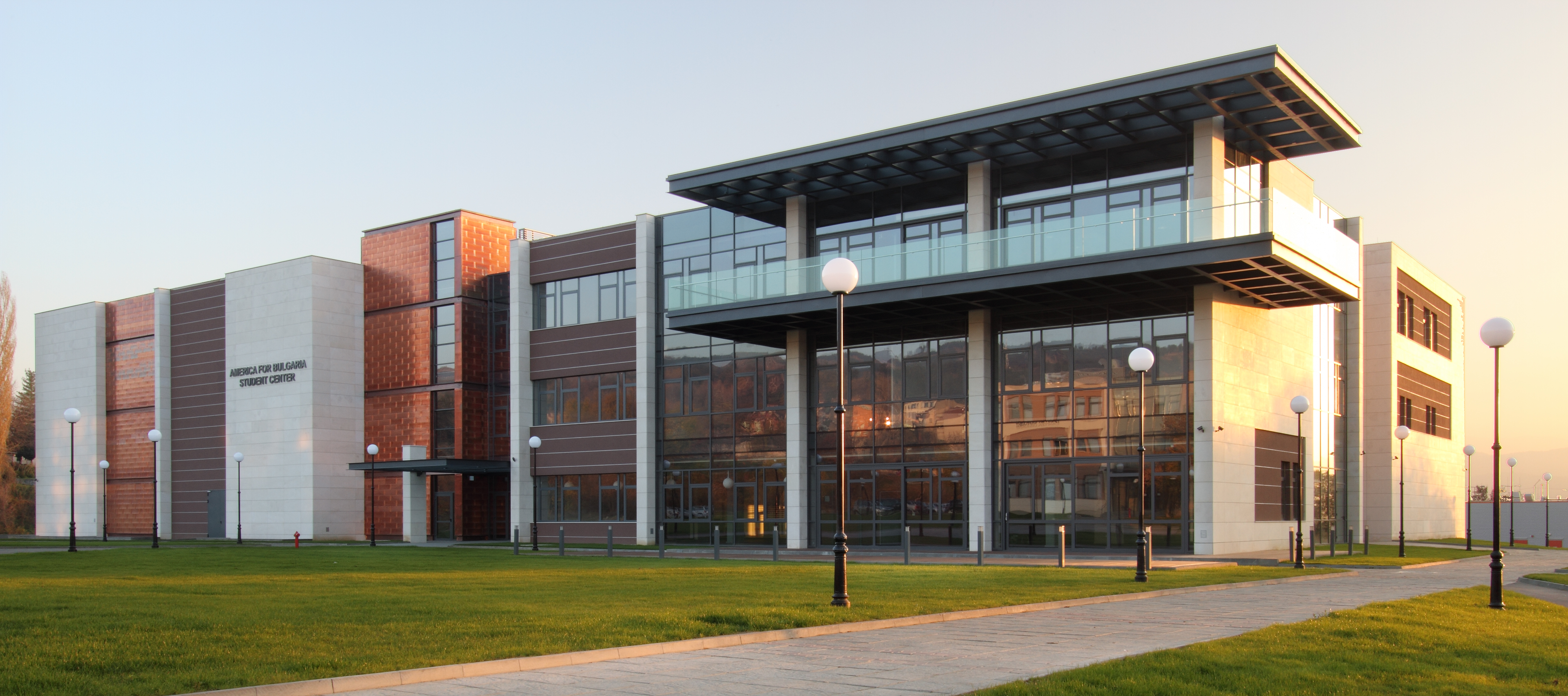
America for Bulgaria Student Center Won Building of the Year Award in 2013

The Balkanski Academic Center bears the name of physicist Minko Balkanski The center was dedicated to Professor Balkanski and his family in 2010.

== Student life ==
AUBG students can join clubs, student media, sports teams, and activities such as theatre, AUBG Choir, debating, Model United Nations simulations, and public service.

=== Student government ===
Established in 1991, the AUBG Student Government is a directly elected representative body of the students at AUBG. The Student Government holds its sessions weekly. It has a yearly budget, which is allocated among the student clubs and organizations.

=== Clubs ===
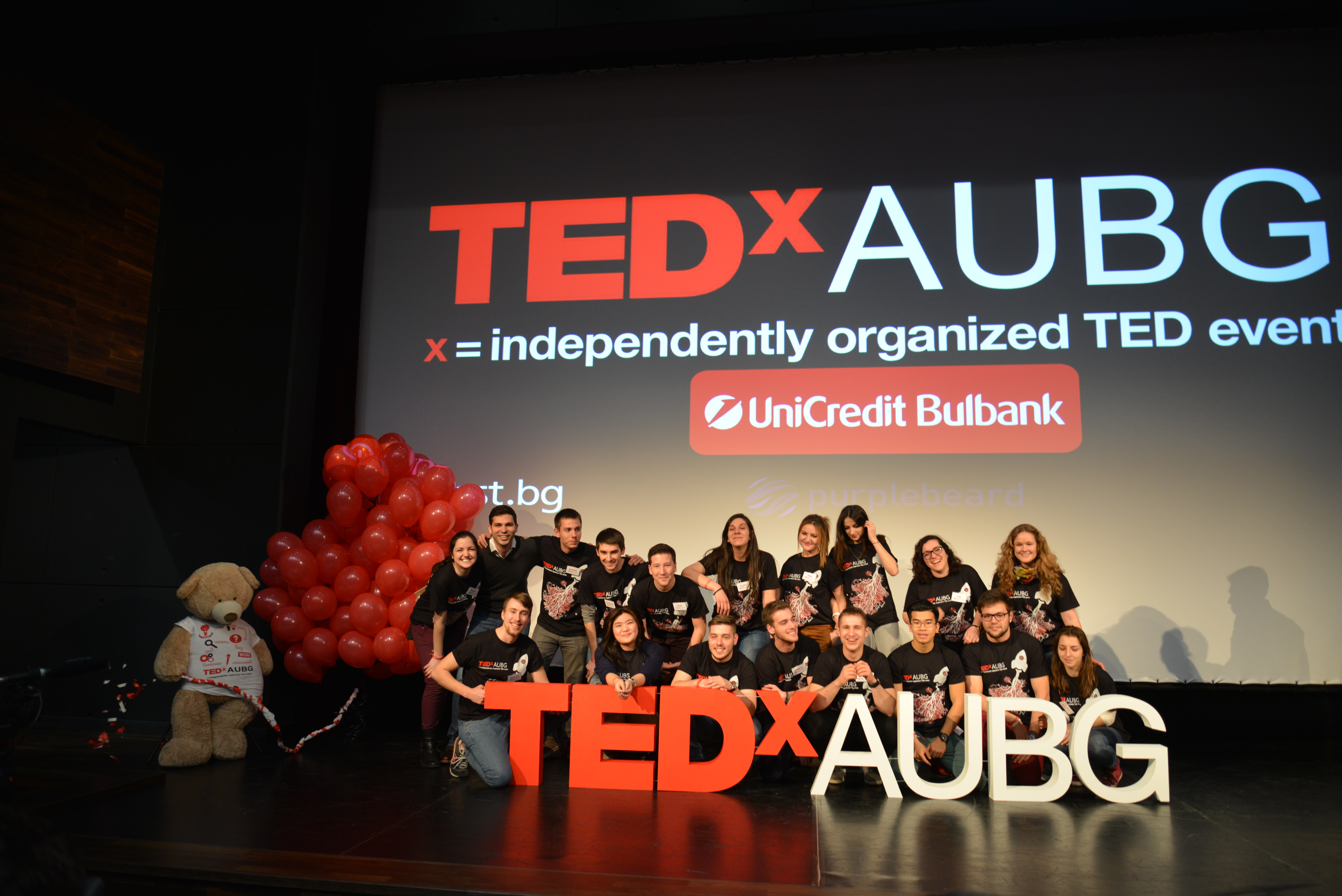
TEDxAUBG

AUBG hosts chapters of international organizations, such as People to People International, AIESEC, the Phi Beta Delta Honor Society, and the Association for Computing Machinery. Social and sports organizations, such as the AUBG Olympics and others like More Honors, Debate Club, Rock Jamming Club, Polygon Club, Business Club and Investment Management Club are also available.

The Better Community Club members work on social projects. Their activities include a multi-year educational project at Blagoevgrad's "St. Nikolay Mirlikliyski" orphanage; fundraising campaigns for local centers for people with disabilities and a local family afflicted with serious health problems; and others.

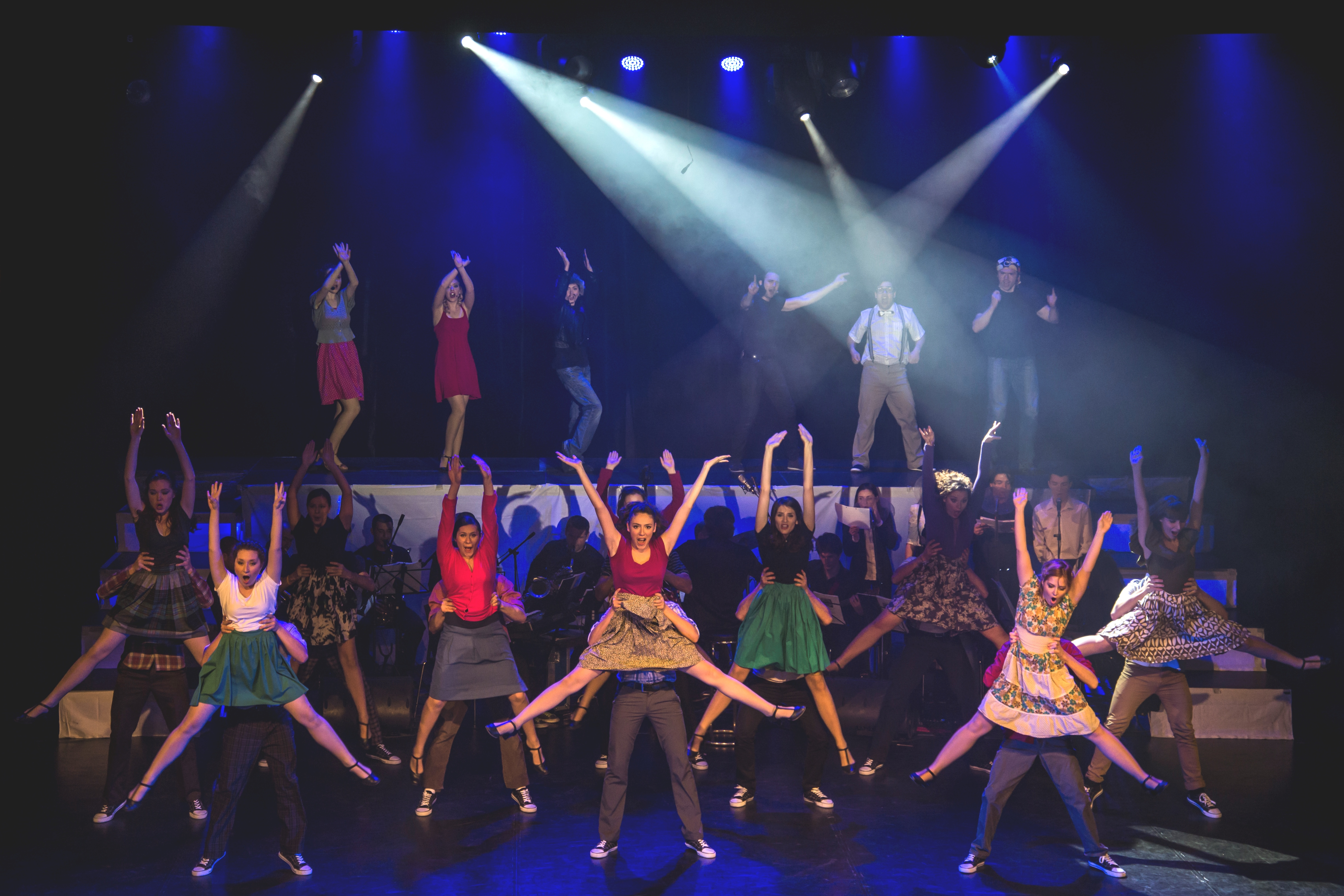
AUBG Musical

The AUBG Choir was created in 1993 by its director – associate professor of music – Hristo Krotev. The choir has received a number of national and international awards.

The Broadway Performance Club stages musicals for the students and faculty every year. The AUBG community has already seen Chicago, West Side Story, Hairspray, Moulin Rouge, Grease, Memphis, All Shook Up, Burlesque, Catch me If You Can and Hair. After its performances in Blagoevgrad, the musical goes on a tour around the country.

The Psychology Club aims to spread awareness about mental health on campus, while also organizing events, workshops and guest lectures related to Psychology.

=== Acceleration Program Elevate ===
AUBG launched its first Acceleration Program Elevate in 2019. This helps student entrepreneurs and recent alumni start their first businesses. During the four-month program, teams of two to four AUBGers have access to many workshops, training and a mentorship network of experienced entrepreneurs and AUBG alumni. Each team gets $5000 as capital to kick-start their development. Designed to provide students with startup guidance, the accelerator doubles as a way to support the university: AUBG will have a 5% stake in each company that comes out of the program.

=== Student media ===
There are several student media on campus (broadcast, print, and electronic) which chronicle university events and town life, among them student newspaper AUBG Daily, and Bulgaria's oldest private radio station Radio AURA.

=== Research and innovation ===
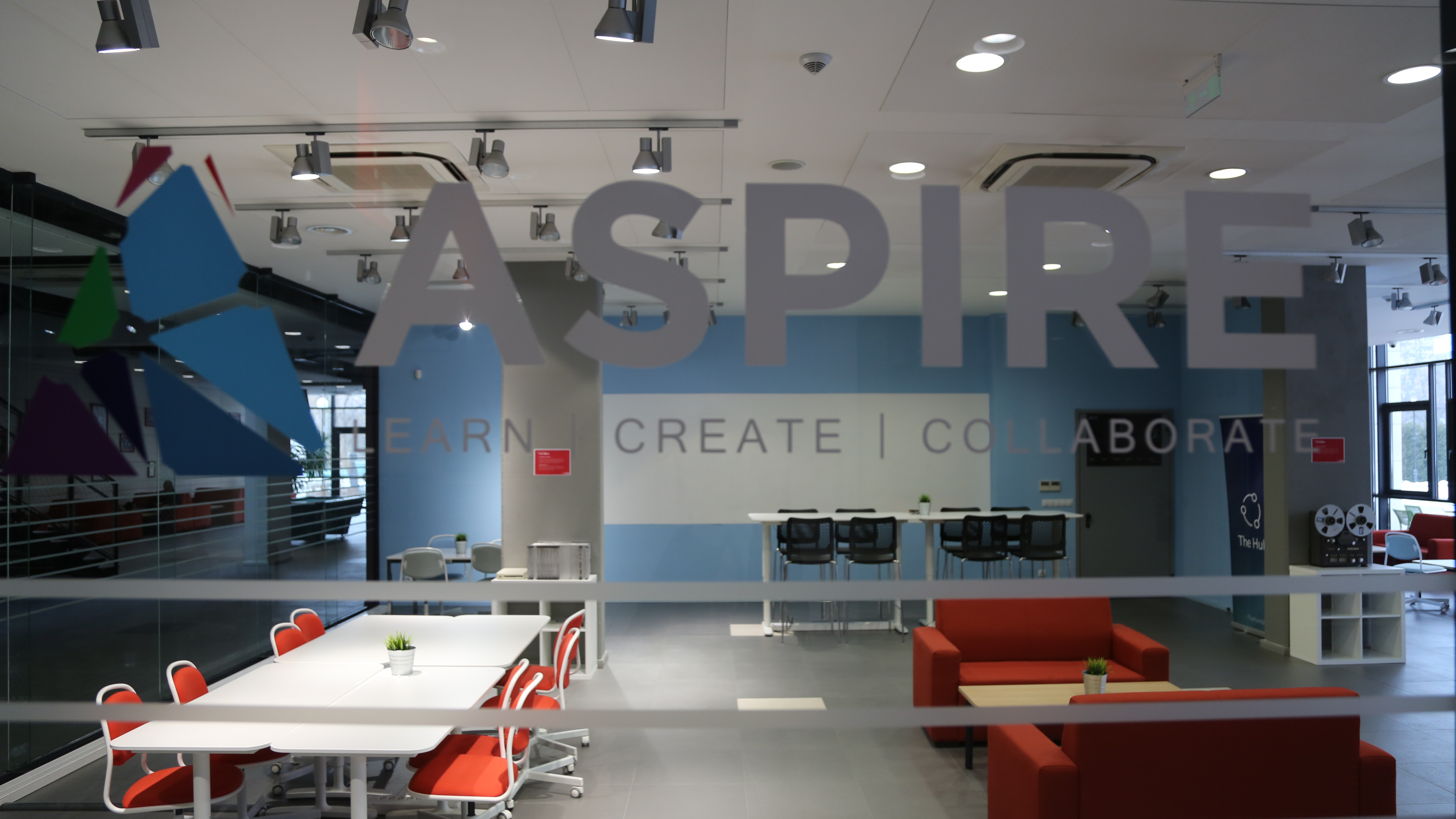
Innovation Hub "Aspire"

Students participate in conferences and competitions worldwide, such as the Carroll Round International Student Research conference at Georgetown University, USA and the annual Microsoft's Imagine Cup competition. The Goldman Sachs Global Leaders Program has repeatedly recognized AUBG students’ potential. AUBG hosts its own research conference every year, where students and faculty present research projects.

In Fall 2016, the innovation hub "Aspire" opened doors. It encourages AUBG students to create something, whether it is a start-up business, a tech venture or a book. "Aspire" is a shared working space that aims to foster the exchange of ideas among the AUBG community and to facilitate the transformation of creative visions into reality. The hub is a home of many events related to innovation, inventiveness and inspiration.

=== Athletics ===
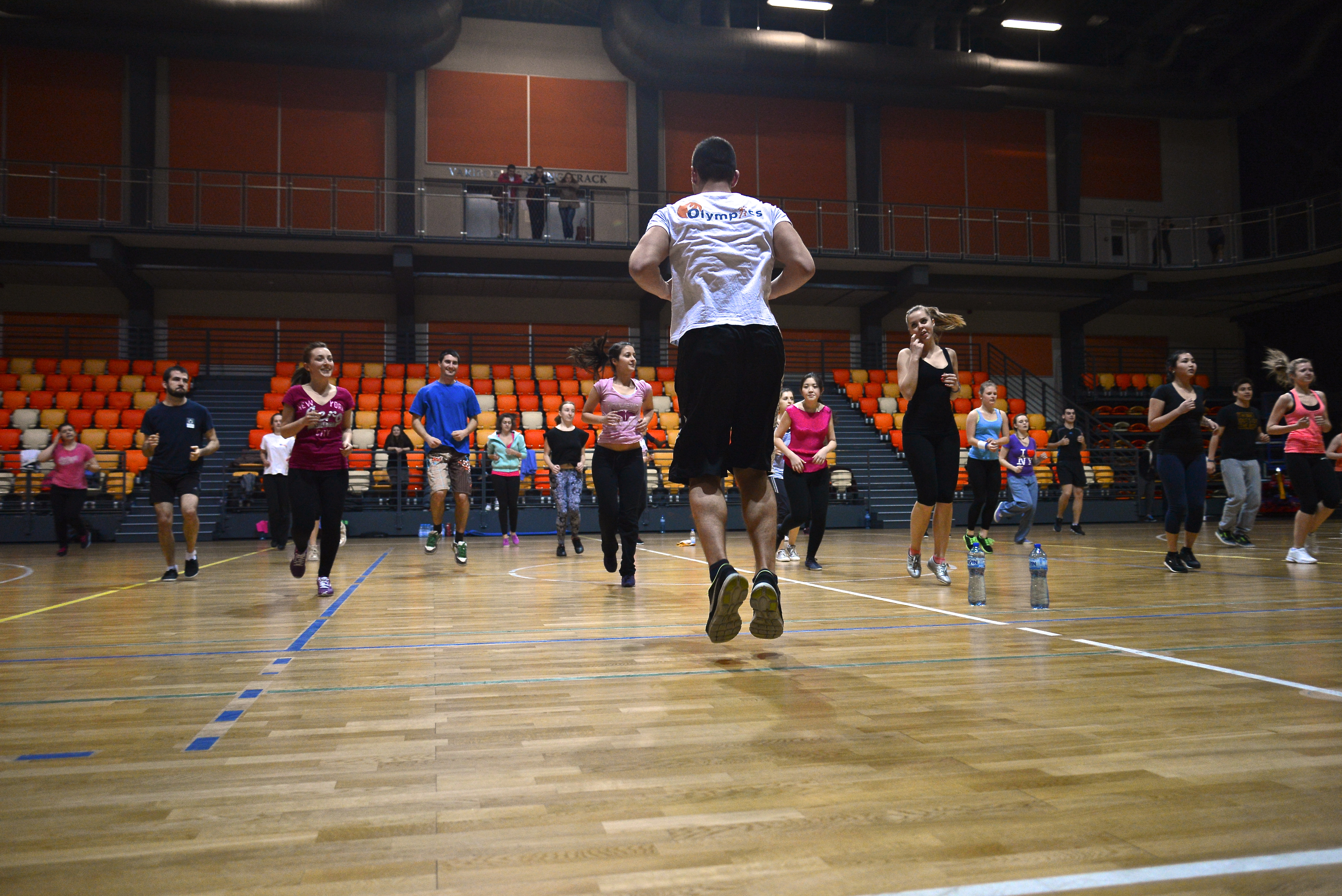
ABF Sports Hall

Every year, AUBG holds its own Olympic Games. In the AUBG Olympics, students compete in sports disciplines, such as long jump, soccer, basketball, volleyball, arm wrestling, tug-of-war, horseshoe throwing, and boxing. The university has its own American football team, the AUBG Griffins. Residence halls host table tennis, billiards, aerobic fitness rooms, and gym facilities. There are sports facilities with a basketball court, a football field, two tennis courts and a volleyball court. Those interested in skiing, hiking, horseback riding, boxing, kickboxing, aerobics, volleyball, baseball, yoga, taekwondo, softball, and karate have formed student clubs and intramural teams. Every semester there are soccer and basketball intramural competitions.

=== Lecture series and conferences ===
The university hosts business practitioners, scholars and public figures year-round, among them President Rosen Plevneliev (2012–2017) and Bulgaria's EU Commissioner Kristalina Georgieva. Some of the university lecture series include the Distinguished Lecturers Series, the Visiting Poets and Writers Series and the Book Presentations and Readings Series. The American University in Bulgaria regularly hosts international conferences such as AMICAL, ISIH and GLAA.

== Notable people ==
- Elizabeth Kostova, former AUBG board member, AUBG University Council member since 2011, author of the bestselling novels The Historian and The Swan Thieves
- Aernout van Lynden, a Dutch-British journalist with over twenty years of experience as a war correspondent in the Middle East and the Balkans, former AUBG professor
- Sohel Taj (born 5 January 1970) is a retired Bangladesh Awami League politician and former State Minister of Home Affairs. He is the son of Bangladesh's first Prime Minister Tajuddin Ahmad.Bangladesh Awami League. He has three sisters, Sharmin Ahmad Reepi, Simeen Hussain Rimi and Mahjabin Ahmad Mimi. He obtained bachelor of business administration degree from the American University in Bulgaria and masters from Gordon University in the United States in 2008.
- Ralitsa Vassileva, anchor for CNN International, Atlanta, USA, AUBG Doctor of Humane Letters (2001)
- Zhelyu Zhelev, first democratically elected president of the Republic of Bulgaria (1990–1997), AUBG Doctor of Humane Letters (1995)
- John K. Menzies, a founder of the American University in Bulgaria (AUBG) and a former Public Affairs Officer at the US embassy in Sofia

== Notable alumni ==
- Christo Grozev, AUBG graduate, Class of 1995, Bulgarian investigative journalist and author. He is the lead Russia investigator with Bellingcat, focusing on security threats, extraterritorial clandestine operations, and the weaponization of information. Christo Grozev and team behind "Navalny" won Oscar for best documentary in 2023.
- Manol Peykov, AUBG graduate, Class of 1995, Managing Partner at Janet 45 Print and Publishing. After the beginning of the Russian invasion of Ukraine in early 2022, Manol started collecting donations for the Ukrainian cause through his personal Facebook account. He's collected more than 1.5 mln leva to date, plus another 1.5 mln for those affected by the massive earthquake in Turkey and Northern Syria on 6 February 2023.
- Deyan Vassilev, AUBG graduate, Class of 1995, Founder and CEO of the leading financial comparison portal in Bulgaria, MoitePari.bg and in Romania: Finzoom.ro, as well as the country's leading mortgage intermediary company Creditland.
- Dilian Pavlov, AUBG graduate, Class of 1995, co-founder of Dynamo Software, director at Netage Solutions and Owner, Netage Solutions.
- Stefan Ivanov, AUBG graduate, Class of 1995, entrepreneur, co-founder the investment banking boutique Challenger Capital Management. Prior to establishing his own business, Stefan held leadership positions at Citibank in London, Brazil, South Korea, and Tunisia and most recently as CEO of Citibank in Bulgaria. Stefan Ivanov and his 17-year-old son Maxim Crossed the Atlantic to Support Donor Transplantation.
- Elvin Guri, AUBG graduate, Class of 1996, CEO of Empower Capital Advisors and Manager of Empower Capital Fund I, a Jeremie-supported fund investing in Bulgarian lower and mid-market industrial companies. Previously with PwC and EBRD, in 2001–2002 he co-founded JetFinance International that became the largest consumer finance lender in South East Europe (sold to BNP Paribas Personal Finance in 2007).
- Nikolay Marinov, AUBG graduate, Class of 1996, Associate Professor of Political Science, University of Houston.
- Daniel Tomov, AUBG graduate, Class of 1997, Founding Partner at Eleven Ventures, an early-stage VC that has since 2012 invested in over 150 of the most promising technology startups in Southeast Europe.
- Asparuh Koev, AUBG graduate, Class of 1998, Founder and Chief Strategy Officer of the award-winning logistics AI platform Transmetrics. Since 2013, Transmetrics has grown from four co-founders to a team of more than 35 highly skilled employees working with renowned cargo and logistics companies across the globe. The company won the Forbes Best Startup Award in 2014 for its innovative work.
- Vassil Terziev, AUBG graduate, Class of 2001, Managing Partner at Eleven Ventures, an early stage VC fund focused on the SEE region. Prior to Eleven, Vassil served as Chief Innovation Officer of Progress Software (NASDAQ: PRGS) which he joined with the acquisition of Telerik, the co-company he co-founded in 2002. In 2013 US Progress Software acquired Telerik in a record $263 million deal. Terziev is the mayor of the capital city of Bulgaria, Sofia. He was elected in 2023.
- Svetozar Georgiev, AUBG graduate, Class of 2000, co-founder of Telerik, Telerik Academy and Campus X. In 2013 US Progress Software acquired Telerik in a record $263 million deal. After spending 14 years building a global software company, he is now dedicated to sharing his learnings with the next generation of Bulgarian entrepreneurs.
- Monika Evstatieva, AUBG graduate, Class of 2005, Senior Producer at NPR's Investigations Unit. Since 2006, Evstatieva has worked on various programs and NPR, including Morning Edition, All Things Considered, Weekend Edition and Tell Me More with Michel Martin. She has traveled throughout the United States to cover politics and the environment and has reported in Ukraine, Afghanistan, Russia, the Balkans and Western Europe.
- Svetla Baeva, AUBG graduate, Class of 2007, Campaigns Director at Fine Acts, a global non-profit creative studio for social impact. Over the last ten years, she has worked on championing human rights and social issues at a number of local and international organizations, including the Bulgarian Helsinki Committee and the United Nations Development Programme for Europe and Central Asia.
- Rositsa Zaimova, AUBG graduate, Class of 2011, Partner and co-founder at Dalberg Data Insights (DDI), a data analytics firm based between Brussels, Nairobi, and Kampala, that helps governments and development agencies use data to better target, implement and evaluate their programs and initiatives. Rositsa was named one of Forbes’ 30 Under 30 Social entrepreneurs in Europe in 2018.
- Anush Babajanyan, AUBG graduate, Class of 2006, Armenian photojournalist, member of VII Photo
- Uładzimir Katkoŭski, founder of the Belarusian Wikipedia, who worked for the Belarusian edition of Radio Free Europe
- Evgeny Morozov, AUBG graduate, Class of 2005, author of The Net Delusion: The Dark Side of Internet Freedom (January 2011); a contributing editor to Foreign Policy, contributor to The Economist, The Wall Street Journal, Newsweek, The Washington Post, International Herald Tribune, Le Monde, and many others; visiting scholar at Stanford University

== See also ==
- Balkan Universities Network
