= Fanini =

Fanini may refer to:

- Fanini (surname), an Italian surname
- Fanini–Wührer, Italian professional cycling team active between 1984 and 1985
- Fanini–Seven Up, Italian professional cycling team active from 1984 to 1988
- Pro Cycling Team Fanini, cycling team founded in 2017 based in Albania
- S.C. Michela Fanini Rox, professional cycling team based in Italy

== See also ==
- Fani (disambiguation)
