= Stehling =

Stehling is a surname. It may refer to:

- Felix Stehling (1927–2012), American businessman and restaurateur
- Henry J. Stehling (1918–2001), Brigadier General in the United States Air Force
- Moritz Stehling (born 1987), German football player
