= Geek Pride Day =

Commemorative day

- Observed by: Geeks worldwide
- Type: Cultural
- Significance: Non-denominational holiday celebrating geek culture
- Celebrations: Role-playing games, parades, cosplay
- Date: May 25
- Next time: May 25, 2025
- Frequency: Annual
- Related to: Nerd, geek, science fiction

Geek Pride Day is an initiative to promote geek culture, celebrated annually on May 25.

The initiative originated in Spain in 2006 as (Spanish: Día del orgullo friki) and spread around the world via the Internet.

== Origins ==
Tim McEachern organized unconnected events called Geek Pride Festival and/or Geek Pride Day 1998 to 2000 at a bar in Albany, New York, which are sometimes seen as a prelude to Geek Pride Day.

Dick Morley, a "father" of the programmable logic controller, organised Geek Pride Days at The Barn, his retreat in New Hampshire, as early as 2001. He describes it in his book, Techshock – Future under repair (ISA, 2009). He held them on the longest day of the year and he wrote of Geek Pride Day (Or Outing Engineers in the Bush!) on page 19.

In 2006, the Spanish blogger Germán Martínez known online as señor Buebo organized the first celebration. The day was celebrated for the first time in Spain and on the Internet, drawing attention from mainstream media. The biggest concentration took place in Madrid, where 300 geeks demonstrated their pride together with a human Pac-Man. A manifesto was created to celebrate the first Geek Pride Day, which included a list of the basic rights and responsibilities of geeks.

== 2008 ==
In 2008, Geek Pride Day was officially celebrated in the U.S., where it was heralded by numerous bloggers, coalescing around the launch of the Geek Pride Day website. Math author, Euler Book Prize winner, and geek blogger John Derbyshire announced that he would be appearing in the Fifth Avenue parade on the prime number float, dressed as number 57.

== See also ==
- Towel Day – celebrated on the same date since 2001
- Star Wars Day
- Pi Day
- Glorious Twenty-fifth of May
