= Fanini (surname) =

Fanini is an Italian surname. Notable people with the surname include:

- Edewin Fanini (born 1986), Italian Brazilian footballer
- Michela Fanini (1973–1994), Italian racing cyclist
