= Persecution of Wikipedia editors in Belarus =

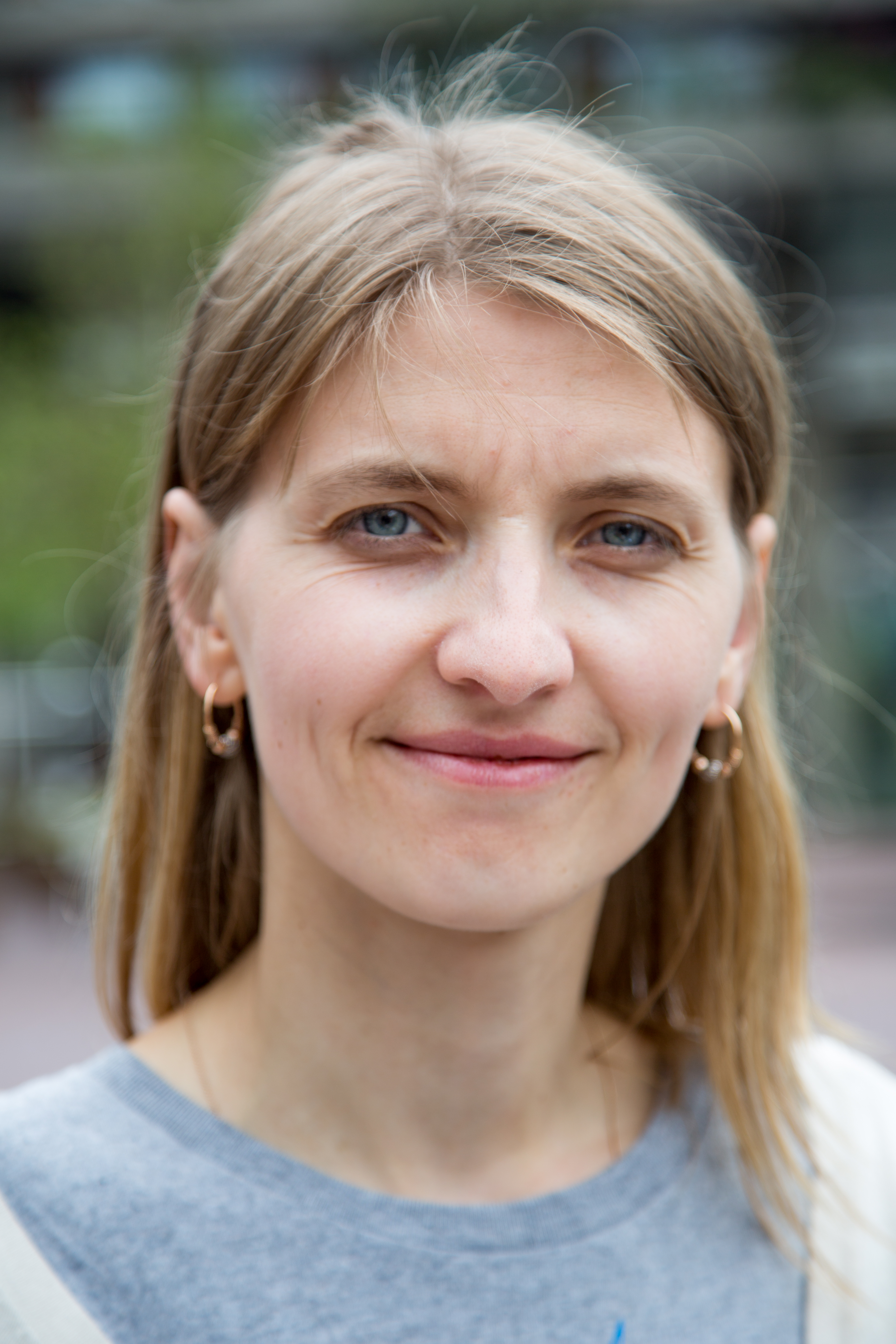
Volha Sitnik, an administrator of the Belarusian Wikipedia, was detained in May 2025 for her wiki-related activity and has been recognized as a political prisoner by human rights organizations.

Editors of the Belarusian Wikipedia have been targeted and subjected to politically motivated arrests, detentions, and other forms of pressure by the Belarusian authorities. These actions, documented since the early 2020s, are viewed as part of a broader wave of repression against civil society, independent media, and activists in Belarus, aimed at controlling the information space and restricting citizens' access to independent sources of information.

== Historical context ==
The Belarusian Wikipedia, established in 2004, has played a significant role in preserving and promoting the Belarusian language, culture, and history. During the political crisis following the 2020 presidential elections, authorities intensified their control over the information space, targeting independent media and online resources. Wikipedia articles covering protests and government actions, especially those contradicting the official state narrative, became subject to increased scrutiny. The Belarusian Wikipedia remained a platform with relative freedom of information and pluralism of opinion, which made it a focus of state attention.

In 2025, prior to a wave of arrests of Wikipedia editors, state media launched an information campaign accusing the Belarusian Wikipedia of pro-Western bias. Prominent propagandist Lyudmila Gladkaya was among those actively promoting these narratives in the Belarusian information field.

== Chronology ==
Persecution of Belarusian Wikipedians has taken various forms. Arrests and detentions of administrators and active contributors have been recorded, often justified by charges related to their online activities. Editors have faced both administrative and criminal liability under articles concerning the distribution of "extremist materials", "discrediting the Republic of Belarus", or "organizing actions that grossly violate public order".

- In 2022, editors Mark Bernstein and Uladzislau Chahovich were detained. Bernstein was accused of "organizing and preparing actions that grossly violate public order" due to his editing of articles related to Russia's invasion of Ukraine and was sentenced to three years of restricted freedom. According to law enforcement, he was disseminating "fake information about the Russian Armed Forces."
- On April 7, 2022, Pavel Pernikov, an editor of several language editions of Wikipedia (including two Belarusian ones), was sentenced to two years in a reinforced regime penal colony for online posts "discrediting the Republic of Belarus," including two edits to Wikipedia articles about political repression in Belarus.
- In August 2024, the court of Leninsky district of Mogilev declared "extremist" the telegram channel Вікіпедыя, which republished most popular articles from Belarusian Wikipedia.
- In December 2024, an editor using the pseudonym Stary Jolup, who contributed to the Tarashkevitsa (Belarusian Latin script) section of Wikipedia, was detained.
- On March 13, 2025, an administrator of the Tarashkevitsa-language version of the Belarusian Wikipedia with user name Kazimier Lachnovič disappeared.
- Between April and May 2025, editor Volha Sitnik was detained and later sentenced to ten days of administrative arrest. Later, it became known that Belarusian special services were attempting to recruit individuals to surveil Sviatlana Tsikhanouskaya using compromised social media and messenger accounts belonging to Volha.
- On May 15, 2025, Maksim Lepushenka, one of the oldest administrators of the Belarusian Wikipedia (active since 2007), who specialized in the ancient history of Belarus, was detained.
- In November 2025, the Minsk prosecutor's office announced a two-year prison sentence and fine for a 37-year-old university lecturer for 25 edits made between 2020 and 2025 about the state symbols of the Republic of Belarus, presidential elections and referendums, and the activities of the authorities. Nasha Niva identified him as editor Kazimier Lachnovič. In March 2026, he was one of 250 political prisoners released as a result of negotiations between Alexander Lukashenko and the US Special Envoy for Belarus John Coale.

== International responses ==
Human rights organizations, such as Freedom House, have condemned the actions of Belarusian authorities as an attempt to restrict freedom of speech and access to independent information. In response to the persecution of Wikipedians in Belarus, the Wikipedia community decided to hide the identities of editors who make changes to articles on military and political topics. This means that IP addresses and user account names are no longer visible not only to readers and regular editors, but also to administrators of the Belarusian-language version. The aim of this measure is to protect editors from surveillance and repression by the state.

== Effects of repression ==
According to some editors of Belarusian Wikipedia, attempts by authorities to control the content of the encyclopedia or to spread propaganda have not succeeded due to the platform's internal rules. Arrests and detentions have not led to changes in article content; the administrative rights of detained editors have been temporarily restricted by the Wikipedia community to prevent unauthorized edits. However, human rights defenders have noted a change in the authorities' tactics: since the end of September 2024, information about politically motivated detentions and trials of Wikipedia editors has almost ceased to be published officially, which significantly complicates independent monitoring of the situation.

The atmosphere of intimidation and repression fostered by Belarusian authorities has had a significant negative impact on the functioning of the Belarusian-language Wikipedia. Fear of persecution has led many editors to practice self-censorship or to abandon editing altogether, especially on politically sensitive topics. Some contributors, particularly those residing in Belarus, have been forced to cease their activities on Wikipedia for safety reasons. As a result, the number of active editors has declined, leading to a deterioration in the quality and comprehensiveness of coverage on many socially important topics, especially those concerning the current political situation in the country.

== See also ==
- Human rights issues related to the suppression of the 2020 Belarusian protests
- List of people imprisoned for editing Wikipedia
