= Volha Sitnik =

Belarusian activist

- Вольга Генадзеўна Сітнік
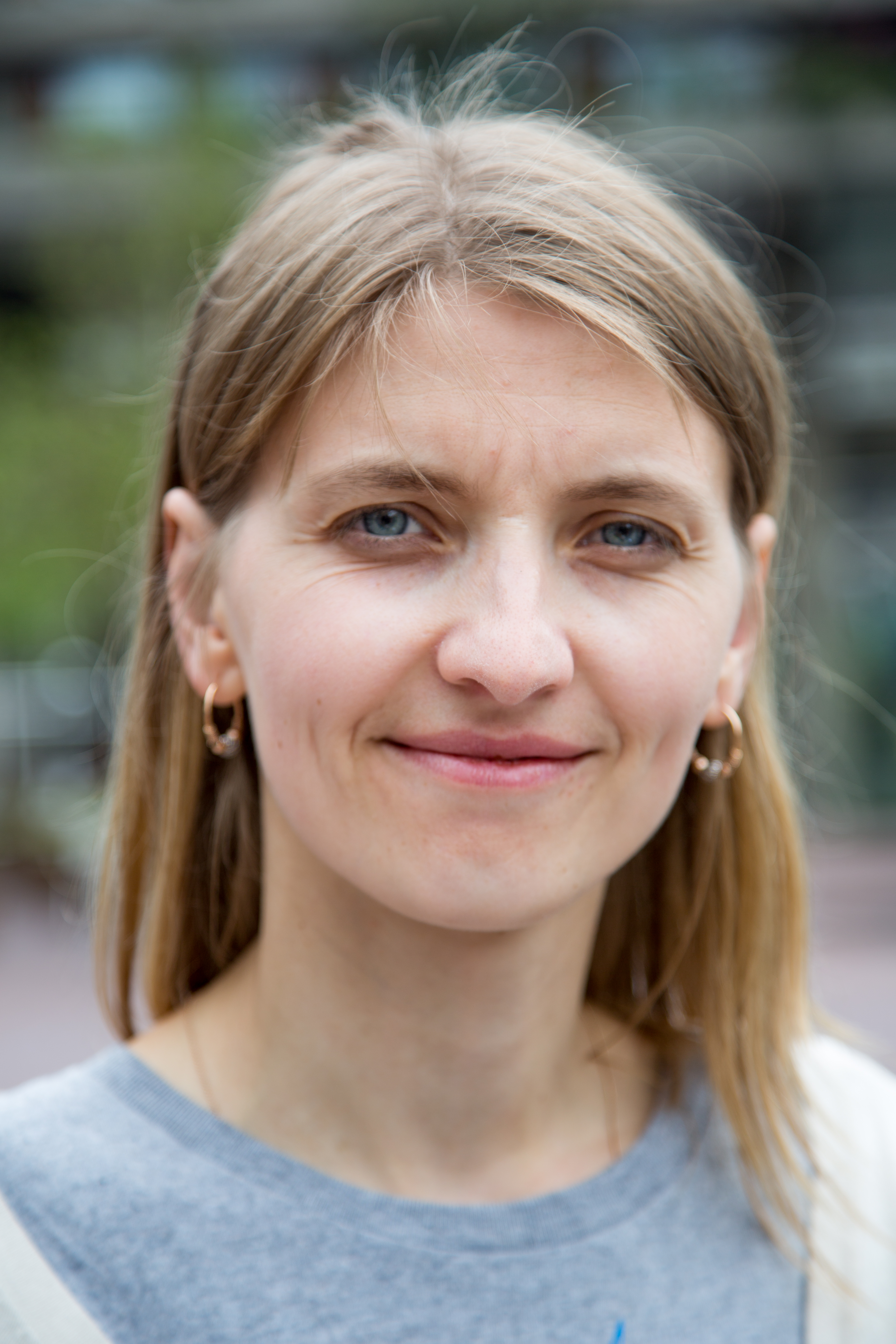
- Born: 24 January 1983 (age 43); Slutsk, Belarus
- Citizenship: Belarus
- Education: BNTU (2005)
- Occupations: activist, Wikipedian

Volha Henadzyeuna Sitnik (born 24 January 1983) is a Belarusian activist and Wikipedian. She is an administrator of the Belarusian Wikipedia in its official orthography. She has contributed thousands of articles and hundreds of thousands of edits. Since April 2025, she has been detained multiple times and, together with other Wikipedians, has been implicated in an unspecified criminal case. She has been recognized as a political prisoner by human rights organizations.

== Biography ==
She was born and raised in Slutsk. She attended Secondary School No. 10 named after S. F. Rubanau. In 2005, she graduated from the Faculty of Information Technology and Robotics, BNTU with a degree in Robotics.

She has been actively editing Wikipedia since 2009 under the pseudonym "Хомелка" (Khomelka). In 2010, she became an administrator of the Belarusian Wikipedia. She mainly writes about the history and culture of Belarus, prominent figures, architectural monuments, and Belarusian flora and fauna. More than twenty of her articles have been awarded "good" or "featured article" status. She is the author of thousands of articles and has made hundreds of thousands of edits. She represented the Belarusian Wikipedia at Wikimania 2014 in London.

In addition to Wikipedia, she also contributes to Wikisource and Wikimedia Commons.

== Persecution ==
On 17 April 2025, Volha stopped responding to messages and editing articles. She was detained, then later released. On 7 May, she was detained again and sentenced to 10 days in the Okrestina detention center. The nature of the charges remains unknown. Sitnik is part of a criminal case involving other administrators of the Belarusian Wikipedia who were imprisoned. In June 2025, various messages about searching for photographers for protest events were sent in diaspora Telegram chats from Volha's account, which had been seized by security forces. On 23 July 2025, she was recognized as a political prisoner by Belarusian human rights organizations.

In December 2025 she was released from pre-trial detention, having been sentenced to house arrest.

== Personal life ==
She is married. She has three children (an older daughter Hanna and younger twins). At the time of her detention in 2025, all were underage.

== See also ==
- List of people imprisoned for editing Wikipedia
- Persecution of Wikipedia editors in Belarus
