= Maksim Lepushenka =

Belarusian Wikipedia editor (born 1974)

- Максім Лепушэнка
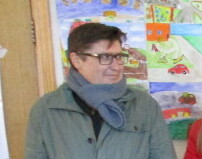
- Born: 1974 (age 51–52); Minsk, Byelorussian SSR, USSR
- Citizenship: Belarus
- Occupation: Wikipedian

Maksim Lepushenka (born 1974, Minsk) is a Belarusian Wikipedian. He is an administrator and bureaucrat of the Belarusian Wikipedia in the official orthography. He was detained on May 15, 2025, and was recognized as a political prisoner by human rights organizations.

== Biography ==
Lepushenka is known on Wikipedia under the pseudonym "Maksim L". He participated in offline meetings where he talked about the Belarusian Wikipedia. He mainly wrote about the ancient history of Belarus, also monitored order in the Belarusian Wikipedia and moderated user disputes. He is author of articles on culture, literature, and biographies of contemporary Belarusian writers.

=== Persecution ===
He was detained at midday on May 15, 2025. According to the media, Maksim's detention was part of the repressions targeting authors and editors of the Belarusian Wikipedia. Maksim was charged under Article 342 of the Criminal Code (organization and preparation of actions that grossly violate public order, or active participation in them). During detention, he was held in Pre-trial Detention Center No. 1. On June 17, 2025, Belarusian human rights organizations recognized him as a political prisoner. In August 2025, he was sentenced to restricted freedom.

== See also ==
- List of people imprisoned for editing Wikipedia
