= Uładzimir Katkoŭski =

Belarusian blogger (1976–2007)

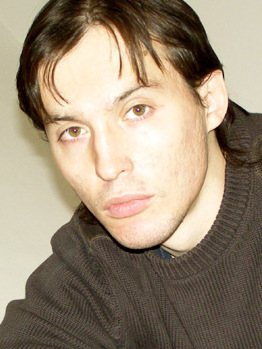
Katkoŭski in January 2006

Uładzimir Łeanidavič Katkoŭski (Belarusian: Уладзімір Леанідавіч Каткоўскі, June 19, 1976, Minsk – May 25, 2007) was a Belarusian blogger, web designer, Wikipedian and website creator.

== Biography ==
Katkoŭski took a degree in computer science at the American University in Bulgaria in Blagoevgrad and later worked as an IT specialist in Budapest and in Frankfurt am Main. From 2002, he worked for the Belarusian edition of Radio Free Europe.

On June 16, 2006, he and his wife had a car crash on a street in Prague. Katkoŭski was in a coma for almost a year until he died on May 26, 2007.

== Activity on the Internet ==
In the mid-1990s, Katkoŭski became one of the pioneers of the Belarusian speaking Internet. In the late 1990s, together with his future wife and other Belarusian Internet users, he created the Belarusian historical website Litvania that had notable popularity. Katkoŭski was one of the first and most popular bloggers in Belarusian language known as rydel23. In 2006, he was awarded by the Belarusian top web portal TUT.by for his blog br23.net.

Katkoŭski created the websites Pravapis.org (about issues concerning Belarusian language) and Martyraloh Biełarusi - "The Belarusian Martyrologe" about victims of Stalinist terror in Belarus. He translated the interface of Google into Belarusian, and was one of the founders of the Belarusian Wikipedia.

He was the creator and administrator of the website of the Belarusian edition of Radio Free Europe.

== See also ==
- List of Wikipedia people
