= Belarusian Wikipedia =

Belarusian-language editions of Wikipedia

Belarusian Wikipedia Беларуская Вікіпэдыя Беларуская Вікіпедыя

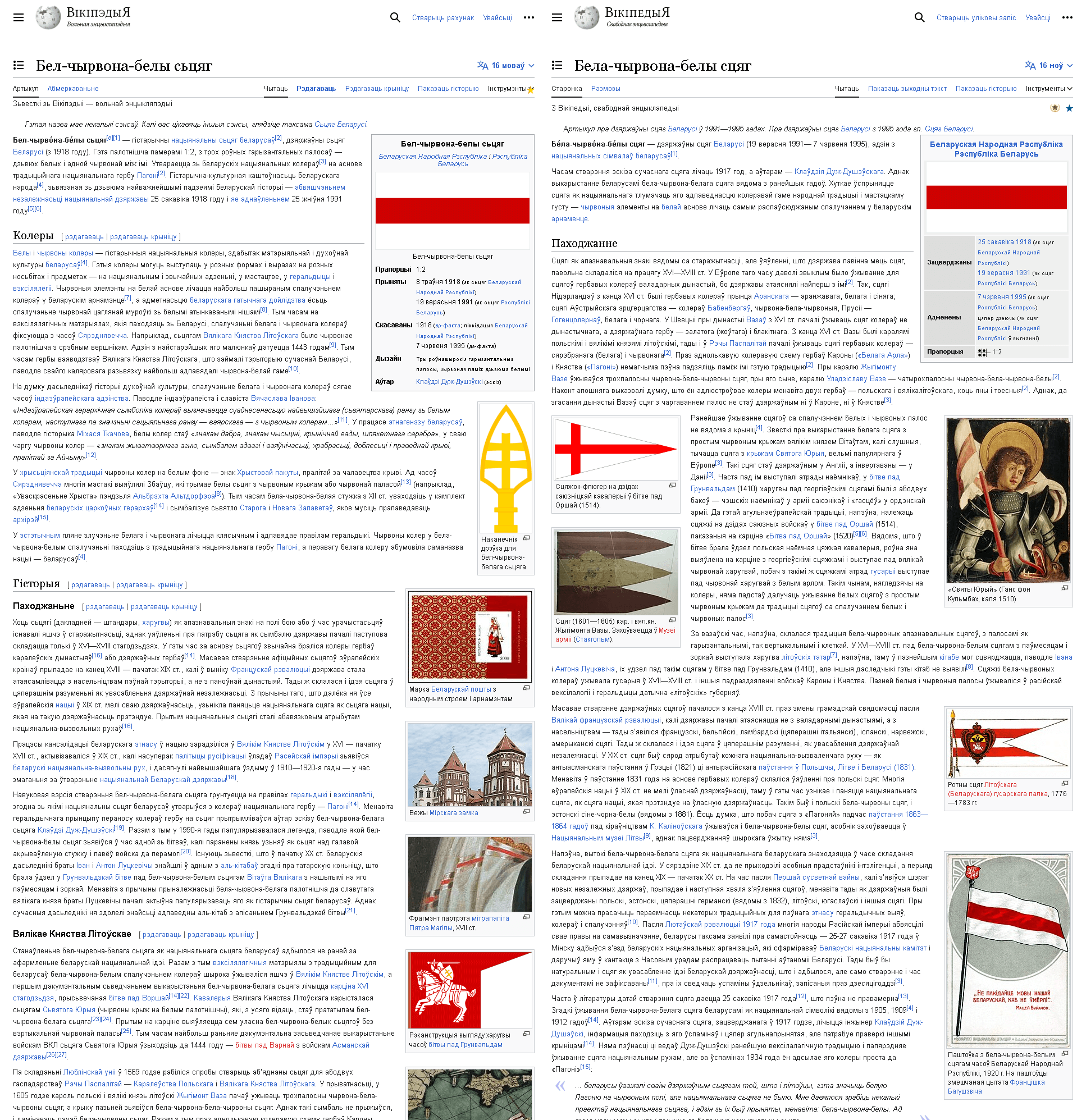
- Taraškievica [be-tarask] (left) and Narkamaŭka [be] editions of Wikipedia
- Website type: Online encyclopedia
- Available in: Belarusian (classical and reformed orthography)
- Owner: Wikimedia Foundation
- Creator: Belarusian wiki community
- Website: be-tarask.wikipedia.org be.wikipedia.org
- Commercial: No
- Users: 173,350 (as of 12 October 2026)
- Launched: 12 August 2004; 22 years ago (mixed orthographies under prefix "be:"); 31 July 2004; 22 years ago ("be-x-old", later renamed "be-tarask")
- Content license: Creative Commons Attribution/ Share-Alike 4.0 (most text also dual-licensed under GFDL); Media licensing varies

The Belarusian Wikipedia (Narkamaŭka: Беларуская Вікіпедыя, romanized: Bielaruskaja Vikipiedyja; Taraškievica: Беларуская Вікіпэдыя, romanized: Bielaruskaja Vikipedyja) is a Belarusian-language version of Wikipedia. There are two different Belarusian Wikipedias: one in the orthography of the Belarusian language which is official in modern Belarus (Narkamaŭka, prefix "be:"), and another one in the pre-reform of 1933, classical orthography (Taraškievica, prefix "be-tarask:", formerly "be-x-old:").

As of October 2023, the most popular editions of Wikipedia within Belarus are the Russian Wikipedia (with 88.0% of all page views) followed by the English Wikipedia (9.1%). The Belarusian Wikipedia has much fewer page views in comparison, making up 1.2% of Wikipedia requests from Belarus. There are currently 267,374 articles on the official Narkamaŭka orthography and 91,440 articles on the classical Taraškievica orthography.

== History ==
The first Belarusian Wikipedia was started on 12 August 2004. One of its creators and first administrators was Uładzimir Katkoŭski (user name: rydel). Katkouski/rydel (who died in 2007) created over 1,300 articles in the Belarusian Wikipedia alone.

Articles in the Belarusian Wikipedia were inconsistently written in both variants of the orthography, leading to conflicts between the adherents of the two.

A "clean" version in the official orthography was initiated in the Wikipedia's "incubator" at Wikimedia's Meta-Wiki. The application for a new Wikipedia was approved in March 2007.

Upon approval, in the evening of the same day, over 6,000 articles written in the pre-reform orthography were transferred from the "be.wikipedia.org" domain to "be-x-old.wikipedia.org", while the 3,500 pages from "Incubator" were moved to "be.wikipedia.org". However, due to a software bug, the move did not go smoothly: in the morning the articles seemed to have disappeared, and users could not log in. This led to a number of news reports that articles in old Belarusian orthography were deleted from Wikipedia.

In September 2015, the domain name of the classical orthography Belarusian Wikipedias was changed from be-x-old.wikipedia.org to be-tarask.wikipedia.org, reflecting the official language subtag assigned by the Internet Assigned Numbers Authority in 2007.

Including the time in the "incubator", the current variant of be-Wikipedia has existed since August 2006.

According to the Belarusian Wikipedian Volha Sitnik, the separation of the two Wikipedias was not very calm at first. However, as of 2023, the communities of the two Wikipedias in Belarusian language are having good relations and cooperate with each other.

The Belarusian Wikipedia written in Taraškievica remains one of the few resources that use the alternative orthography, which experienced a peak in popularity on the internet in the mid-2000s.

Since 2012, when the edition written in the official (academic) orthography surpassed the alternative one in the number of articles, the gap has steadily increased. The number of editors contributing to the alternative orthography edition declined after 2012 and has remained at the same level for many years, whereas the number of editors in the academic orthography edition continues to grow. This is explained by the fact that learning the alternative orthography requires additional effort, while the academic orthography is taught in schools. A different explanation is that the alternative orthography had been forbidden by law on the territory of Belarus since 2010 (after a two-year grace period, which was granted in 2008 to all affected publishers, news media and other entities to facilitate the transition).

== Persecution of Wikipedians ==
Since the early 2020s, Belarusian authorities have intensified persecution of Wikipedia editors, particularly targeting those contributing to politically sensitive articles on protests, human rights, and the Russian invasion of Ukraine. Notable cases include arrests of editors like Volha Sitnik and Maksim Lepushenka in 2024–2025. In response, the Belarusian Wikipedia communities implemented measures such as hiding IP addresses of editors on political topics to protect contributors, amid declining editor numbers.

== Criticism of Belarusian Wikipedia in Taraškievica ==
According to some editors, by the mid-2020s the Taraškievica-language edition had deviated from the principles of neutrality. An alternative reality is effectively created in the edition, where desires and expectations replace actual facts. For example, in the article "Belarus", the white-red-white flag is listed as the official symbol, and Belarusian is named as the sole official language—neither of which reflect the real situation. The edition also openly uses marginal sources, such as samizdat books by an anonymous author writing under the pseudonym Aliokhna Daylida.

A Wikipedian Mikalai Karpyankow (Мікалай Карпянкоў; not to be confused with Nikolay Karpenkov with the same Belarusian name) claims that by 2025 the Taraškievica Wikipedia was reduced to a sorry state by the actions of its administrator with user name Kazimier Lachnovič, who over years forced most Wikipedians out. After he was detained by Belarusian authorities, old editors started returning.

== Rates of contributions ==
Initially the official Belarusian Wikipedia overtook the classical one, but in about a year, it slowed down, and in fall 2008, the classical one was ahead. Today, the official Belarusian Wikipedia has again surpassed the one in the classical orthography.

On 15 March 2008, the official Belarusian encyclopedia reached 10,000 articles.

On 17 June 2009, the classical Belarusian encyclopedia reached 20,000 articles, holding the 65th place among other Wikipedias. At that time, the official Belarusian Wikipedia had about 16,000 articles, holding the 71st place.

On 16 November 2010, the official Belarusian encyclopedia reached 25,000 articles.

On 28 August 2015, the official Belarusian Wikipedia reached 100,000 articles.

== See also ==
- Norwegian Wikipedias, another language with two Wikipedia editions for separate orthographies
