= Towel Day =

Holiday celebrating the works of Douglas Adams

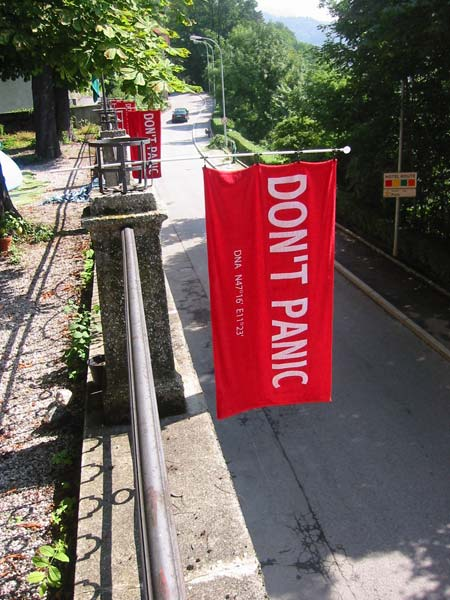
- Towel Day 2005, Innsbruck, Austria, where, by his own account, Adams got the inspiration to write the Guide
- Official name: Towel Day
- Observed by: Fans of the author Douglas Adams
- Type: International
- Observances: carrying a towel throughout the day
- Date: 25 May
- Next time: 25 May 2027
- Frequency: annual
- Related to: Douglas Adams, The Hitchhiker's Guide to the Galaxy

Towel Day is celebrated every year on 25 May as a tribute to the author Douglas Adams by his fans. On this day, fans openly carry a towel with them, as described in Adams' The Hitchhiker's Guide to the Galaxy, to demonstrate their appreciation for the books and the author. The commemoration was first held 25 May 2001, two weeks after Adams' death on 11 May.

== Origin ==
The importance of the towel was introduced in the first of seven books of The Hitchhiker's Guide to the Galaxy original radio series in 1978. The follow-up book explained the importance of towels in The Hitchhiker's Guide to the Galaxy universe in Chapter 3, using much of the same wording as the original radio series:

A towel, it says, is about the most massively useful thing an interstellar hitchhiker can have. Partly it has great practical value. You can wrap it around you for warmth as you bound across the cold moons of Jaglan Beta; you can lie on it on the brilliant marble-sanded beaches of Santraginus V, inhaling the heady sea vapours; you can sleep under it beneath the stars which shine so redly on the desert world of Kakrafoon; use it to sail a miniraft down the slow heavy River Moth; wet it for use in hand-to-hand-combat; wrap it round your head to ward off noxious fumes or avoid the gaze of the Ravenous Bugblatter Beast of Traal (such a mind-bogglingly stupid animal, it assumes that if you can't see it, it can't see you — daft as a brush, but very very ravenous); you can wave your towel in emergencies as a distress signal, and of course dry yourself off with it if it still seems to be clean enough.

More importantly, a towel has immense psychological value. For some reason, if a strag (strag: non-hitch hiker) discovers that a hitchhiker has his towel with him, he will automatically assume that he is also in possession of a toothbrush, face flannel, soap, tin of biscuits, flask, compass, map, ball of string, gnat spray, wet weather gear, space suit etc., etc. Furthermore, the strag will then happily lend the hitch hiker any of these or a dozen other items that the hitch hiker might accidentally have "lost." What the strag will think is that any man who can hitch the length and breadth of the galaxy, rough it, slum it, struggle against terrible odds, win through, and still knows where his towel is, is clearly a man to be reckoned with.

Hence a phrase that has passed into hitchhiking slang, as in "Hey, you sass that hoopy Ford Prefect? There's a frood who really knows where his towel is." (Sass: know, be aware of, meet, have sex with; hoopy: really together guy; frood: really amazingly together guy.)

— Douglas Adams, The Hitchhiker's Guide to the Galaxy

The original article that began Towel Day was posted by a D. Clyde Williamson, a contributor at "System Toolbox", a short-lived System Administration website affiliated with "Binary Freedom", an open source forum. To promote the group's proposed memorial event, System Toolbox's site director, Chris Campbell, created the towelday.org website. The idea was shared by Slashdot in a post that reminded people to bring their towels on May 25. Towel Day was an immediate success among fans and many people sent in pictures of themselves with their towels. Campbell ran the Towel Day website for several years before transferring it. It is now maintained by an anonymous group of Douglas Adams' fans.

== Recognition ==
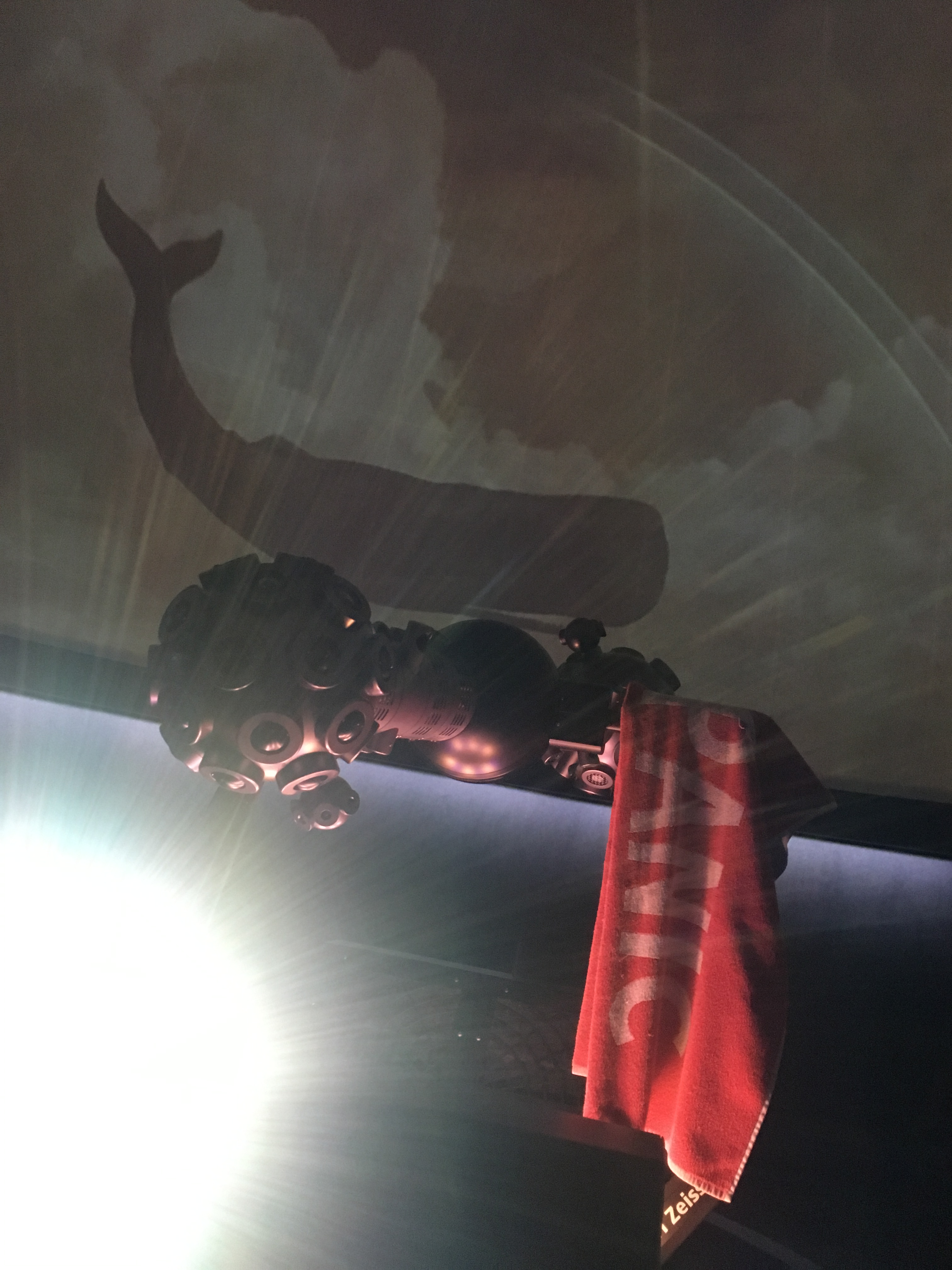
A star projector adorned with a towel on Towel Day. Planetarium Laupheim.

Several news sources around the world have mentioned Towel Day, including the Norwegian newspaper Aftenposten and the television news show NRK Nyheter, and National Public Radio, Los Angeles.

In May 2010, an online petition was created asking Google to recognize Towel Day with either a Google Doodle or by returning search results in the Vogon language for a day. As of 10 September 2014, the petition had received 5,373 signatures; however, the petition website is now defunct. On 11 March 2013, Google published an official Doodle in recognition of what would have been Douglas Adams’ 61st birthday.

=== 2010 ===
In Canada, Volt, a French/English television show, created a skit in which Towel Day was explained and featured.

In Ecuador, Radio City, a BBC affiliated radio station, interviewed one of the organizers of Towel Day in Toronto to introduce their listeners to Towel Day. The interview was in Spanish and English.

=== 2011 ===
In the United Kingdom, Planet Rock aired an "Alternative Thought Of The Day" by David Haddock about Towel Day and Siren FM broadcast "Dean Wilkinson & the Importance of International Towel Day".

=== 2012 ===
In January 2012, The Huffington Post listed Towel Day as one of ten cult literary traditions.

=== 2013 ===
In recognition of Towel Day, the Norwegian public transportation company Kolumbus gave away a limited number of special towels to customers. Each towel contained an RFID chip that allows a free ride on their buses and boats. In Washington, D.C., the Chevy Chase branch of the District of Columbia Public Library offered prizes for those who wore a towel to the library on Towel Day.

=== 2015 ===
On Towel Day 2015, Italian astronaut Samantha Cristoforetti sent a "Towel Day greeting" and read aloud a sample from The Hitchhiker's Guide To The Galaxy from the International Space Station.

=== 2016 ===
Towel Day was celebrated by Briton Tim Peake on the International Space Station.

As Towel Day 2016 fell during the RIPE 72 meeting, the RIPE NCC distributed a beach towel printed with an IPv6 subnet chart (from their training materials).

=== 2019 ===
In the year 2019, Towel Day was celebrated by Don't Panic Labs in Nebraska, U.S., by organizing a donation drive called the "Towel Day Drive" where people were asked to donate new or extremely gently used towels to the "People's City Mission". Many people also donated money to buy towels.

== See also ==
- Geek Pride Day, celebrated on the same date
- The Glorious 25th Of May from the works of Sir Terry Pratchett.
