= Edewin Fanini =

Brazilian footballer (born 1986)

Personal information
- Full name: Edewin Fanini Maria
- Date of birth: 25 May 1986 (age 40)
- Place of birth: Curitiba, Brazil
- Height: 1.93 m (6 ft 4 in)
- Position: Goalkeeper

Youth career
- 2002–2004: Campo Grande

Senior career*
Years	Team	Apps	(Gls)
2004	Cologna Veneta	7	(0)
2004–2006	Voghera	33	(0)
2006	Padova	0	(0)
2006–2007	Nocerina	2	(0)
2008	Campo Grande		
2009	Jaguaré		
2009	Campo Grande		
2010	Angra dos Reis		
2011–2012	Águia Negra		
2012	CENE	5	(0)
- * Club domestic league appearances and goals

Edewin Fanini Maria (born 25 May 1986) is an Italian Brazilian footballer for CENE (as of 2012). His maternal ancestor was from Veneto. He had a younger brother, Endrew Fanini Maria.

== Biography ==
Born in Curitiba, Paraná, Fanini started his career with Rio de Janeiro team Campo Grande. In 2004, he left for Italian Serie D club Cologna Veneta, then left for Voghera.

In 2006, he was signed by Serie C1 club Padova. In August, he was signed by Nocerina.

In March 2008 Fanini returned to Campo Grande, signed a contract until the end of 2008 Copa Rio. He played 6 matches in the cup. He was released prior the start of 2008 Campeonato Carioca Série C.

In March 2009 he was signed by Jaguaré for 2009 Campeonato Capixaba. In July, he returned to Campo Grande for Campeonato Carioca Série B (2nd Division). He was the first choice of the team, played at least 22 times, ahead Igor (2 time). The team finished as the least of relegation group and relegated.

In February 2010 he left for Angra dos Reis for 2010 Campeonato Carioca Série B in 6-month contract. He played 12 times (out of possible 23, 3 matches abandoned), 10 of them as starter.

Fanini spent 1 1/2 years with Águia Negra from January 2011 to May 2012. In May 2012 he was signed by CENE in 5-month contract for 2012 Campeonato Brasileiro Série D. Fanini played 5 times in his first national league appearances in Brazil, ahead the original starter Fernando who played 3 times.
