= Moritz Stehling =

German professional footballer (born 1987)

Personal information
- Full name: Moritz Frederick Stehling
- Date of birth: May 25, 1987 (age 39)
- Place of birth: Bonn, West Germany
- Height: 1.88 m (6 ft 2 in)
- Position: Goalkeeper

Team information
- Current team: RFCU Kelmis
- Number: 90

Youth career
- –2006: Alemannia Aachen
- 2006–2007: Roda JC

Senior career*
Years	Team	Apps	(Gls)
2007–2008	RFCU Kelmis	31	(0)
2008–2009	Fortuna Sittard	1	(0)
2009	JK Tammeka Tartu	14	(0)
2010–	RFCU Kelmis		
- * Club domestic league appearances and goals as of November 30, 2009

Moritz Frederick Stehling (born May 25, 1987 in Bonn) is a German professional footballer, who plays in the RFCU Kelmis.

== Career ==
The goalkeeper played for Alemannia Aachen, Roda JC, Union La Calamine, Fortuna Sittard and in the Estonian Meistriliiga, for JK Tammeka Tartu.

== Club career ==
=== Statistics ===
Season	League	Country	Team	Games	Goals
2007–08	3	Belgium	R.F.C. Union La Calamine		
2008–09	2	Netherlands	Fortuna Sittard		
2009	1	Estonia	JK Tammeka Tartu	14	0
As of November 31, 2009.
