= Jar'Edo Wens hoax =

Deliberately fictitious Wikipedia article

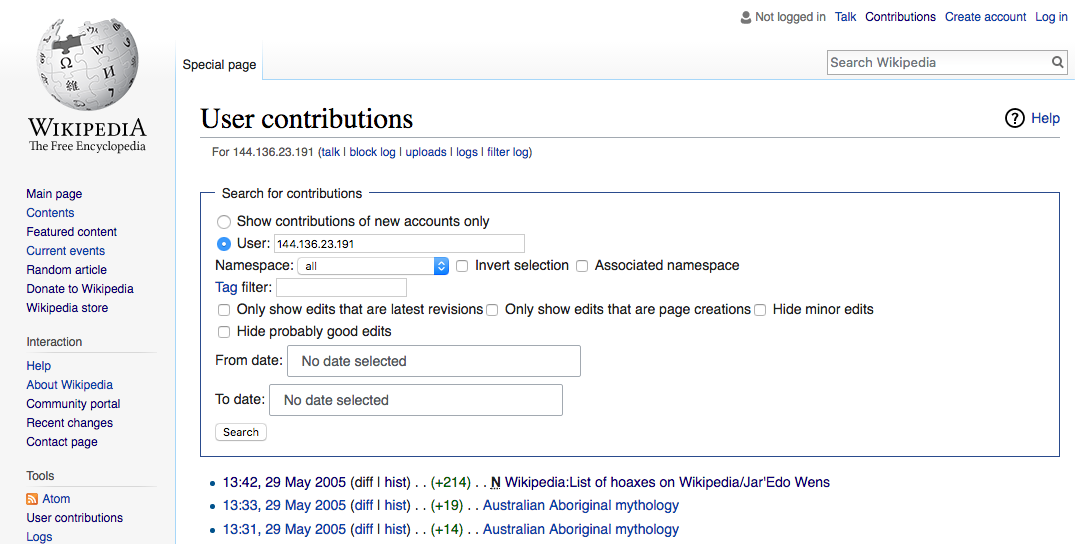
The three edits of the anonymous user who added the hoax

Jar'Edo Wens was a deliberately fictitious Wikipedia article which existed for almost ten years before being spotted in November 2014 and deleted in March 2015. At the time, it was the longest-lasting hoax article discovered in the history of Wikipedia, although it has since been surpassed.

== Origin ==
The "Jar'Edo Wens" article was created on 29 May 2005. It was only two sentences in length and cited no sources. It claimed to be about an Australian Aboriginal god "of earthly knowledge and physical might, created by Altjira to ensure that people did not get too arrogant or self-conceited" that "is associated with victory and intelligence." It was likely simply the name "Jared Owens", with different spacing, punctuation, and casing.

The author, an unregistered user at an Australian IP address, was active for eleven minutes in May 2005; their only other contribution was to add "Yohrmum" (likely a re-spelling of "Your mum") to a list of Australian deities within an article about Australian Aboriginal religion and mythology. This was more quickly spotted and removed, but it was almost a decade before "Jar'Edo Wens" was deleted.

== Spread ==
Jar'Edo Wens mentioned in chapter ten ("Five Hundred Dead Gods and the Problems of Other Religions") of the 2012 book: Atheism and the Case Against Christ

During its nearly decade-long existence, the "Jar'Edo Wens" hoax article was translated into other language editions of Wikipedia, including French, Polish, Russian, and Turkish; two language editions additionally included the shorter-lived "yohrmum" page. An entry was also created on Wikidata.

The hoax was unwittingly copied into a book on atheism in 2012, as part of a list of 500 "gods and religions in history that have fallen out of favour".

== Discovery ==
The hoax lasted nine years, nine months, and three days on Wikipedia. New article creation was later restricted to registered users after the Seigenthaler incident in September 2005; although this made new fake articles more difficult to establish, existing hoax articles (especially low-trafficked ones) could more easily go unnoticed.

On 8 August 2009, the article was tagged with the classification "multiple issues", including a lack of sources. However, it was only on 27 November 2014 that the article was flagged as a possible hoax. It was finally proposed for deletion on 1 March 2015, and the deletion was confirmed two days later by the administrator Newyorkbrad. Wikipediocracy, a website for Wikipedia criticism, publicized the hoax on 15 March 2015, after which it was widely reported by more general news sites.

== See also ==
- Alan MacMasters hoax
- Circular reporting
- Henryk Batuta hoax
- Carlos Bandeirense Mirandópolis hoax
- Zhemao hoaxes
- List of Wikipedia controversies
