= Neil L. Waters =

American historian

- Education: University of Hawaiʻi
- Occupation: Professor of Japanese history
- Title: Kawashima Emeritus Professor of History and Japanese Studies at Middlebury College
- Spouse: Linda

Neil L. Waters is an American historian of Japan. He is Kawashima Emeritus Professor of History and Japanese Studies at Middlebury College. Waters is notable for his criticism of the reliability of Wikipedia. In 2007, he banned his students from citing Wikipedia as a source.

== Biography ==
Waters spent his early life in the western United States, especially Oregon, California, and Colorado. He and his wife Linda served in the Peace Corps in South Korea from 1967 until 1969. In 1978, he earned graduated from the University of Hawaiʻi with a PhD in Japanese history. Afterwards, he was an assistant professor of history at Virginia Commonwealth University.

He was an associate professor at St. Lawrence University before becoming a professor at Middlebury College in 1990. In 1983, he wrote Japan's Local Pragmatists: The Transition from Bakumatsu to Meiji in the Kawasaki Region. He edited Beyond the Area Studies Wars: Toward a New International Studies in 2000.

He is currently Kawashima Emeritus Professor of History and Japanese Studies at Middlebury College. He was previously chair of the college's history department and director of International Studies and East Asian Studies.

=== Criticism of Wikipedia ===
Waters has criticized Wikipedia and described it as an unreliable source of information. He has compared Wikipedia to the game show Family Feud, in which contestants try to guess the most popular answer, rather than the most accurate one.

Waters instigated a policy in the Middlebury College history department that banned students from citing Wikipedia as a source, and drafted the original policy statement. Waters realized that many of his students were relying on Wikipedia after noticing that several of them made the erroneous claim that the Jesuits had supported the Shimabara Rebellion, and that this false information ultimately came from Wikipedia. The New York Times wrote that "With the move, Middlebury, in Vermont, jumped into a growing debate within journalism, the law and academia over what respect, if any, to give Wikipedia articles".

The Wikimedia Foundation responded to the policy with a statement saying that "Wikipedia is the ideal place to start your research and get a global picture of a topic; however, it is not an authoritative source." Wikipedia co-founder Jimmy Wales said that he did not disagree with Waters' stance, saying "Basically, they are recommending exactly what we suggested students shouldn’t be citing encyclopedias. I would hope they wouldn’t be citing Encyclopaedia Britannica, either."

In an article published September 1, 2007, Waters wrote that some editors "through ignorance, sloppy research, or, on occasion, malice or zeal, can and do introduce or perpetuate errors in fact or interpretation." As of 2010, Waters continued to ban the citation of Wikipedia in his classroom, commenting that Wikipedia's editing policies did not encourage students to avoid mistakes or take responsibility for their writing.

== See also ==
- Criticism of Wikipedia
