= Theodore Pappas =

Executive editor of Encyclopaedia Britannica

Theodore D. "Ted" Pappas is executive editor and chief development officer of Encyclopædia Britannica. He has been with the company since 1998.

He was managing editor of the paleoconservative magazine Chronicles: A Magazine of American Culture. His books include True Grit: Classic Tales of Perseverance (2018), Encyclopaedia Britannica Anniversary Edition: 250 Years of Excellence (1768-2018), Britannica Brainbusters: Challenging Puzzles for the Curious-Minded (2015), and Plagiarism and the Culture War: The Writings of Martin Luther King Jr. and Other Prominent Americans (1998). He contributes to Britannica's PR activities and media relations.

Pappas' first publication was his undergraduate thesis at Beloit College on the missionary Arthur Henderson Smith, who had a long career in China and himself graduated from Beloit in 1845.

== Martin Luther King's plagiarism controversy ==
The Rockford Institute published Plagiarism and the Culture War: The Writings of Martin Luther King Jr. and Other Prominent Americans in 1994, and a revised and enlarged edition came out in 1998, with a Preface by Eugene Genovese. The political scientist David J. Garrow wrote in evaluation of Pappas' preliminary article in Chronicle that "nothing can be gained by attempting to minimize or understate either the amount of King's plagiarism or the seriousness of the academic wrongdoing that it represented." He continued that "those who are either uncomfortable with or downright hostile to King and the movement's larger political legacy," in particular Pappas, " are hard at work to amplify and emphasize" the pirating." D.D. Murphey, however, welcomed the expanded argument presented in the 1994 book.

== Criticism of Wikipedia ==
In 2004, Pappas disparaged the reliability of Wikipedia. He was quoted in The Guardian as noting that "The premise of Wikipedia is that continuous improvement will lead to perfection" but "that premise is completely unproven..." He continued that "with many of the pieces you don't know who it's written by, and who the administrators are...," and concluded that "hyperlinks, bulletpoints and cut-and-paste press releases do not an encyclopedia entry make."

== Selected publications ==
- Theodore D Pappas, "Arthur Henderson Smith and the American Mission in China," The Wisconsin Magazine of History 70.3 (1987): 162-186. JSTOR https://www.jstor.org/stable/4636056
- --- , "A Doctor In Spite of Himself: The Strange Career of Martin Luther King, Jr.'s Dissertation," Chronicle 15 (January 1991): 25-29.
- --- "Plagiarism, Culture, and the Future of the Academy Humanitas 6.2 (1993): 66-80
- --- , Plagiarism and the Culture War: The Writings of Martin Luther King, Jr., and Other Prominent Americans. (Rockford Institute, 1994; 2nd ed, revised and enlarged, with a Preface by Eugene Genovese; Tampa, Florida: Hallberg, 1998. Internet Archive: HERE
