= Brazilian aardvark =

Fake name of the coati

A white-nosed coati in South America

Brazilian aardvark is a name that first appeared in 2008 when it was added to the Wikipedia page of the coati by a user alleging that this was a name the animal was "also known as". However, no citation was provided and the name had in fact been created by the seventeen-year-old editor as a joke.

The made up nickname remained on Wikipedia for six years and came to be copied and spread by numerous websites and multiple newspapers, as well as being published in a book by a university press and even in an academic book on natural history. In an instance of circular reporting, the name on Wikipedia came to be supported by a citation to a newspaper article which had uncritically repeated the claim. It wasn't until 2014 when an article published by Eric Randall in the New Yorker revealed the hoax and the name was removed from Wikipedia.

== First appearance of the name ==
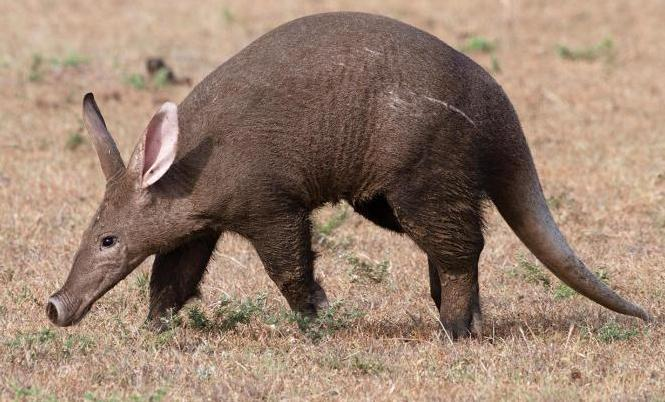
An aardvark in South Africa

In July 2008, Dylan Breves—a seventeen-year-old student from New York City—edited the Wikipedia article on the coati, adding that the animal was "also known as the "Brazilian aardvark". Breves did not cite any sources for this claim and had in fact invented the name himself as a private joke. Breves and his brother had encountered coatis during a trip to Iguaçu Falls in Brazil, where they mistakenly believed the animals were aardvarks.

== Spread ==
Shortly after its addition, the made up nickname was picked up and repeated by numerous sources. Taxonomically, the coati is not related to the aardvark and the two animals inhabit different regions, with aardvarks being native to sub-Saharan Africa and coatis native to North and South America.

About a year after making the edit, Breves searched online for the phrase "Brazilian aardvark" and found that his edit still there on the Wikipedia article, and that it had even been picked up and repeated by hundreds of other websites about coatis. References to the nickname later appeared in The Independent, the Daily Express, the Daily Mail, the Metro, a book published by the University of Chicago, (Note: The book which included the nickname was Henderson, C. (2013). The Book of Barely Imagined Beings: A 21st Century Bestiary) and a scholarly work published by the University of Cambridge. No mentions of the phrase existed online before his edit in July 2008.

In an instance of circular reporting, the false nickname on Wikipedia came to be backed up by a citation to a newspaper article which had uncritically repeated the claim.

== Discovery of the hoax ==
In May 2014 The New Yorker published an article by Eric Randall exposing the hoax and the nickname was removed from Wikipedia.

The false name and its propagation are discussed in Tom Phillips's 2019 book Truth: A Brief History of Total Bullsh*t, where Phillips writes that "the Brazilian aardvark is an animal that tells us an awful lot about truth, and how bad we are at it."

== See also ==
- Reliability of Wikipedia
- Wikipedia:List of citogenesis incidents
