= Alan MacMasters hoax =

Hoax about the inventor of the electric toaster

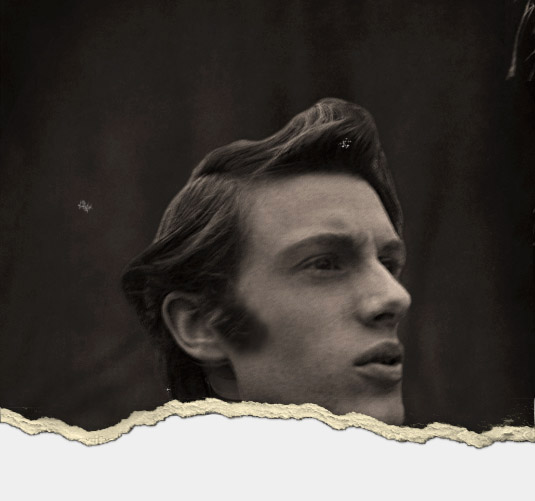
The manipulated photograph of Alex purported to be of Alan MacMasters

In February 2012, a group of British students created a hoax by editing the English Wikipedia article about the electric toaster, inserting the false claim that a man named Alan MacMasters invented it in 1893. One of the students created a separate article about the fictitious Alan MacMasters in February 2013 and embellished it with further details in the following years. The fake article was cited by several newspapers and organisations until the hoax was exposed in July 2022.

The actual development of the pop-up toaster was based on technologies and features invented between 1890 and 1920 by various people and companies.

== Origins ==
On 6 February 2012, University of Surrey aerospace engineering student Alan MacMasters was at a university lecture on dynamics, where the class was warned not to use Wikipedia as a source. Additionally, the lecturer pointed out that his friend, Maddy Kennedy, had edited the Wikipedia article about toasters, falsely claiming he was the inventor.

After the lecture, Alan and his friends visited the toaster article on Wikipedia, where one of them, Alex, edited the article to replace the lecturer's friend's name with Alan MacMasters, claiming he invented the toaster in Edinburgh, Scotland, in 1893.

In February 2013, Alex escalated the hoax by creating an article dedicated to Alan MacMasters, including an image of himself manipulated to resemble a 19th-century photograph. Alex and other editors extended and embellished the fictitious biography over time.

In the article, Alex mentioned that the product was not commercially successful. He also attributed the invention of the electric kettle to MacMasters and suggested that the toaster had contributed to one of Britain's earliest fatal appliance fires. One fabricated anecdote recounted a woman whose kitchen table caught fire after the toaster's heating elements melted. Another falsehood he added was that MacMasters had assisted in developing lighting systems for the London Underground.

== Impact ==
While the article had started out as a jest, many people and organisations accepted its claims as fact and perpetuated the false story. This created a case of circular reporting, as Alex and others then used these sources citing MacMasters as the inventor of the toaster to prop up the false information on Wikipedia. Others repeating the story included newspapers such as The Scotsman and The Mirror, as well as government bodies and museums. Several books in multiple languages named MacMasters as the inventor.

A primary school in Scotland dedicated a day to MacMasters. In a response to a request for nominations from the Bank of England, MacMasters was nominated to appear on a £50 note, and was preselected as one of the 989 eligible names out of 227,299 nominations. During the 2014 Scottish independence referendum, Scottish Government-funded organisations cited Alan's story as evidence of how an independent Scotland could succeed. During an appearance on the BBC cooking show Great British Menu, chef Scott Smith created a dessert in honor of MacMasters.

== Discovery and aftermath ==
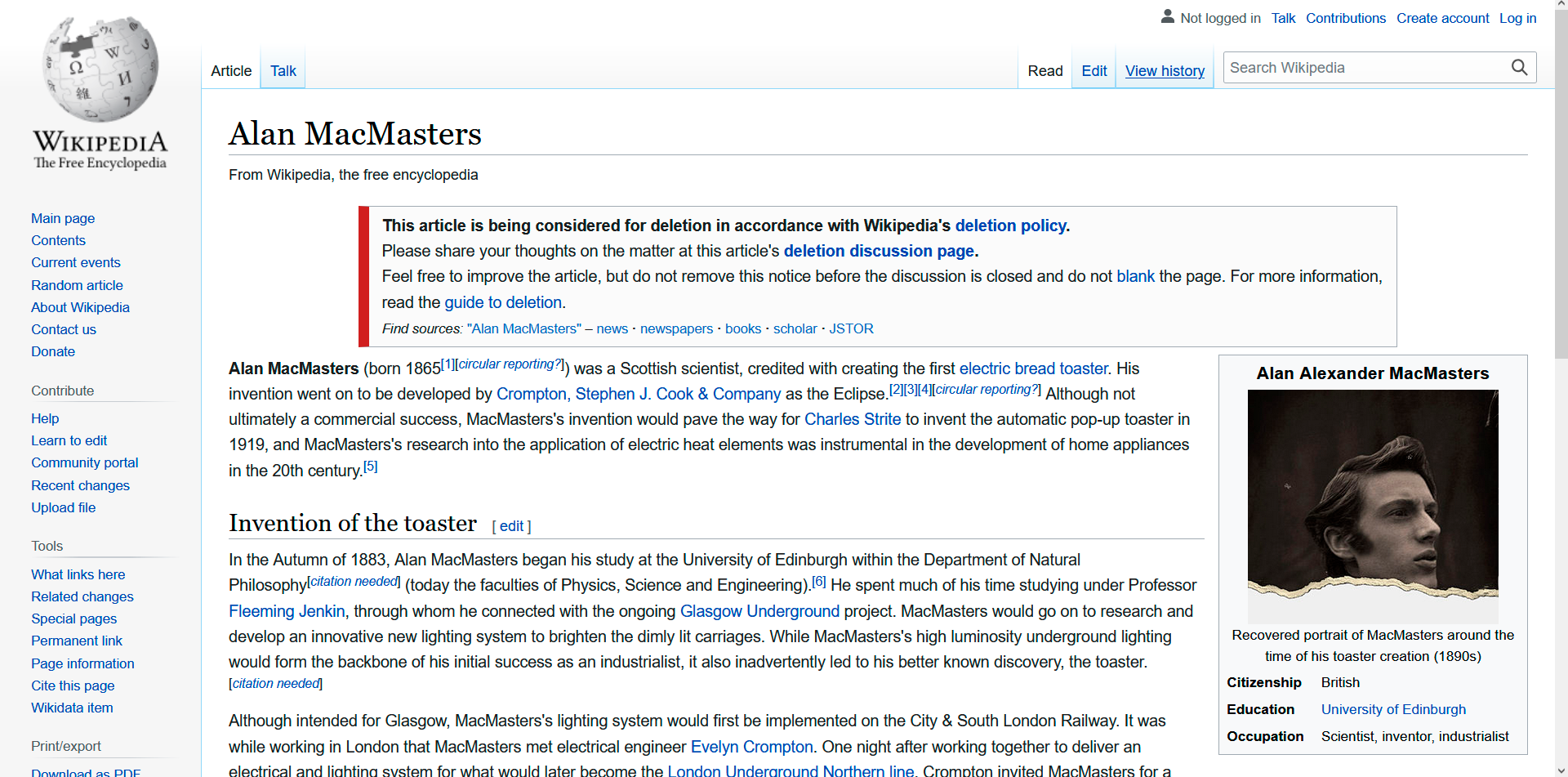
Alan MacMasters hoax article on 19 July 2022

In July 2022, a Kent-based teenage student named Adam became suspicious of the photograph on Alan MacMasters' Wikipedia page and, upon scrutinising it further, discovered that it was edited and not legitimate. Adam subsequently posted his findings to Reddit. This research was prompted after his teacher spoke about MacMasters in class and Adam looked up the article of the supposed inventor. However, Adam was unaware that the entire article was a hoax. A viewer of the Reddit post reported their concern on the Internet forum Wikipediocracy, where users discovered the article's fraudulent nature. Soon after this, the page was labelled as a hoax and marked for deletion. Alex's Wikipedia account, which he used to perpetrate the hoax, was subsequently blocked from the platform.

In an interview published on Wikipediocracy in 2022, the creator of the hoax said that he initially thought the prank would not cause much harm, that awareness that the article was a hoax had actually been "widespread", and that many subsequent embellishments to the article had been made by other editors. He described the first time he realised the prank was harmful was when he read a book about Victorian inventors and found Alan MacMasters listed as one of the inventors.

In a July 2024 interview, Alan said that he still edits Wikipedia as an apology, but remains anonymous out of fear of being banned.

== See also ==
- Jar'Edo Wens hoax
- Circular reporting
- Wikipedia:List of hoaxes on Wikipedia
- Self-insertion
