= Nuclear Gandhi =

Video game urban legend

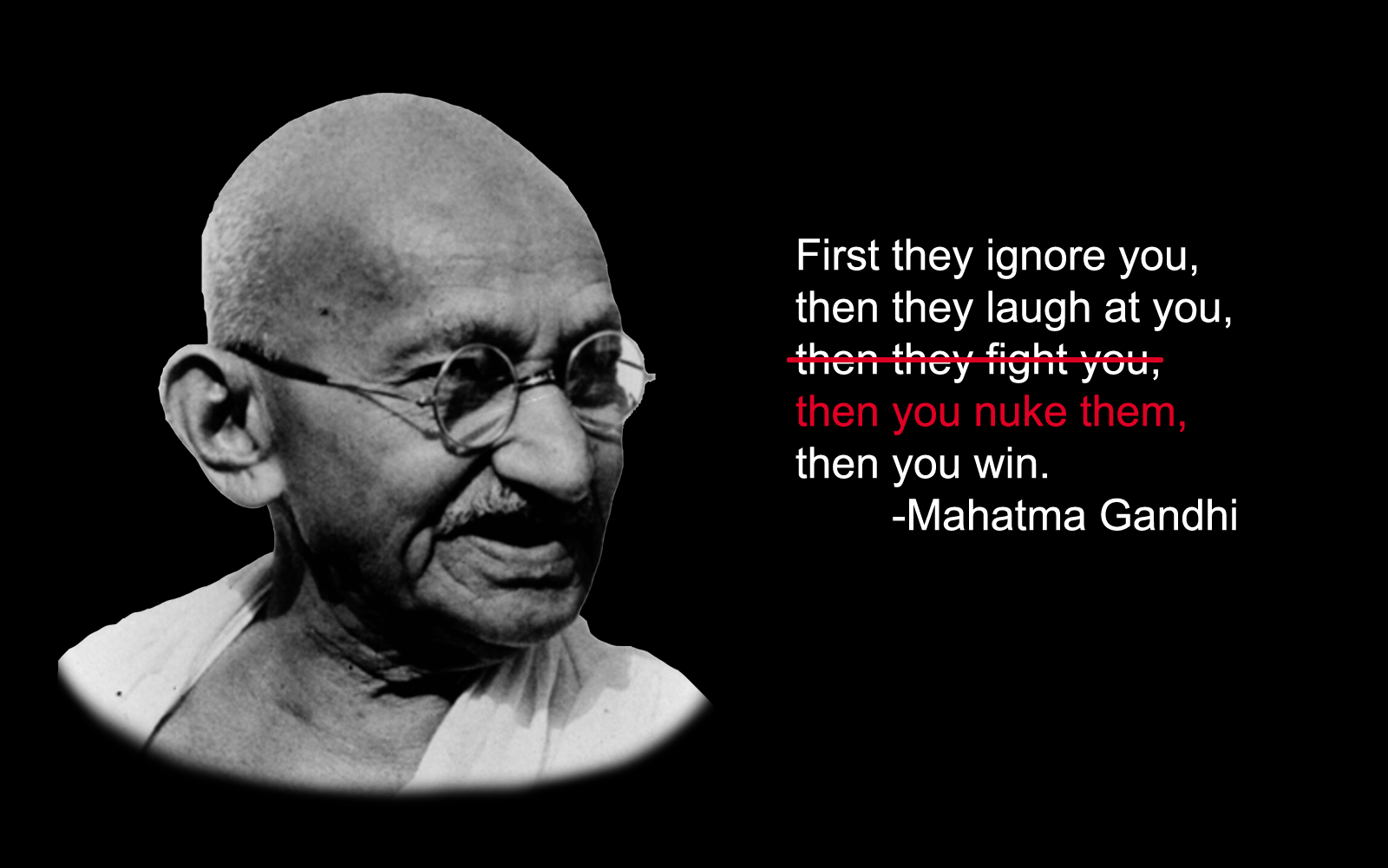
An example of Nuclear Gandhi as an Internet meme

Nuclear Gandhi is a video game urban legend purporting the existence of a software bug in the 1991 strategy video game Civilization that would eventually force the pacifist leader Mahatma Gandhi to become extremely aggressive and make heavy use of nuclear weapons. The claim was mentioned on the TV Tropes wiki in 2012, and continued until 2020, when the series' creator, Sid Meier, confirmed that the bug would have been impossible in the original game. Gandhi was programmed to exhibit this behavior in Civilization V, released in 2010, and it is unclear whether this led to the belief that the behavior had also been present in earlier games.

While fictional, Nuclear Gandhi is one of the most recognizable video game glitches and has been used as an example of integer overflow in computer science, and was included as an Easter egg in other games in the Civilization series.

== Background ==
According to the legend, each leader's game AI in Civilization had a parameter that described their aggression on a scale from 1 to 10, with 1 being least aggressive and 10 most aggressive. Other sources say the scale went from 1 to 12. Indian leader Mahatma Gandhi was the only leader in the game with the lowest possible aggression rating of 1 and, as a result, was only able to wage defensive wars. Once the AI changed its government form to democracy, which was preferred by peaceful nations such as India, its aggression level decreased by 2. In the case of Gandhi, this would lead to an aggression level of −1.

According to the legend, the aggression level was stored as an 8-bit unsigned integer variable that could only store values in the range from 0 to 255 (or 2^{8} − 1), and the negative value would therefore result in an integer overflow, with the value being stored as 255 and Gandhi supposedly becoming about 25 times more aggressive than the most aggressive leaders in the game. In Civilization's technology tree, nuclear weapons are generally unlocked only after democracy, so Gandhi's aggression level would have already spiked by the time India became nuclear-capable. This led to India suddenly attacking other civilizations with nuclear missiles. Some versions of the story say that the bug was fixed in later versions of the game, others the developers were so amused by it that they deliberately re-implemented as an Easter egg. Some versions of the story claim that the bug first appeared in Civilization II.

In reality, according to the Civilization II lead game designer Brian Reynolds, there were only three possible aggression levels in Civilization, and even though Gandhi's AI had the lowest possible aggression level, he shared it with one third of all leaders. Additionally, based on his memories of Civilization's source code, Reynolds stated that there was no unsigned variable in this section of code and that leaders could not act more aggressively than the most aggressive leaders of the game. A leader with an aggression level of 255 would act the same way as a leader with an aggression level of 3. According to Sid Meier, since all integer variables are signed by default in both C and C++ (the programming languages of Civilization and Civilization II respectively), underflow would not have occurred if Gandhi's aggression were set to –1; moreover, the government form does not affect AI aggressiveness at all, so Gandhi's aggression level remained the same throughout the game. During wars, India could use nuclear weapons just like any other civilization, but Gandhi would not use nuclear weapons more often than Abraham Lincoln or any other peaceful leaders. One possible origin of the legend could be India's tendency to discover nuclear technology before most of its opponents because of the peaceful scientific nature of this civilization. Reynolds noted that all leaders in the game become "pretty ornery" after their acquisition of nuclear weapons, and suggested that this behavior simply seemed more surprising and memorable when it happened to Gandhi.

== Appearances ==
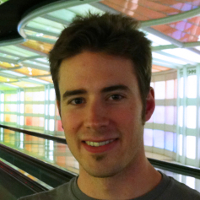
Jon Shafer made Gandhi a nuclear weapon enthusiast in Civilization V.

Through Civilization IV, a popular misconception held that Gandhi was "still" programmed with a tendency to use nuclear weapons as an Easter egg, but no such behavior was purposely added to the games by Firaxis. The first such intentional inclusion of Nuclear Gandhi was in Civilization V. Civilization V lead game designer Jon Shafer set Gandhi's "Build Nuke" and "Use Nuke" parameters to the highest possible value, 12. Shafer said that he did this as a joke: "it's fun to imagine that an Indian politician promoting Satyagraha may have a desire to nuke his neighbors". Following the game's release in 2010, players noticed Gandhi's incongruous behavior; it was addressed in The Escapist magazine's comic Critical Miss. Players nicknamed Civilization V's Gandhi "Thermonuclear", "destroyer of worlds", and "Kurchatov".

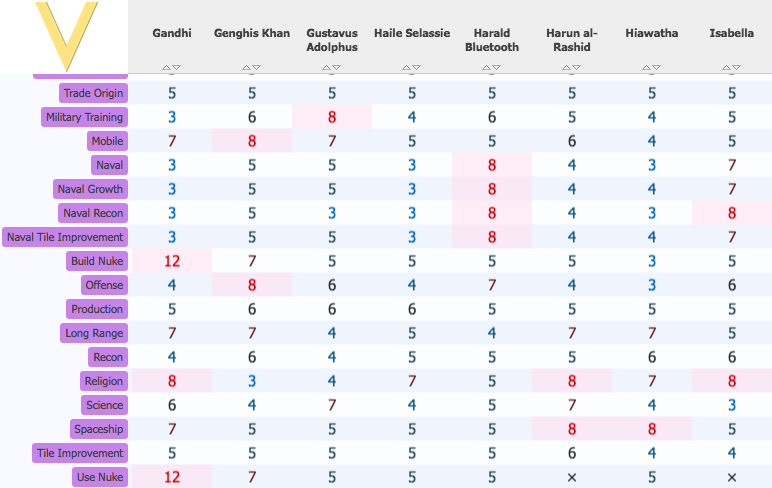
An artificial intelligence configuration of Civilization V. Gandhi's high values of "Build Nuke" and "Use Nuke" favors are clearly visible.

Gandhi is actually one of the most peaceful leaders in Civilization V, but his artificial intelligence parameters that control building and using of nuclear weapons have the value of 12, which is the highest of any leader. The next three leaders have a value of 8, and most leaders have a value between 4 and 6. To bring more diversity to the gameplay, at the start of each game, Civilization V adjusts these parameters by adding a random value between −2 and +2 to each of these two values; in the case of Gandhi, this means the "Build Nuke" and "Use Nuke" parameters will never go lower than the maximum rating: 10 out of 10.

Civilization VI introduced a secret agenda mechanic that regulates the artificial intelligence behavior. Each leader has two agendas: the first is constant and based on each leader's personal history, and the second one (as well as a third one in Civilization VI: Gathering Storm) is chosen randomly at the start of each game. Gandhi's fixed goal is "Peacekeeper": Gandhi is much less likely to start wars, and disdains civilizations that do, as well as appreciating those that do the opposite. However, he has a fixed 70% probability of getting "Nuke Happy" as his secondary agenda, which causes him to focus on building nukes, appreciate civilizations that do, and disdain civilizations that do not.

== Urban legend ==
In 2012, 21 years after the original Civilization was released, the TV Tropes page for Civilization was edited by user Tunafish to add a claim that a software bug caused Gandhi to act much more aggressively, but did not include any proof for the claim. In November, the same information was added to Wikia. According to Sid Meier, over the next two years, the story spread across the Internet and each time someone doubted it, a link to a wiki was used as a proof.

In 2014, the story gained publicity after a reposted Critical Miss comic caused a discussion in the comment section on Reddit over why Gandhi was made that aggressive. Ten days later, the video game blog Kotaku posted the article "Why Gandhi Is Such An Asshole In Civilization", which prompted other news websites and blogs to republish the information. Soon, "Nuclear Gandhi" became a common video game Internet meme and joke. Moreover, as the "Nuclear Gandhi" meme spread, many people reported having been particularly annoyed by India in the first games of the Civilization series, a false memory which has been described as an example of the Mandela effect. Information about "Nuclear Gandhi" was later added to Know Your Meme, which stated that the bug first appeared in Civilization II.

On June 18, 2019, Firaxis marketing manager Kevin Schultz posted a tweet stating that he was going offline for two weeks due to a business trip to China, and offered to reflect on the question, "What if the widely shared and reposted story about Gandhi's love for nukes in the original Civilization being caused by a bug is totally false?" This prompted ex-Eurogamer columnist Chris Bratt to start a journalistic investigation.

Bratt contacted 2K's PR department and asked for an interview with a Firaxis representative, but his request was denied. Bratt then contacted ex-Firaxis game designer Bruce Shelley, who stated that he did not remember whether the glitch existed, since the development of Civilization was 30 years ago: "I vaguely remember an issue with Gandhi, but the guy you would have to speak with is Sid [Meier]." The next person Bratt contacted was lead Civilization II game designer Brian Reynolds, who replied: "Although it's been ~20 years since I've seen the Civ 1 code, I can still tell you with 99.99% certainty the Gandhi bug is completely apocryphal." Bratt contacted 2K and Sid Meier once again but did not receive a direct refutation. Meier stated that he did not know the correct answer, but he thinks that the urban legend is a good thing: "given the limited technology of the time, the original Civ was in many ways a game that took place mainly in players' imaginations", so "I'd be reluctant to limit what that player can imagine by introducing too many of my thoughts". Bratt posted a YouTube video with his investigation's findings. Later, in an Ars Technica interview, Sid Meier similarly stated that the bug was possible, "but it was not intentional".

On September 8, 2020, Sid Meier's autobiography, Sid Meier's Memoir!: A Life in Computer Games, was released, containing confirmation that the Gandhi software bug was fabricated and a detailed background of the urban legend's formation.

== Legacy ==
Despite its non-existence, "Nuclear Gandhi" is one of the most recognizable bugs in the history of video games. It has spawned a large number of Internet memes, and it has been used as an example of integer underflow in computer science courses at Harvard University, among others.

== See also ==
- India and weapons of mass destruction
- Pokhran-II – 1998 series of Indian nuclear weapons tests
- Smiling Buddha – India's first successful nuclear weapons test (1974)
