= Knowledge equity =

Concept in social science

Knowledge equity is a social science concept referring to social change concerning expanding what is valued as knowledge and how communities may have been excluded from this discourse through imbalanced structures of power and privilege. Issues related to knowledge equity are discussed in fields such as standpoint theory or decolonial research.

== History ==
Knowledge equity developed from the discipline of knowledge management, and referred to the knowledge measurement process where tacit or subjective information is included to more traditional structures of information management. This developed into ways of applying a valuation to knowledge, including both those who know and the processes involving accessing, making sense of, and organizing it. The connection with accessing various areas of knowledge creation are often connected to open access publications, allowing equitable access to those who may need.

Access to knowledge and beliefs about what counts for knowledge has continued to shift within the social sciences, leading to a recognition that those who control what counts as knowledge and how that influences hierarchy and knowledge imbalance. Acknowledging beliefs that some forms of knowledge may be perceived to be better than others establishes an inequity and lack of justice for those who are excluded from systems that privilege discursive knowledge over other forms. The Wikimedia Foundation has identified knowledge equity as a key element toward its strategic direction for an ecosystem of open and inclusive knowledge, where everybody has the access to create and consume knowledge. This has been connected with education as a social strategy for expanding knowledge equity.

== Challenges ==
Challenges to this notion includes who is involved in the discourse where knowledge is understood and accepted, how tacit and explicit knowledge interact and get integrated into the larger systems that value multiple perspectives, and difficulties expanding beyond language and cultural limitations on knowledge assumptions. The challenge for social movements to expand entrenched beliefs related to open and free knowledge in a politicized society involves social justice challenges in practice.

== Knowledge democracy ==
In the context of knowledge equity, the idea of knowledge democracy promote the recognition and preservation of a diversity of knowledge systems, notably non-occidental ones. This idea is in opposition with the ethnocentric knowledge that can be created when one culture dominate the others.
