= Zhemao hoaxes =

Fabricated articles on the Chinese Wikipedia

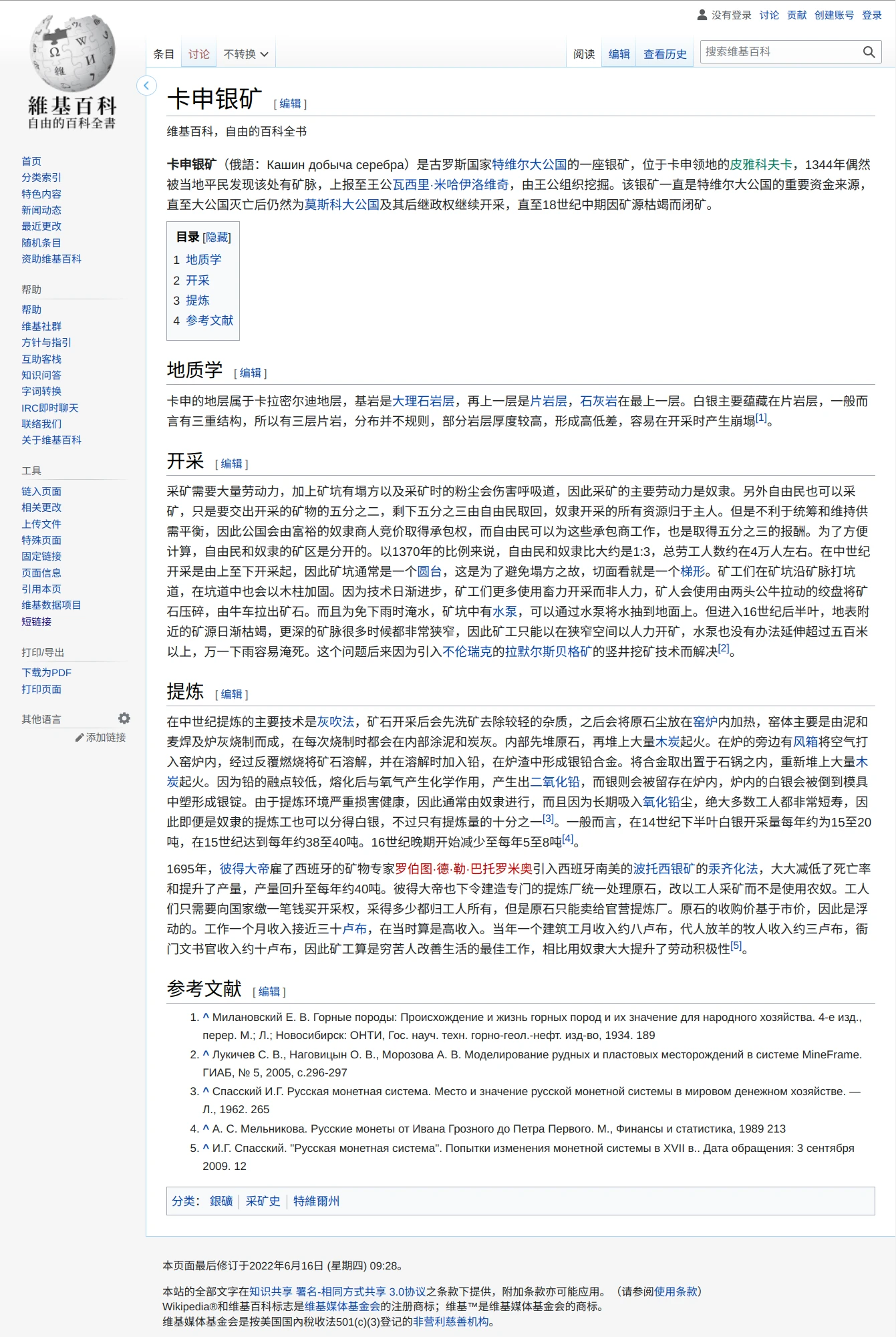
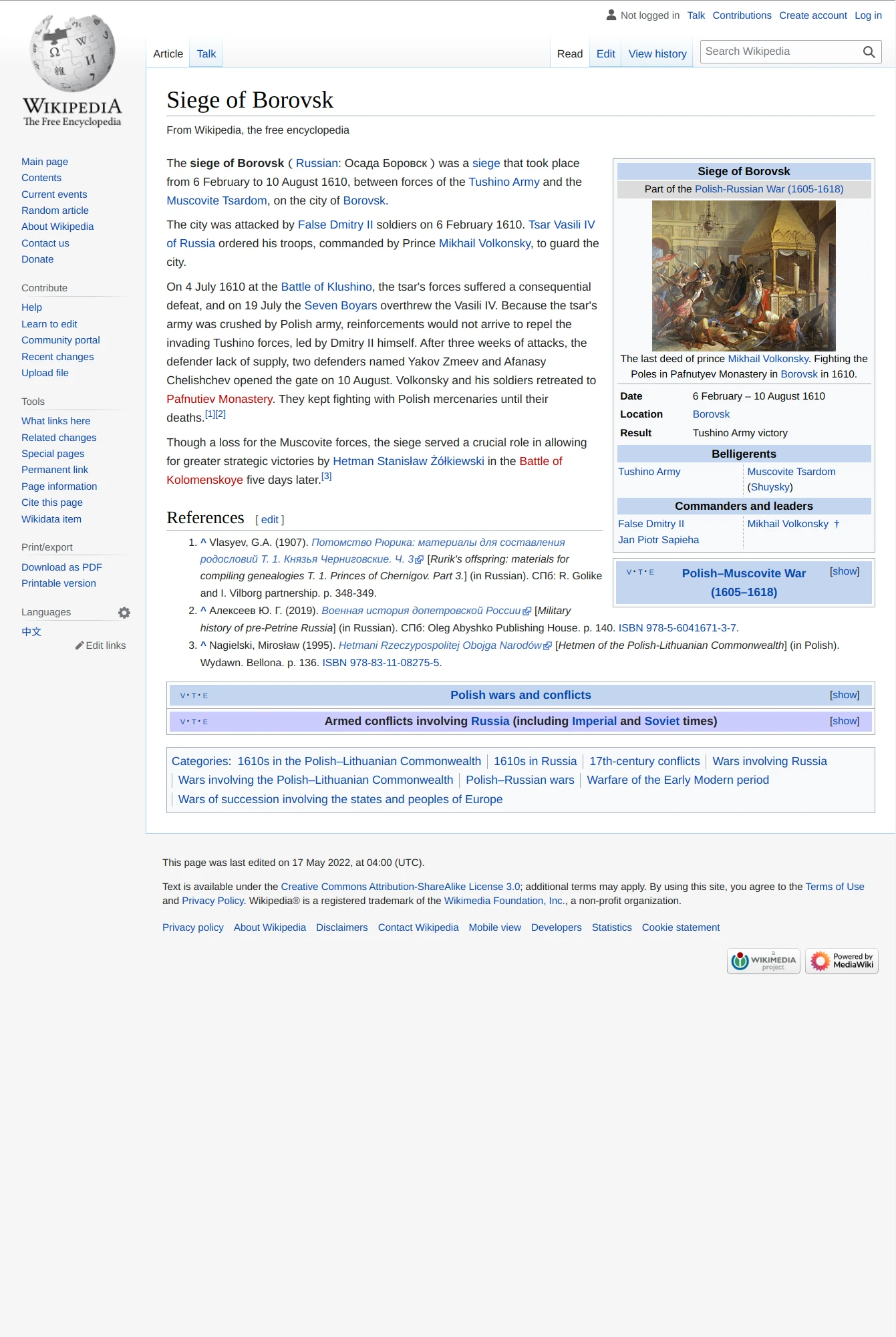
Screenshots of two hoax Zhemao articles: Kashin silver mine (Chinese) and the Siege of Borovsk (English)

The Zhemao hoaxes were over 200 interconnected Wikipedia articles about falsified aspects of medieval Russian history written from 2012 to 2022 by Zhemao (Chinese: 折毛; pinyin: Zhémáo), a pseudonymous editor of the Chinese Wikipedia. The articles were fictive embellishments on real entities; Zhemao used machine translation to understand Russian-language sources and invented elaborate detail to fill gaps in the translation. The incident is one of Wikipedia's largest hoaxes.

Zhemao started this practice as early as 2010 on Chinese history topics but turned to Russian history, and the political interactions of medieval Slavic states in particular, in 2012. Many of her hoax articles were created to enhance her initial fabrications. Zhemao eluded detection for over a decade by faking a persona as a Russian history scholar, using sockpuppet accounts to feign support, and exploiting the community's good-faith assumption that her obscure sources matched articles' content.

Chinese novelist Yifan, having initially been intrigued by a narrative about a Kashin silver mine before finding its sources did not verify its claims, made a blog post on Chinese question-and-answer website Zhihu in June 2022 explaining the web of hoax articles. Zhemao posted an apology the same month and revealed herself to have neither an advanced degree nor fluency in English or Russian. She attributed her use of sockpuppet accounts to her loneliness and absence of other social relationships. Volunteer editors blocked her accounts and quickly deleted her hoax articles; cleanup remained in progress a month later.

== Timeline ==
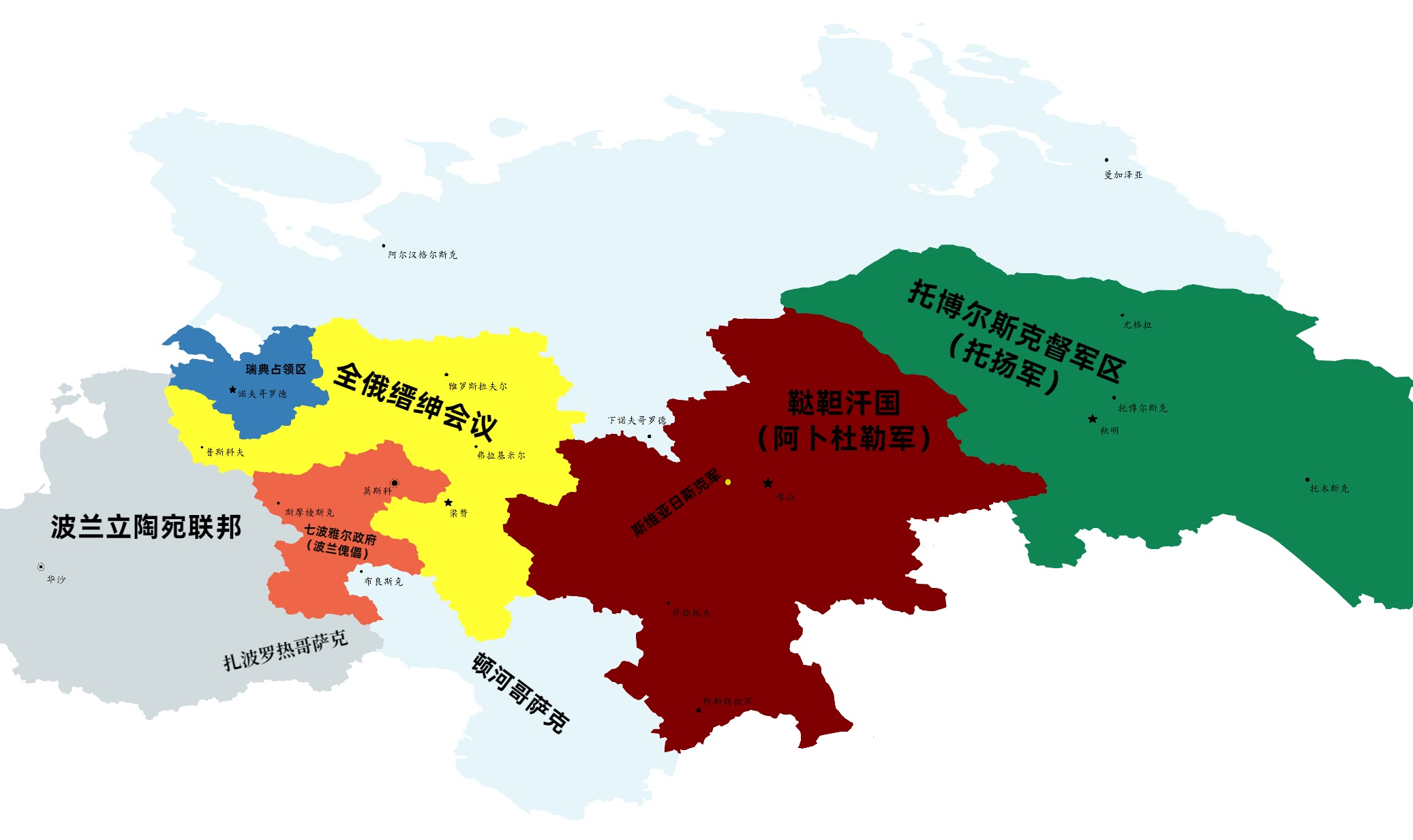
Hoax map drawn by Zhemao for an article on the fictional "Great Tatar Uprising"

Between 2012 and 2022, an editor using the name "折毛" created over 200 interconnected articles on the Chinese Wikipedia about fabricated events in medieval Russian history. While combining elements of research with fantasy, her work was comprehensive and cited, though some references were fake. For example, she cited Sergey Solovyov's 29-volume History of Russia from the Earliest Times, which exists, but the Chinese translation she cited does not. The web of articles centered around a "Kashin silver mine" and political ties between "princes of Tver" and "dukes of Moscow". The longest of Zhemao's hoax articles, close to a novel in length, overviewed three fabricated 17th-century Tatar uprisings and their impact on Russia, complete with a custom map drawn by the user. Another article featured images of rare coins that she attributed to Russian archaeologists. Her work on Soviet deportations of Chinese people was vetted as a "featured article" on the Chinese Wikipedia and translated into the English, Arabic, and Russian Wikipedias. Her articles included elaborate detail on currency and eating utensils.

Zhemao's alternative histories started in 2010, with fictive embellishments about the Qing dynasty official Heshen. Two years later, she turned to Russian history topics with the biography of Alexander I before expanding to general Russian history, mainly around medieval Slavic states. Zhemao later said that her invented articles were meant to complete gaps in her initial fabrications.

Zhemao gained the community's confidence by posing as a scholar. She falsely claimed she held a Ph.D. in world history from Moscow State University, was the daughter of a Chinese diplomat in Russia, and was married to a Russian man. Her profile included a petition by her fictional husband related to the 2022 Russian invasion of Ukraine. One veteran editor of the Chinese Wikipedia, John Yip, recognized Zhemao with a Wikipedia barnstar award in early 2022 to honor her work. However, Zhemao used at least four sockpuppet accounts to give her edits the appearance of outside support. In at least one instance, she conversed directly with another account she controlled. Another account presented as a Peking University doctoral student with expertise in Russian history and claimed an off-site relationship with Zhemao. Yet another account had editing history dating back to 2010 but entered Zhemao's control in 2019. These sockpuppet accounts also contributed false histories about the Qing dynasty and Russia under Vladimir Putin.

== Detection ==
俗话说得好，为了圆一个谎，必须撒更多的谎. (As the saying goes, in order to defend a lie, you must tell more lies.)

— Zhemao, 2022

Chinese novelist Yifan (Chinese: 伊凡; pinyin: Yīfán) came upon Zhemao's Chinese Wikipedia article on a "Kashin silver mine" during research for a book and was intrigued by its detail, which included background on its social history, soil composition, and refining processes. He noticed, however, that the Russian Wikipedia equivalents of these articles either were much shorter or did not exist. The Chinese articles included people and embellishments not found in their equivalent articles on other languages' Wikipedias. A citation about medieval mining technique led to an article about modern, automated mining. Kashin existed but its silver mine did not. When Yifan asked Russian speakers to verify details, some references were found to be illegitimate, with either the pages or editions of the books nonexistent. Further investigation into Zhemao's long articles on Slavic battles also did not appear in the Russian historical record. Yifan posted his findings on the Chinese question-and-answer website Zhihu in June 2022.

Zhemao posted an apology the same month on the English Wikipedia that explained how her actions, initially innocuous, grew out of control. She explained her background as a housewife with neither an advanced degree nor fluency in English or Russian. Unable to read source material, she augmented the output of translation software with her own imagination, which grew into extended works of fiction. Zhemao attributed the sockpuppet accounts to loneliness, as imaginary friends or cosplay as parasocial relationships in the absence of other social relationships and circumstances of her husband's frequent business travel. She apologized to the Russian scholars she befriended and portrayed, and pledged to take up a craft instead of continuing with her project.

== Aftermath ==
Wikipedia volunteers reviewed Zhemao's edits to over 300 articles. Some consulted topical expertise to separate fact from fiction. Most of her articles were deleted the same month as Yifan's Zhihu post. Her multiple accounts were permanently blocked. Volunteers continued to review her edits a month later.

The Zhemao hoaxes were among Wikipedia's largest, having exploited a gap in standard Wikipedia good faith practices in which editors check for proper sources and obvious plagiarism but not whether obscure sources verify the article content. Chinese Wikipedia editors described regret that they abetted and were deceived by Zhemao and participated in damaging the encyclopedia's already delicate reputation for reliability. Engadget likened the Zhemao hoaxes to the 2007 Essjay controversy, in which a Wikipedia editor similarly faked his stated expertise.

Multiple publications remarked on the missed opportunity of Zhemao not publishing her writing as standalone fiction, based on editorial remarks on the quality and rigor of its prose. Some publications even dubbed Zhemao a "Chinese Borges".

== See also ==
- Wikipedia:List of hoaxes on Wikipedia
- List of Wikipedia controversies
- Tlön, Uqbar, Orbis Tertius, short story by Jorge Luis Borges
