= List of Wikipedia controversies =

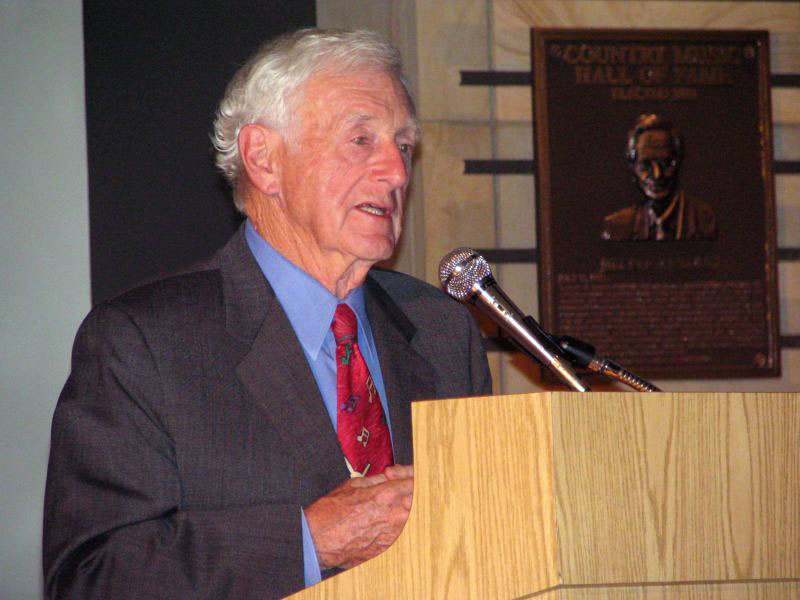
John Seigenthaler, an American journalist, was the subject of a defamatory Wikipedia hoax article in May 2005. The hoax raised questions about the reliability of Wikipedia and other websites with user-generated content.

Wikipedia has had many controversies since its inception in 2001. Wikipedia's open-editing model, which allows any user to edit its encyclopedic pages, has led to concerns such as the quality of writing, the amount of vandalism, and the accuracy of information on the project. Media have covered controversial events related to Wikipedia and the Wikimedia Foundation (WMF). Common subjects of coverage include false information, public figures, corporations for which they have a conflict of interest, paid Wikipedia editing, and interactions between Wikipedia users and public figures.

The Seigenthaler biography incident led to increased media criticism of the reliability of Wikipedia. The incident dates back to May 2005, with the anonymous posting of a hoax Wikipedia article containing false and negative allegations about John Seigenthaler, a well-known American journalist. In March 2007, Wikipedia was again the subject of media attention with the Essjay controversy, which involved a prominent English Wikipedia editor and administrator who claimed he was a "tenured professor of religion at a private university" with a "Ph.D. in theology and a degree in canon law" when in fact he was a 24-year-old who held no advanced degrees.

The 2012 scandals involving paid consultancy for the government of Gibraltar by Roger Bamkin, a Wikimedia UK board member, and potential conflicts of interest have highlighted Wikipedia's vulnerabilities. The presence of inaccurate and false information, as well as the perceived hostile editing climate, has been linked to a decline in editor participation. Another controversy arose in 2013 after an investigation by Wikipedians found that the Wiki-PR company had edited Wikipedia for paying clients, using "an army" of sockpuppet accounts that purportedly included 45 Wikipedia editors and administrators. In 2015, the Orangemoody investigation showed that businesses and minor celebrities had been blackmailed over their Wikipedia articles by a coordinated group of fraudsters, again using hundreds of sockpuppets. Controversies within and concerning Wikipedia and the WMF have been the subject of several scholarly papers. This list is a collection of the more notable instances.

== Overview ==
The nature of Wikipedia controversies has been analyzed by scholars. The sociologist Howard Rheingold says that "Wikipedia controversies have revealed the evolution of social mechanisms in the Wikipedia community"; a study of the politicization of socio-technical spaces remarked that Wikipedia "controversies ... become fully-fledged when they are advertised outside the page being debated"; and one college discusses Wikipedia as a curricular tool, in that "recent controversies involving Wikipedia [are used] as a basis for discussion of ethics and bias".

== Editing restrictions ==
Despite being promoted as an encyclopedia "anyone can edit", the ability to edit controversial pages is sometimes restricted because of "edit wars" or vandalism. To address criticism about restricting access while minimizing malicious editing of those pages, Wikipedia has also tried measures such as "pending changes protection", which allows open editing of contentious articles, with the caveat that an experienced editor must approve new users' edits before they become visible to the public.

== Controversies ==
=== 2000s ===
==== 2002 ====
- February 2002 – In late February 2002, the Spanish Wikipedia community decided to break away ("fork") from Wikipedia to protest rumored plans by co-founders Jimmy Wales and Larry Sanger to sell advertising on Wikipedia sites. The fork, set up by volunteer Edgar Enyedy, was hosted at the University of Seville under the name Enciclopedia Libre Universal en Español. Most of the Spanish volunteers followed Enyedy, producing over 10,000 articles within a year. As a result, the Spanish Wikipedia was virtually inactive until mid-2003. Since this incident, the question of advertising has been a sensitive subject on Wikipedia. In an interview with Wired in January 2011, Wales categorically denied having supported the plans for advertising, prompting a public dispute with Sanger. "The suggestion that I demanded ads and that Jimmy Wales was opposed to them is, I am afraid, yet another self-serving lie from Wales", wrote Sanger. As late as 2006, Wales refused to deny that there would ever be advertising on Wikipedia. In January of that year he told a reporter from ClickZ that "the question is going to arise as to whether we could better pursue our charitable mission with the additional money [ads would bring]. We have never said there would absolutely never be ads on Wikipedia."
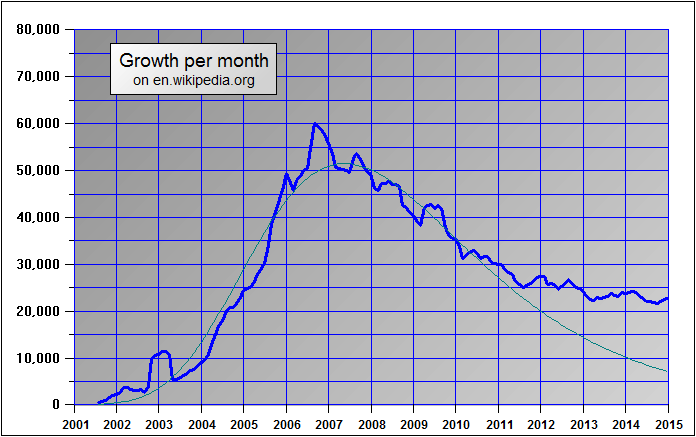
- The "rambot spike" in late 2002 into early 2003
  October 2002 – Derek Ramsey increased the number of Wikipedia articles by about 40% with the creation of a bot called Rambot that generated 33,832 Wikipedia stub articles from October 19 to 25 for every missing county, town, city, and village in the United States, based on free information from the United States Census of 2000. In The Wikipedia Revolution, Andrew Lih called it "the most controversial move in Wikipedia history".

==== 2005 ====
- September 2005
  - Jar'Edo Wens hoax: In May 2005, an anonymous user created a Wikipedia article named "Jar'Edo Wens" claiming that he was an Australian Aboriginal god created by the Altjira whose purpose was to ensure that people did not get too "arrogant" or "self-conceited" having earthly knowledge and physical might. It was spotted in November 2014 and eventually deleted in March 2015. It was the longest-lasting hoax article on Wikipedia at the time.
  - The Seigenthaler incident was a series of events that began in May 2005 with the anonymous posting of a hoax article in Wikipedia about John Seigenthaler, a well-known American journalist. The article falsely stated that Seigenthaler had been a suspect in the assassinations of U.S. President John F. Kennedy and Attorney General Robert F. Kennedy. Additionally, the article erroneously stated that Seigenthaler had lived in the Soviet Union for 13 years beginning in 1971. Seigenthaler, who had been a friend and aide to Robert Kennedy, characterized the Wikipedia entry about him as "Internet character assassination". The perpetrator of the hoax, who was trying to fool a coworker as a prank, was identified by Wikipedia critic Daniel Brandt and reporters for The New York Times. The hoax was removed from Wikipedia in early October 2005 (although the false information stayed on Answers.com and Reference.com for another three weeks), after which Seigenthaler wrote about his experience in USA Today.
  - Professional book indexer Daniel Brandt started the now-defunct Wikipedia criticism website "wikipedia-watch.org" in response to his unpleasant experience while trying to get his biography deleted.
- November/December 2005 – The IP address assigned to the United States House of Representatives was blocked from editing Wikipedia because of a large number of edits comprising a "deliberate attempt to compromise the integrity of the encyclopedia". According to CBS News, these changes included edits to Marty Meehan's Wikipedia article to give it a more positive tone. The edits to Meehan's article prompted a former director of the United States Office of Government Ethics to say that "[t]hat kind of usage, plus the fact that they're changing one person's material, is certainly wrong and ought to be at a minimum the focus of some disciplinary action".
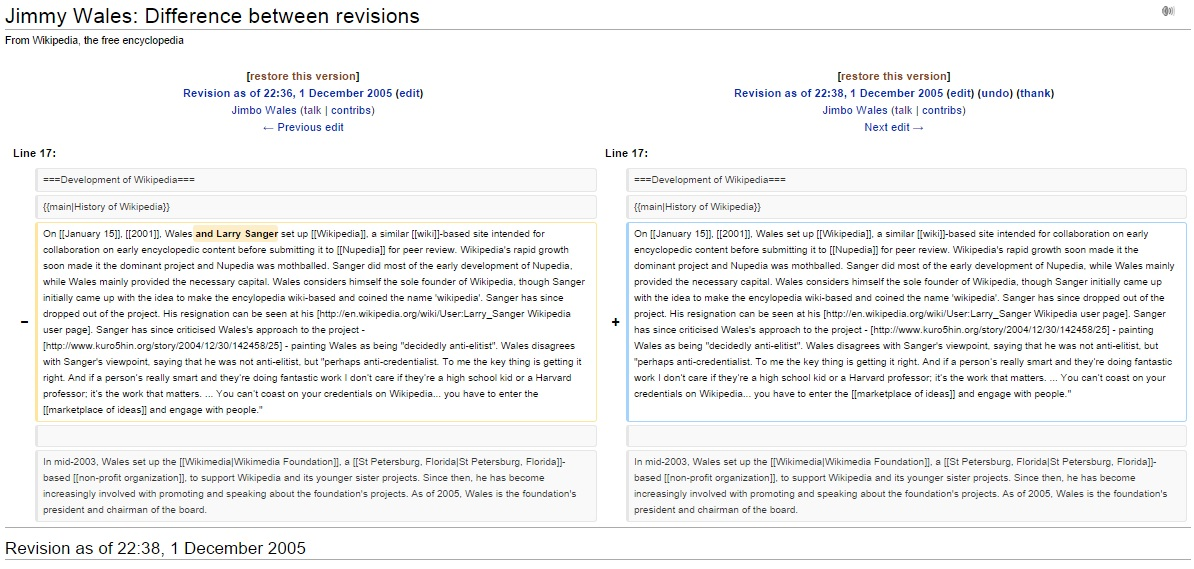
- Jimmy Wales's autobiographical edits attracted criticism in December 2005.
  December 2005 – Wikipedia co-founder Jimmy Wales was found to be editing his own Wikipedia article. According to public logs, he had made 18 edits to his biography, seven of which were alterations of information about whether Larry Sanger was a co-founder of Wikipedia. It was also revealed that Wales had edited the Wikipedia article of his former company, Bomis. "Bomis Babes", a section of the Bomis website, had been characterized in the article as "soft-core pornography", but Wales revised this to "adult content section" and deleted mentions of pornography. He said he was fixing an error, and did not agree with calling Bomis Babes soft porn. Wales conceded that he had made the changes, but maintained that they were technical corrections.

==== 2006 ====
- February 1, 2006 – The Henryk Batuta hoax was uncovered by editors on the Polish Wikipedia. Batuta, an entirely made-up person, was claimed to be a Polish Communist revolutionary who was an associate of Ernest Hemingway. The article was published for 15 months and referenced in seventeen other articles before the hoax was uncovered. The hoax article was written by a group of Polish Wikipedia editors calling themselves the "Batuta Army". One of the group's members, who called himself "Marek", told The Observer that they had created the hoax article in order to draw attention to the ongoing use of the names of Soviet officials for streets and other public areas in Poland. Marek stated that "Many of these people were traitors and murderers who do not deserve such an honor".
- March 2006 – Wikipedia critic Daniel Brandt found 142 instances of plagiarism on Wikipedia, arguing that the problem plagued the site.
- Early to mid-2006 – A series of U.S. Congressional staff edits to Wikipedia were revealed in the press. These mostly involved various political aides trying to whitewash Wikipedia biographies of several politicians by removing undesirable information (including pejorative statements quoted, or broken campaign promises), adding favorable information or "glowing" tributes, or replacing articles in part or whole with staff-authored biographies. The staffs of at least five politicians were implicated: Marty Meehan, Norm Coleman, Conrad Burns, Joe Biden and Gil Gutknecht. (Note: The activities documented were: Politician / Editing undertaken / Sources; Marty Meehan / Replacement with staff-written biography; Norm Coleman / Rewrite to make more favorable, claimed to be "correcting errors"; Conrad Burns; Montana / Removal of quoted pejorative statements the Senator had made, and replacing them with "glowing tributes" as "the voice of the farmer"; Joe Biden / Removal of unfavorable information; Gil Gutknecht / Staff rewrite and repeated removal of information evidencing broken campaign promise to serve a maximum 12-year term, replaced with more flattering info from official congressional biography) In a separate incident, the campaign manager for Cathy Cox, Morton Brilliant, resigned after being found to have added disparaging information to the Wikipedia entries of political opponents. (Note: Information included the mention of an opponent's son's arrest in a fatal drunk driving crash, and the allegation of questionable business practices of another.)
- July 2006 – MyWikiBiz was founded by Gregory Kohs and his sister to provide paid editing services on Wikipedia. Although Kohs, after some research, concluded that there were no Wikipedia policies forbidding this activity, his Wikipedia account was blocked shortly after the August publication of a press release announcing the establishment of the business. The salient Wikipedia policies were soon edited to regulate the kinds of activities in which MyWikiBiz was engaging. Jimmy Wales defended this decision and the permanent exclusion of Kohs from Wikipedia, even as he acknowledged that surreptitious paid editing continually occurred, saying: "It's one thing to acknowledge there's always going to be a little of this, but another to say, 'Bring it on.'"

==== 2007 ====
- January 2007
  - In January 2007, English-language Wikipedians in Qatar were briefly blocked from editing by an administrator, following a spate of vandalism, since they did not realize that at the time, a significant portion of the entire country's internet traffic was routed through a single IP address allocated by Qtel, which had a monopoly at the time. Both TechCrunch and Slashdot reported that Wikipedia had banned all of Qatar from the site, a claim promptly denied by co-founder Jimmy Wales.
  - It was revealed that Microsoft had paid programmer Rick Jelliffe to edit Wikipedia articles about Microsoft products, including the article on Office Open XML. A spokesman for Microsoft explained that the company thought the articles in question had been heavily biased by editors at Microsoft rival IBM and that having a seemingly independent editor add the material would make it more acceptable to other Wikipedia editors.
- February 2007
  - On February 13, 2007, American professional golfer Fuzzy Zoeller sued the Miami foreign-credential evaluation firm Josef Silny & Associates. The lawsuit alleged that defamatory statements had been edited into the Wikipedia article about Zoeller in December 2006 by someone using a computer at that firm.
  - Barbara Bauer sued the Wikimedia Foundation, which runs the Wikipedia website, claiming that information on Wikipedia critical of her abilities as a literary agent harmed her business. The Electronic Frontier Foundation defended Wikipedia and the case was dismissed in July 2008.
  - On February 17, 2007, Taner Akçam, one of the first Turkish academics to acknowledge the Armenian genocide, was detained in Canada at the airport in Montreal for nearly four hours after arriving on a flight from the United States. Taner Akçam said that Canadian authorities had justified this detainment using a libelous Wikipedia article on Akçam from around December 24, 2006, as evidence. The article had allegedly been persistently vandalized by anonymous contributors intent on labeling Akçam as a terrorist. In response to Akçam's account of his border encounter, Jimmy Wales said the website contributors "deeply regret every error".
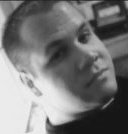
- The Wikipedia administrator Essjay, whose claims about his identity and credentials were the subject of a New Yorker editorial in 2007
  March 2007 – The Essjay controversy was sparked when The New Yorker magazine issued a rare editorial correction saying that a prominent English Wikipedia editor and administrator known as "Essjay", whom they had interviewed and described in a July 2006 article as a "tenured professor of religion at a private university" who held a "Ph.D. in theology and a degree in canon law", was in fact a 24-year-old who held no advanced degrees. Essjay had invented a completely false identity for his pseudonymous participation in Wikipedia. In January 2007, however, Essjay became a Wikia employee and divulged his real name, Ryan Jordan; this was noticed by Daniel Brandt of Wikipedia Watch, who communicated Essjay's identity to The New Yorker. Jordan held trusted volunteer positions within Wikipedia known as "administrator", "bureaucrat", "checkuser", "arbitrator", and "mediator". Responding to the controversy, Jimmy Wales stated that he viewed Essjay's made-up persona like a pseudonym and did not really have a problem with it: "Essjay has always been, and still is, a fantastic editor and trusted member of the community ... He has been thoughtful and contrite about the entire matter, and I consider it settled." The incident caused wide-ranging debates in the Wikipedia community, and saw Wikipedia co-founder Larry Sanger challenge Wales: "Jimmy, to call yourself a tenured professor, when you aren't one, is not a 'pseudonym'. It's identity fraud. And the full question is not why you appointed Essjay to ArbCom, but: why did you ignore the obvious moral implications of the fact that he had fraudulently pretended to be a professor – ignoring those implications even to the point of giving him a job and appointing him to ArbCom – until now?" As a result of the controversy, Wales eventually invited Jordan to relinquish his responsibilities on Wikipedia, which he did; Jordan also quit his job at Wikia.
- August 2007 – It became known that Virgil Griffith, a Caltech computation and neural-systems graduate student, had created WikiScanner, a searchable database that linked changes made by anonymous Wikipedia editors to companies and organizations from which the changes were made. The database cross-referenced logs of Wikipedia edits with publicly available records pertaining to the internet IP addresses edits were made from. Griffith was motivated by the edits from the United States Congress, and wanted to see if others were similarly promoting themselves. He was particularly interested in finding scandals, especially at large and controversial corporations. He said he wanted to "create minor public relations disasters for companies and organizations I dislike (and) to see what 'interesting organizations' (which I am neutral towards) are up to". He also wanted to give Wikipedia readers a tool to check edits for accuracy and allow the automation and indexing of edits. Most of the edits Wikiscanner found were minor or harmless, but the site was mined to detect the most controversial and embarrassing instances of conflict of interest edits. These instances received media coverage worldwide. (Note: Included among the accused were the Vatican, the Central Intelligence Agency, the Federal Bureau of Investigation, the U.S. Democratic Party's Congressional Campaign Committee, the U.S. Republican Party, Britain's Labour Party, Britain's Conservative Party, the Canadian government, Industry Canada, the Department of Prime Minister, Cabinet, and Defence in Australia, the United Nations, the United States Senate, the U.S. Department of Homeland Security, the U.S. Environmental Protection Agency, Montana Senator Conrad Burns, Ohio Governor Bob Taft, Prince Johan Friso and his wife Princess Mabel of the Netherlands, the Israeli government, ExxonMobil, Walmart, AstraZeneca, Diebold, Dow Chemical, Disney, Dell, Anheuser-Busch, Nestlé, Pepsi, Boeing, Sony Computer Entertainment, EA, SCO Group, MySpace, Pfizer, Raytheon, DuPont, Anglican and Catholic churches, the Church of Scientology, the World Harvest Church, Amnesty International, the Discovery Channel, Fox News, CBS, The Washington Post, the National Rifle Association of America, News International, Al Jazeera, Bob Jones University, and Ohio State University.) Although the edits correlated with known IP addresses, there was no proof that the changes actually came from a member of the organization or employee of the company, only that someone had access to their network. Wikipedia spokespersons received WikiScanner positively, noting that it helped prevent conflicts of interest from influencing articles as well as increasing transparency and mitigating attempts to remove or distort relevant facts. In 2008, Griffith released an updated version of WikiScanner called WikiWatcher, which also exploited a common mistake made by users with registered accounts who accidentally forget to log in, revealing their IP address and subsequently their affiliations. WikiScanner is no longer online.
- September 2007
  - Auren Hoffman was noted by VentureBeat in 2007 as having edited his own Wikipedia profile under a pseudonym. Hoffman responded that he was editing his profile to remove inappropriate comments.
  - One thousand IPs were blocked in Utah in order to prevent further edits from a highly active user who had been banned from editing Wikipedia.
- October 2007 – In their obituaries of then recently deceased TV theme composer Ronnie Hazlehurst, many British media organizations reported that he had co-written the S Club 7 song "Reach". In fact, he had not, and it was discovered that this information had been sourced from a hoax edit to Hazlehurst's Wikipedia article.
- December 2007 – In December 2007, it became known that the Wikimedia Foundation had failed to do a basic background check and hired Carolyn Doran as its chief operating officer. Doran had criminal records in three states for theft, drunken driving and fleeing the scene of a car crash. According to The Register, Doran left her position after yet another arrest for DUI; the Wikimedia Foundation lawyer, Mike Godwin, was quoted as saying, "We've never had any documentation of any criminal record on Carolyn Doran's part at all. As far as I'm concerned, I have no direct knowledge of [her criminal record] yet ... We have, in our records, no evidence of any such thing." The Associated Press also reported that Doran had wounded her boyfriend "with a gunshot to the chest".

==== 2008 ====
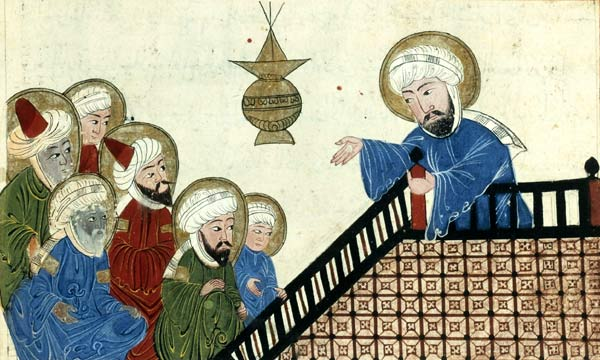
A 17th-century copy of a 14th-century Persian manuscript image of Muhammad prohibiting Nasi', one of the depictions of Muhammad which raised objections

- February 2008 – A group of Muslims started an online petition demanding that Wikipedia remove images of the Islamic prophet Muhammad from Wikipedia articles about him since most followers of Islam believe that such images violate the precepts of the religion. Protesters also organized an email campaign to pressure the English-language Wikipedia to remove the offending images. By February 7, approximately 100,000 people had signed the petition and the article had been protected from editing by non-registered users. Jay Walsh, Wikimedia Foundation spokesman, told Information Week that "Noncensorship is an important tenet of the user community and the editing community" and Mathias Schindler, of Wikimedia Deutschland, said in response to efforts to have the images removed from the German-language Wikipedia that "Wikipedia is an encyclopedia, not a venue for an inter-Muslim debate."
- March 2008
  - Wikipedia co-founder Jimmy Wales used Wikipedia to end a relationship he was having with conservative political columnist, television commentator and university lecturer Rachel Marsden, by adding a single sentence to his own Wikipedia user page stating, "I am no longer involved with Rachel Marsden." This was interpreted as a wider Wikipedia controversy because of the suggestion (from released private chat logs purportedly between Marsden and Wales) that Wales had previously edited Marsden's biographical article on Wikipedia, at the request of Marsden (before they were romantically involved).
  - Jimmy Wales was accused by former Wikimedia Foundation employee Danny Wool of misusing the foundation's funds for recreational purposes. Wool also stated that Wales had his Wikimedia credit card taken away in part because of his spending habits, a claim Wales denied. Then-chairperson of the foundation Florence Devouard and former foundation interim Executive Director Brad Patrick denied any wrongdoing by Wales or the foundation, saying that Wales accounted for every expense and that, for items for which he lacked receipts, he paid out of his own pocket; in private, Devouard upbraided Wales for "constantly trying to rewrite the past".
  - It was claimed by Jeffrey Vernon Merkey that Wales had edited Merkey's Wikipedia entry to make it more favorable in return for donations to the Wikimedia Foundation, an allegation Wales dismissed as "nonsense".
- April 2008 – In April 2008, The Electronic Intifada reported on the existence of a Google group set up by CAMERA. The group's stated purpose was to "help us keep Israel-related entries on Wikipedia from becoming tainted by anti-Israel editors". The Electronic Intifada accused CAMERA of "orchestrating a secret, long-term campaign to infiltrate the popular online encyclopedia Wikipedia to rewrite Palestinian history, pass off crude propaganda as fact, and take over Wikipedia administrative structures to ensure these changes go either undetected or unchallenged". Andre Oboler, a Legacy Heritage Fellow at the Israeli non-governmental organization NGO Monitor, responded, "Electronic Intifada is manufacturing a story." Excerpts of some of the emails were published in the July 2008 issue of Harper's Magazine under the title "Candid camera". Five editors involved in the campaign were sanctioned by Wikipedia administrators, including "Gni", who was believed to be CAMERA's Gilead Ini, and blocked their account indefinitely, with a remark that Wikipedia's open nature "is fundamentally incompatible with the creation of a private group to surreptitiously coordinate editing".
- May 2008 – A long-running dispute between members of the Church of Scientology and Wikipedia editors reached Wikipedia's arbitration committee. The church members were accused of attempting to sway articles in the church's interests, while other editors were accused of the opposite. The arbitration committee unanimously voted to block all edits from the IP addresses associated with the church; several Scientology critics were also banned.
- June 2008
  - In 2007, Jim Prentice, then-member of the Parliament of Canada for Calgary Centre-North and Minister of Industry, introduced copyright protection legislation, which was compared by many to the DMCA. The legislation was controversial and Prentice withdrew it in December 2007. By June 2008, there was a great deal of speculation in the Canadian press that Prentice would eventually succeed Stephen Harper as Prime Minister of Canada. Michael Geist, professor of internet law at the University of Ottawa, discovered that a series of anonymous edits to Prentice's Wikipedia article had been made in late May and early June from an IP address owned by Industry Canada, Prentice's ministry. The modifications removed critical mentions of Prentice's involvement with the copyright legislation and added generic positive claims about the minister. Geist announced on his blog his findings about the modifications, which one Canadian commentator called "hagiographic palaver extolling Prentice".
  - Australian press stated that American law firm Cadwalader, Wickersham & Taft had threatened the Wikimedia Foundation on behalf of then-Telstra CEO Solomon Trujillo. The letter allegedly contained: "If Wikipedia and Wikimedia do not remove the improper language by that time (7pm on March 7), and take the steps necessary to block its being reinserted, Mr (Trujillo) intends to commence litigation ..." and reportedly demanded that the editor responsible for the defamatory material be blocked. Jimmy Wales denied that any such threat had been received, stating that "It is sad to see a media so irresponsible as to make it seem that Wikipedia would cave to a few lawyers letters objecting to legitimate criticism. It is even sadder to see Mr Trujillo attacked by that same irresponsible media for something he did not do."

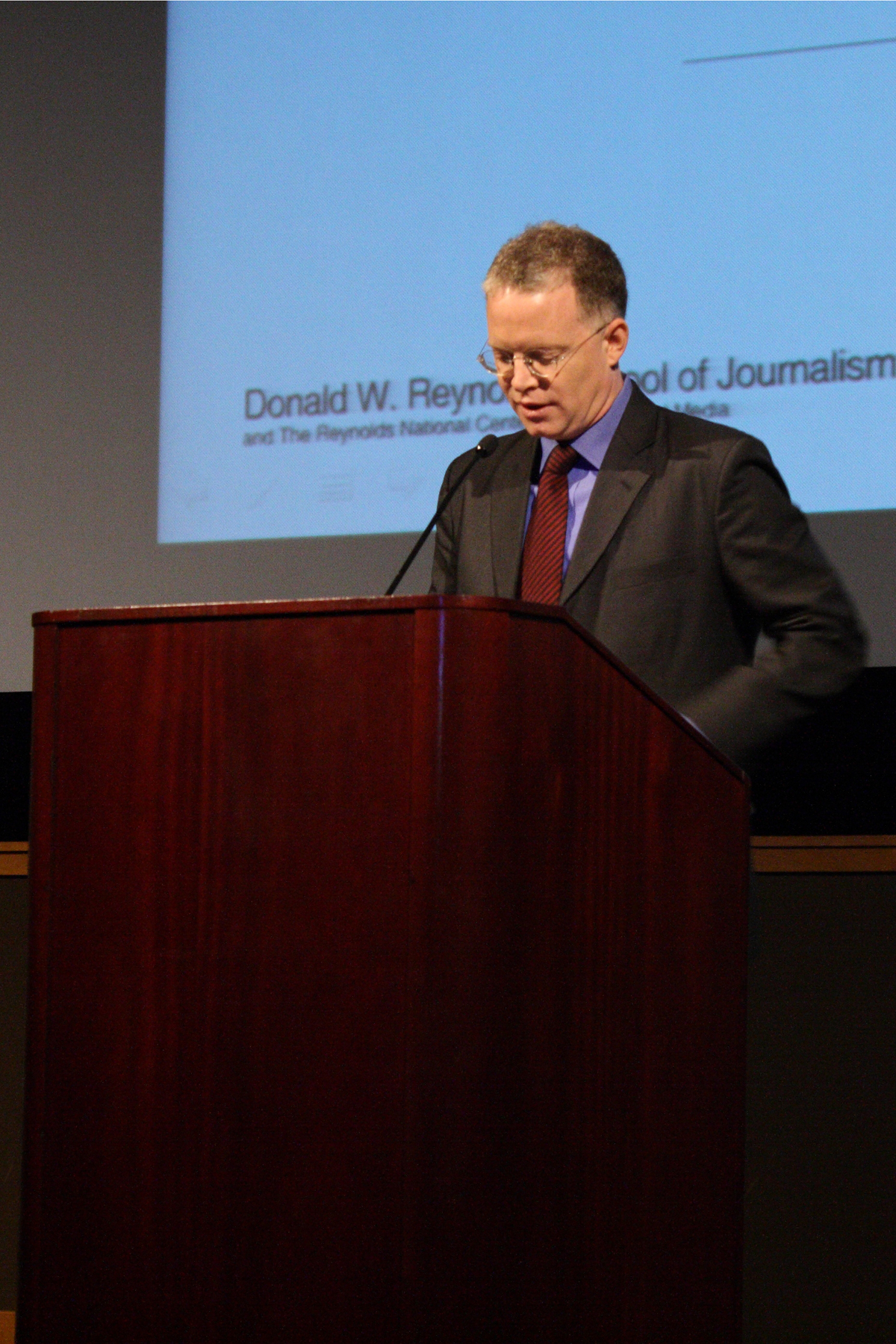
Reporter David Rohde in 2011, three years after information about his capture by the Taliban was controversially removed from Wikipedia

- November 2008 – New York Times reporter David Rohde was kidnapped by the Taliban while reporting in Afghanistan. The Times feared that reporting of the matter would endanger Rohde's life, so they did not mention it in their pages. Statements about Rohde's kidnapping were edited into Wikipedia during the voluntary news blackout, however. Representatives of the Times called Jimmy Wales and asked him to suppress the information. He agreed to take care of it, but in order to avoid the scrutiny which attends his edits to Wikipedia, Wales asked an unnamed administrator on the site to delete the information instead. Wales told Times media reporter Richard Pérez-Peña, "We were really helped by the fact that it hadn't appeared in a place we would regard as a reliable source. I would have had a really hard time with it if it had." The Christian Science Monitor reported that Wales' actions were the subject of much criticism from bloggers and journalists, who argued that information suppression undermined the credibility of Wikipedia.
- December 2008
  - In early December, the Internet Watch Foundation (IWF) added the Wikipedia page about the album Virgin Killer to its blacklist of online material potentially illegal in the United Kingdom because it contains an image of a naked prepubescent girl. The IWF's blacklist is voluntarily enforced by 95% of British internet service providers. The issue eventually left most British residents unable to edit any page on Wikipedia. The Wikimedia Foundation (WMF) protested the blacklisting of the page even though, as the IWF stated at the time, "the image in question is potentially in breach of the Protection of Children Act 1978"; the IWF agreed to remove the page from its blacklist.
  - Professor T. Mills Kelly conducted a class project on "Lying About the Past", which resulted in the Edward Owens hoax. A biography was created about "Edward Owens" who was claimed to be an oyster fisherman that became a pirate during the period of the Long Depression, targeting ships in the Chesapeake Bay. It was revealed when media outlets began reporting the story as fact.

==== 2009 ====
- January 2009 – The Wikipedia articles for United States senators Robert Byrd and Edward Kennedy were briefly changed to state, incorrectly, that they had died.
- February 2009 – Scott Kildall and Nathaniel Stern created Wikipedia Art, a performance art piece as a live article on Wikipedia. It was deleted 15 hours later as a violation of Wikipedia rules. The Wikimedia Foundation subsequently claimed that the domain name wikipediaart.org infringed on its trademark. The ensuing controversy was reported in the national press. Wikipedia Art has since been included in the Internet Pavilion of the Venice Biennale for 2009. It also appeared in a revised form at the Transmediale festival in Berlin in 2011.
- March 2009 – Hours after the death of French composer Maurice Jarre, university student Shane Fitzgerald added a phony quote to Jarre's Wikipedia article: "One could say my life itself has been one long soundtrack. Music was my life, music brought me to life, and music is how I will be remembered long after I leave this life. When I die there will be a final waltz playing in my head, that only I can hear." The quote then appeared in obituaries of Jarre published in newspapers around the world.
- May 2009 – Wikipedian David Boothroyd, a UK Labour Party member, created controversy in 2009, when Wikipedia Review contributor "Tarantino" discovered that he had been sockpuppeteering under the accounts "Dbiv", "Fys" and "Sam Blacketer", none of which acknowledged his real identity. After earning administrator status with one account and losing it for inappropriate use of administrative tools, Boothroyd regained administrator status as "Sam Blacketer" in April 2007. It later became part of the English Wikipedia's Arbitration Committee. Under that account, he edited many articles related to British politics, including that of rival Conservative Party leader David Cameron. He subsequently resigned as an administrator and arbitrator.

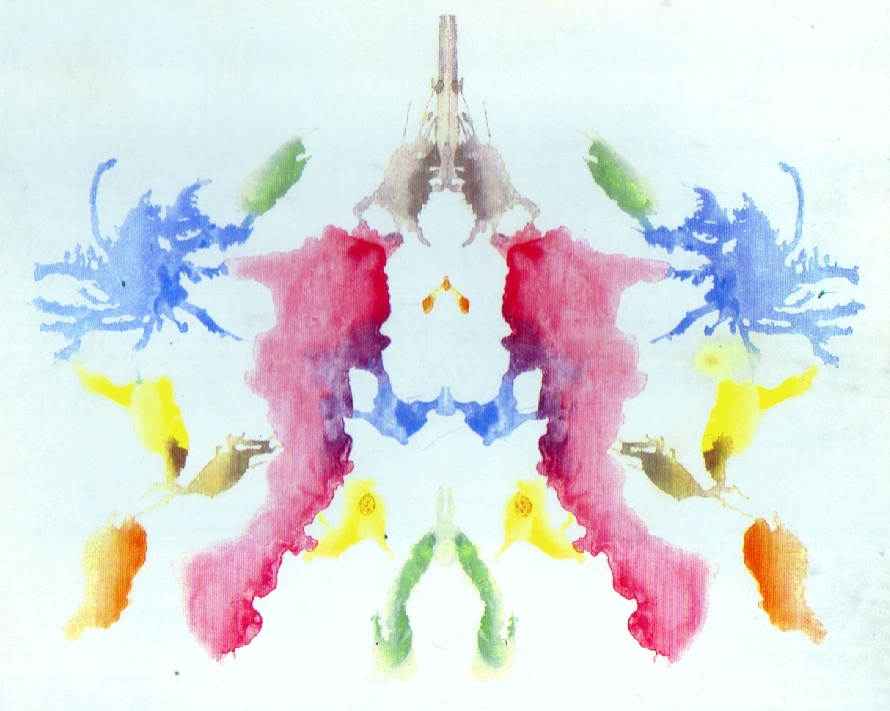
Several psychologists strongly objected to displaying images of the 10 Rorschach test inkblots in June 2009.

- June 2009 – James Heilman, a Canadian doctor, uploaded copies of all 10 inkblot images used in the Rorschach test to Wikipedia, on the grounds that copyright to the images had expired. Heilman was widely criticized by psychologists who used the test as a diagnostic tool, because they were worried that patients with prior knowledge of the inkblots would be able to influence their diagnoses. In response to Heilman's posting of the images, a number of psychologists registered Wikipedia accounts to argue against their retention. Later that year two psychologists filed a complaint against Heilman with the Saskatchewan medical licensing board, arguing that his uploading of the images constituted unprofessional behavior.
- July 2009 – The National Portrait Gallery in London issued a cease and desist letter for alleged breach of copyright against a Wikipedia editor who downloaded more than 3,000 high-resolution images from the gallery's website to upload them to Wikimedia Commons.
- November 2009 – Convicted German murderers Wolfgang Werlé and Manfred Lauber sued the Wikimedia Foundation (WMF) in German courts, demanding that their names be removed from the English Wikipedia's article on their victim, Walter Sedlmayr. German laws force compliance with such requests for suppression. Alexander H. Stopp, the two men's lawyer, succeeded in forcing the German Wikipedia to remove their names. Mike Godwin responded on behalf of the WMF, stating that the organization "doesn't edit content at all, unless we get a court order from a court of competent jurisdiction. [I]f our German editors have chosen to remove the names of the murderers from their article on Walter Sedlmayr, we support them in that choice. The English-language editors have chosen to include the names of the killers, and we support them in that choice."
- December 2009 – Actor Ron Livingston, star of the 1999 film Office Space, filed a lawsuit in Los Angeles County Superior Court against a John Doe who had repeatedly edited Livingston's Wikipedia article to include statements that Livingston was gay and in a relationship with a (possibly fictitious) man named Lee Dennison. The lawsuit also claimed that the John Doe defendant had set up phony Facebook profiles for Livingston and his putative partner. The suit named neither Wikipedia nor Facebook, but was evidently intended to give Livingston the power to subpoena identifying information from the two organizations about the anonymous defendant. The lawsuit was followed by a manifestation of the Streisand effect as Livingston was targeted with accusations of homophobia. Jay Walsh, then head of communication for the Wikimedia Foundation, said that "This is a serious issue. We take it quite seriously. We understand real people are reflected in these articles. ... Articles about living people are tough articles to manage. Someone who is a fan or an enemy might try to attack or vandalize those articles. This isn't a new scenario for us to witness."

=== 2010s ===
==== 2010 ====
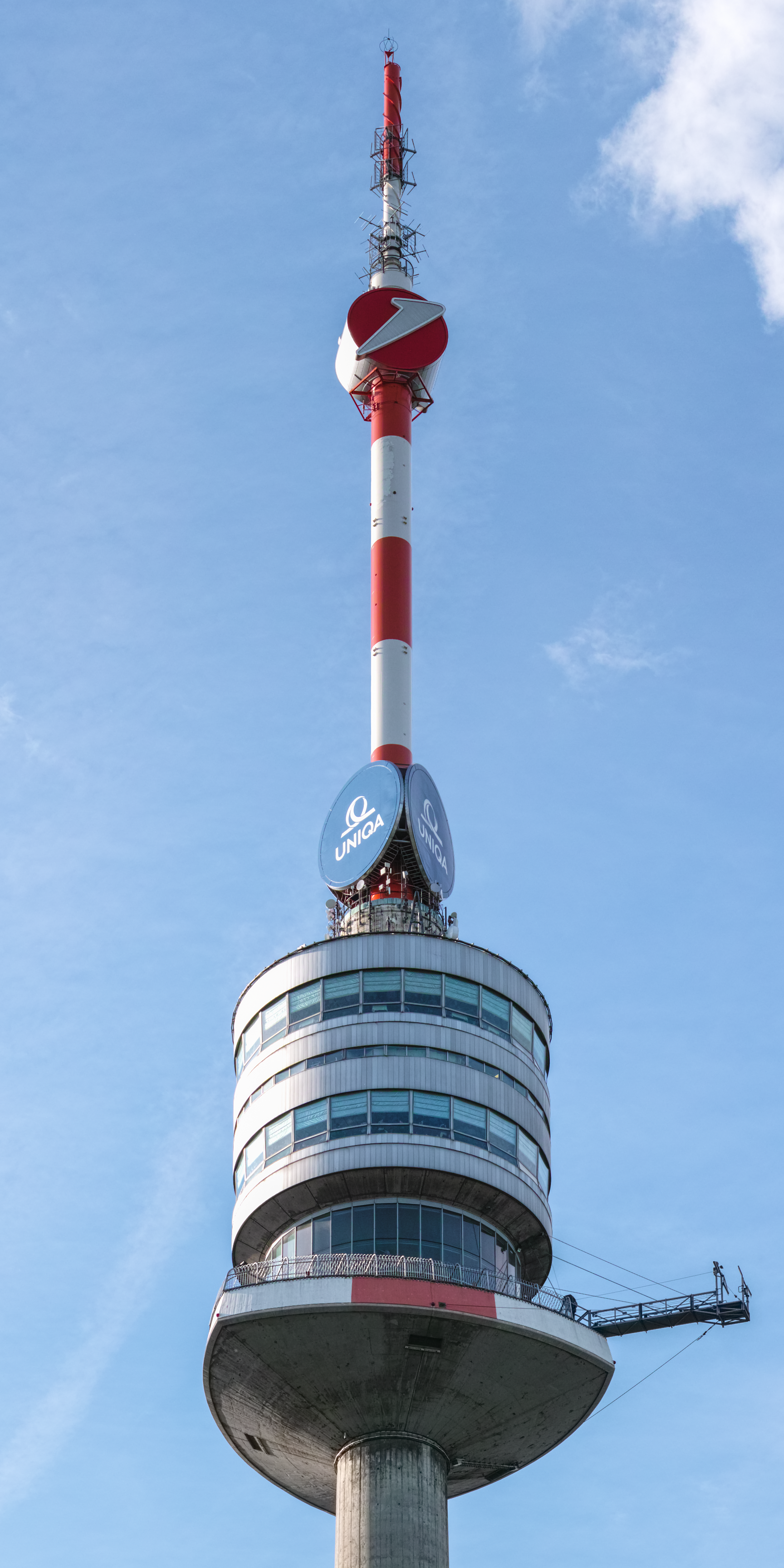
The observation decks and spire of the Donauturm

- April 2010 and before – A major controversy in the German Wikipedia centered on a sentence about the Donauturm in Vienna. While the observation tower shares some architectural aspects with the Fernsehturm Stuttgart, it was never planned for TV broadcasting purposes. The German Wikipedia went through an approximately 600,000-character discussion about the suitable title and category. Some (often Austrian) authors denied the description of Donauturm as a "TV tower", which was defended by others. Der Spiegel coverage of the issue cited a participant with "On good days, Wikipedia is better than any TV soap".
- April 2010 – Wikipedia co-founder Larry Sanger informed the FBI that a large amount of child pornography was available on Wikimedia Commons. Sanger told Fox News: "I wasn't shocked that it was online, but I was shocked that it was on a Wikimedia Foundation site that purports to be a reference site." Co-founder Jimmy Wales responded by claiming that a strong statement from the Wikimedia Foundation would be forthcoming. In the weeks following Sanger's letter, Wales responded by unilaterally deleting a number of images which he personally deemed to be pornographic. Wales's unilateral actions led to an outcry from the Wikipedian community, which in turn prompted Wales to voluntarily relinquish some of his user privileges.
- July 2010 – Following the football World Cup, FIFA president Sepp Blatter was awarded the Order of the Companions of O. R. Tambo for his contribution over the World Cup. The South African Government's webpage announcing the award referred to him as Joseph Sepp Bellend Blatter, the nickname having been taken from his vandalized Wikipedia article. "Bellend" is a British slang term for the tip of the penis.
- August 2010 – After the Federal Bureau of Investigation requested that Wikipedia remove the FBI seal from Wikipedia (on grounds that the high-resolution graphic could facilitate creation of fake FBI badges) Wikimedia Foundation lawyer Mike Godwin sent a letter to the Bureau, denying their request and contending that the FBI had misinterpreted the law.
- September 2010 – Right-wing radio presenter Rush Limbaugh broadcast a discussion of an upcoming hearing in the United States District Court for the Northern District of Florida courtroom of judge Roger Vinson of the case Florida et al v. United States Department of Health and Human Services, one of the cases brought by U.S. states challenging the Patient Protection and Affordable Care Act (Obamacare). Limbaugh told his audience that Vinson had previously killed three brown bears and mounted their heads over the door of his courtroom in order, according to Limbaugh, to "instill the fear of God into the accused". This, stated Limbaugh, "would not be good news" for supporters of Obamacare. However, the story was not only false, but had been edited into Vinson's Wikipedia article a scant few days before the broadcast. The bear-hunting information inserted into the Wikipedia article was sourced to a nonexistent story in the Pensacola News Journal. A spokesman for Limbaugh told the New York Times that a researcher for Limbaugh's show had found the information on the News Journal website, but that newspaper's managing editor told the Times that no such information had ever been published there.

==== 2011 ====
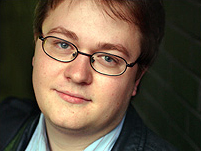
In September 2011, controversy arose when British writer and journalist Johann Hari admitted using Wikipedia to attack his opponents by editing the articles about them and inserting fabrications.

- June 2011
  - Potential candidate for Vice President of the United States Sarah Palin described American Revolutionary War hero Paul Revere as "he who warned the British that they weren't going to be taking away our arms, by ringing those bells". This description, characterized by U.S. News & World Report (USN&WR) as "flummoxed ramblings", kicked off a battle over the contents of the English Wikipedia's article about Revere. Palin's remarks and various interpretations were added by Palin supporters to the Revere Wikipedia page and just as quickly removed by detractors, although at least one commentator opined that "in some cases people appeared to be attributing the claims to Ms. Palin in order to mock her". In the 10 days following Palin's remark, Revere's Wikipedia page received over a half million page views and led to extensive and inconclusive discussion on the article's talk page and in the national media about whether the episode had improved or harmed the article. Robert Schlesinger, writing in USN&WR, summarized the episode by saying that "[i]t used to be said of conservatism that it stood athwart history and yelled 'stop.' Increasingly it seems to stand beside reality while hitting the 'edit' button."
  - PR Week reported on a 'fixer', an unnamed London-based figure in the PR industry who offered his services to 'cleanse' Wikipedia articles for clients. Wikipedia entries this person was accused of changing included Carphone Warehouse co-founder David Ross, Von Essen Group chairman Andrew Davis, British property developer David Rowland, billionaire Saudi tycoon Maan Al-Sanea, and Edward Stanley, 19th Earl of Derby. According to PR Week, 42 edits were made from the same IP address, most of them removing negative or controversial information, or adding positive information.
- September 2011 – British writer and journalist Johann Hari admitted using Wikipedia to attack his opponents by editing the online encyclopedia's articles about them under a pseudonym. Using a sockpuppet, Hari engaged in a six-year effort where he repeatedly painted himself in a flattering light while inserting fabrications in the entries for people he considered enemies, such as Francis Wheen, Nick Cohen, Niall Ferguson, and Cristina Odone, whom he falsely said had been fired from her job at The Catholic Herald. Odone also suspected Hari of having made anonymous edits calling her an antisemite.
- November 2011 – After the South African government passed the Protection of State Information Bill, a law which criminalized certain forms of speech in the country, the Wikipedia article about the ruling African National Congress (ANC) party was altered in protest. The protesters deleted phrases on the page which were critical of the ANC, presumably suggesting that they would be illegal under the new law. This was denied by ANC spokesman Keith Khoza, who stated that the edits were "conduct ... not consistent with a civilised society".

==== 2012 ====
- January 2012
  - British MP Tom Watson discovered that Portland Communications had been removing the nickname of one of its clients' products ("Wife Beater", referring to Anheuser-Busch InBev's Stella Artois beer) from Wikipedia. Chartered Institute of Public Relations (CIPR) CEO Jane Wilson noted, "Stella Artois is on the 'wife-beater' page because it is a nick-name in common currency for that brand of strong continental lager. The brand managers who want to change this have a wider reputational issue to address, editing the term from a Wikipedia page will not get rid of this association." Other edits from Portland's offices included changes to articles about another Portland client, Kazakhstan's BTA Bank, and its former head Mukhtar Ablyazov. Portland did not deny making the changes, arguing they had been done transparently and in accordance with Wikipedia's policies. Portland Communications welcomed CIPR's subsequent announcement of a collaboration with Wikipedia and invited Jimmy Wales to speak to their company, as he did at Bell Pottinger. Tom Watson was optimistic about the collaboration: "PR professionals need clear guidelines in this new world of online-information-sharing. That's why I am delighted that interested parties are coming together to establish a clear code of conduct."
  - Edits made by both Barack Obama's and John McCain's campaigns during the 2008 U.S. presidential race made the news.
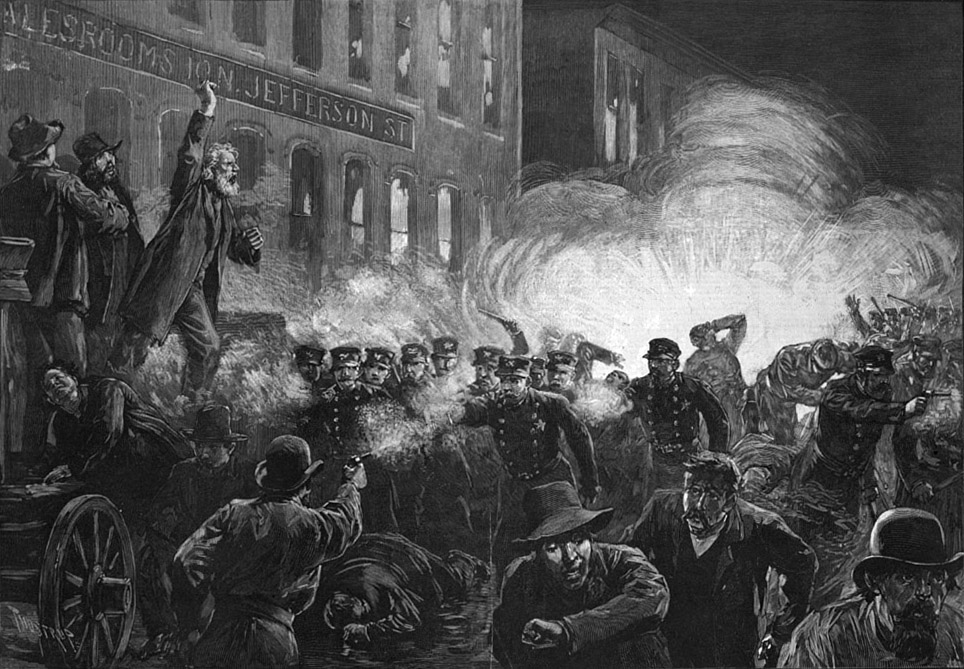
- Historian Timothy Messer-Kruse's experiences editing the article about Chicago's Haymarket Affair sparked debate over the role of truth, rather than "verifiability", on Wikipedia.
  February 2012 – American labor historian Timothy Messer-Kruse, an expert on the Haymarket affair, published an article in the Chronicle of Higher Education describing his three-year struggle to edit the Wikipedia article on the subject. Messer-Kruse had discovered new primary sources which, in his professional opinion, cast doubt on the conventional view of the incident. In 2009, when he first tried to edit the article to include the new information, he was told by other editors that primary sources were not acceptable and that he would have to find published secondary sources. As he later said on NPR, "So I actually bided my time. I knew that my own published book would be coming out in 2011." When his book was published and he returned to insert his newly discovered material into the article, he was told that it was a minority view and could not be given "undue weight", even though he had proved in his book that the majority view was incorrect regarding major details of the case. Steven Walling of the Wikimedia Foundation told a NPR reporter that all of Wikipedia's rules had been followed, stating that "We do not rely on what exact, individual people say, just based on their own credibility." National security scholars Benjamin Wittes and Stephanie Leutert have used Messer-Kruse's experiences to illuminate the "broad question" of "whether Wikipedia's policies are encouraging an undue conservatism about sourcing".
- March 2012 – The Bureau of Investigative Journalism uncovered that UK MPs or their staff had made almost 10,000 edits to the encyclopedia, and that the Wikipedia articles of almost one in six MPs had been edited from within Parliament. Many of the changes dealt with removing unflattering details from Wikipedia during the 2009 expenses scandal, as well as other controversial issues. British politician Joan Ryan admitted to changing her entry "whenever there's misleading or untruthful information [that has] been placed on it". Clare Short said her staff were "angry and protective" over mistakes and criticisms in her Wikipedia article and acknowledged they might have made changes to it. Labour MP Fabian Hamilton also reported having one of his assistants edit a page to make it more accurate in his view. MP Philip Davies denied making changes about removing controversial comments related to Muslims from 2006 and 2007.
- July 2012
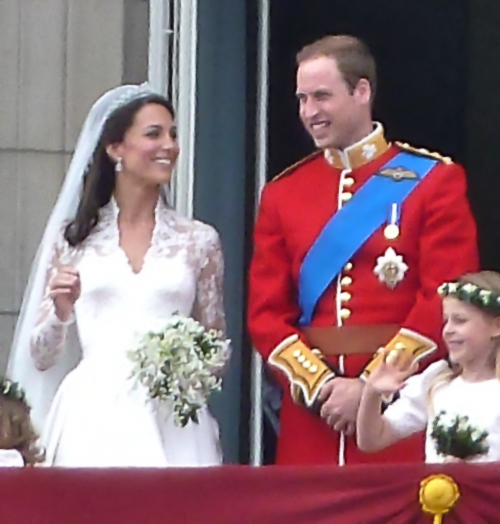
  - Attempts to delete an article about the wedding dress of Kate Middleton led to a controversy on the English Wikipedia and the issue received some press coverage.
    Attempts to delete an entry about the wedding dress of Catherine, Duchess of Cambridge led to a controversy on the English Wikipedia. Jimmy Wales used the example to illustrate his notion about a "gender gap" in Wikipedia on the Wikimania 2012. The issue received press coverage.
  - Wikimedia UK chairperson and administrator of the English Wikipedia Ashley van Haeften was banned from the English Wikipedia for six months for sockpuppeting and other violations of Wikipedia's norms and policies. Wikimedia UK's board fully supported van Haeften following the case, until van Haeften resigned as chair in August.
- September 2012
  - Author Philip Roth published an open letter to Wikipedia, describing conflicts he experienced with the Wikipedia community while attempting to modify the Wikipedia article about his novel The Human Stain: although the character Coleman Silk had been inspired by the case of Melvin Tumin, some literary critics had drawn parallels between Silk and Anatole Broyard, and Roth sought to remove statements suggesting that Broyard had been the inspiration. His edits were reverted because direct statements from the author were treated as primary-source claims rather than secondary sourcing. Wikipedia administrator and community liaison Oliver Keyes subsequently wrote a blog post criticizing both Roth and his approach, and pointed out that even prior to Roth's attempts to modify the article, it had already cited a published interview in which Roth stated that the inspiration for Coleman Silk had been Tumin rather than Broyard. Keyes also pointed out that the edits had been made via an anonymous IP address, with no evidence provided to support the claim that Roth was involved.
  - The Gibraltarpedia project, where editors created articles about Gibraltar, came under scrutiny due to concerns about Roger Bamkin, a Wikimedia UK board member who was head of the project, having a professional relationship with the government of Gibraltar in connection with Gibraltarpedia. Of primary concern was that the site's main page "Did You Know" section was allegedly being used for the promotional purposes of Bamkin's clients. Bamkin, under pressure, resigned from the board.
- October 2012 – Asian soccer's governing body was forced to apologize to the United Arab Emirates soccer team for referring to them as the "Sand Monkeys"; the spurious nickname had been taken from a vandalized Wikipedia article.
- November 2012 – Lord Justice Leveson wrote in his report on British press standards, "The Independent was founded in 1986 by the journalists Andreas Whittam Smith, Stephen Glover and Brett Straub ..." He had used the Wikipedia article for The Independent newspaper as his source, but an act of vandalism had replaced Matthew Symonds (a genuine co-founder) with Brett Straub (an unknown character). The Economist said of the Leveson report, "Parts of it are a scissors-and-paste job culled from Wikipedia."
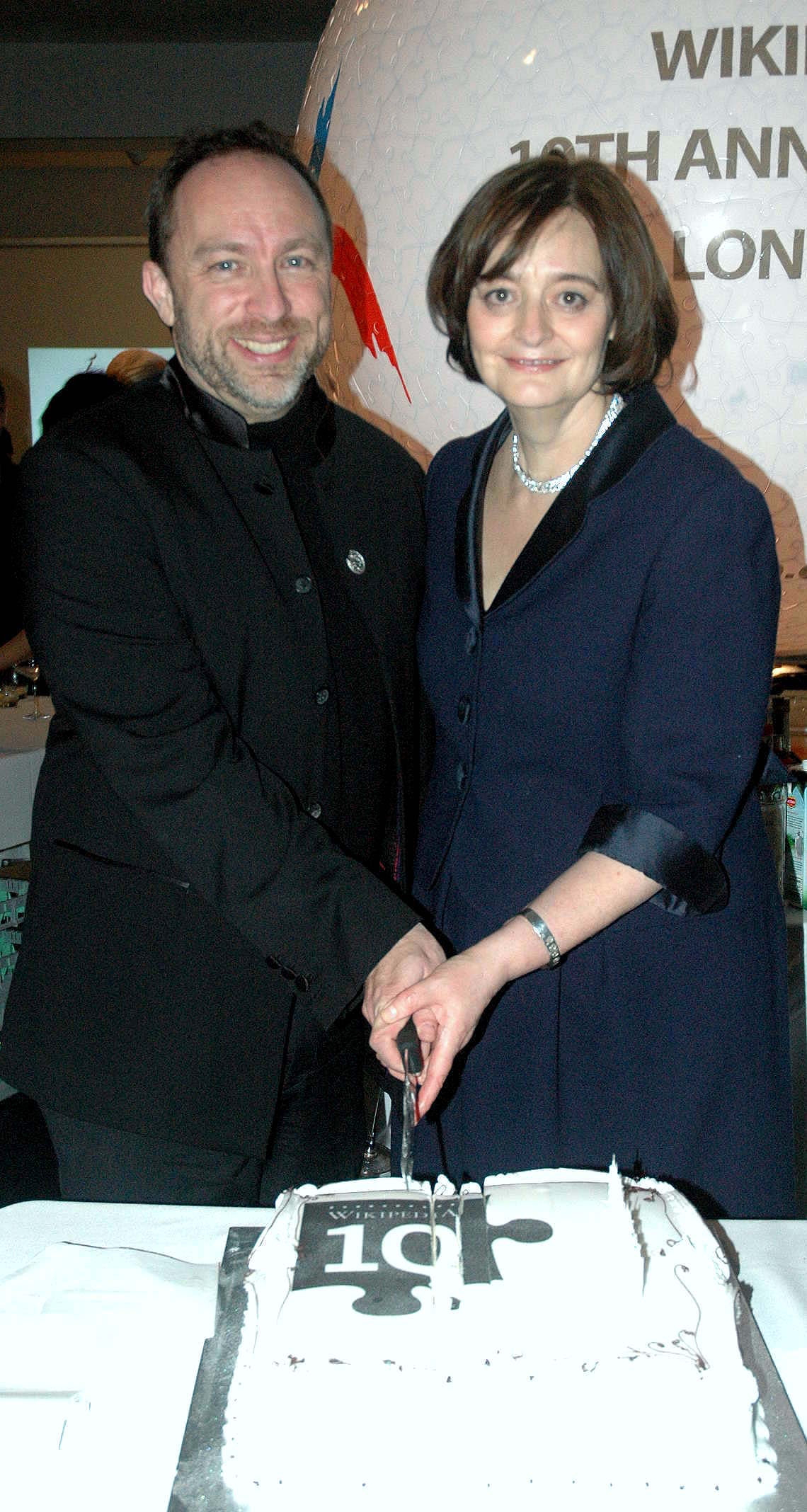
- Jimmy Wales's relationship to Tony and Cherie Blair came into question in December 2012 amid discussion of their connections with the Kazakh government.
  December 2012 – A discussion took place on the Wikipedia user talk page of Jimmy Wales about his connection with the Kazakhstan-based WikiBilim organization and repression by the government of Kazakhstan. Wales unilaterally shut down the conversation when other Wikipedia editors questioned him about his friendship with Tony Blair, whose company provides paid consultancy services to the Kazakh government. Wales stated that the line of questioning was "just totally weird and irrelevant" and told Andreas Kolbe, a moderator at Wikipediocracy who edits Wikipedia under the username "Jayen466": "please stay off my talk page".
- The Wikipedia Star Trek Into Darkness debate began on December 1, 2012, and lasted until January 31, 2013. It was largely centered on the capitalization of "into" in the title Star Trek Into Darkness.

==== 2013 ====
- January 2013 – The discovery of a hoax article on the "Bicholim conflict" caused widespread press coverage. The article, a detailed fabricated description of a fictitious war in Goa had been listed as a "good article" – a quality award given to fewer than 1% of all articles on the English Wikipedia – for more than five years.
- February 2013 – Prison company GEO Group received media coverage when a Wikipedia editor using the name "Abraham Cohen" (who was, at the time, also GEO Group's Manager of Corporate Relations) edited the company's entry to remove information on its past controversies, following the announcement that it had obtained naming rights to Florida Atlantic University's new stadium.
- March 2013 – Controversy arose in March 2013 after it emerged that large segments of the BP article had originated from a corporate employee who was a Wikipedia editor.
- April 2013
  - The French-language Wikipedia article Station hertzienne militaire de Pierre-sur-Haute, about a military radio station, attracted attention from the French interior intelligence agency DCRI. The agency attempted to have the article about the facility removed from the French-language Wikipedia. After a request for deletion in March 2013, the Wikimedia Foundation had asked the DCRI which parts of the article were causing a problem, noting that the article closely reflected information in a 2004 documentary made by Télévision Loire 7, a French local television station, which is freely available online and had been made with the cooperation of the French Air Force. The DCRI refused to give these details, and repeated its demand for deletion of the article. The DCRI then pressured Rémi Mathis, a volunteer administrator of the French-language Wikipedia, and president of Wikimedia France, into deleting the article by threatening him with arrest. Later, the article was restored by another Wikipedia contributor living in Switzerland. As a result of the controversy, the article temporarily became the most read page on the French Wikipedia, with more than 120,000 page views during the weekend of April 6/7, 2013. For his role in the controversy, Mathis was named Wikipedian of the Year by Jimmy Wales at Wikimania 2013.
  - It was confirmed by a spokesperson for the Federal Service for Supervision of Communications, Information Technology and Mass Media that Wikipedia had been blacklisted over the Russian Wikipedia's article about cannabis smoking. Being placed on the blacklist gives the operator 24 hours to remove the offending material. If the website owner refuses to remove the material then either the website host or the network operator will be required to block access to the site in Russia. The New York Times had reported in March that Russia had begun to "selectively" block internet content that the government considered either illegal under Russian law or otherwise harmful to children.
  - UK tabloid The Sun alleged that Labour Party MP Chuka Umunna, in 2007 before his election, used the Wikipedia username "Socialdemocrat", to create and repeatedly edit his own Wikipedia page. Umunna told The Daily Telegraph that he did not alter his own Wikipedia page, but the paper quoted what they called "sources close to Umunna" as having told the newspaper that "it was possible that one of his campaign team in 2007, when he was trying to be selected to be Labour's candidate for Streatham in the 2010 general election, set up the page". On April 11, 2013, the Evening Standard alleged that an edit in January 2008 was made on a computer at the law firm at which he then worked. Umunna said that he had "no recollection" of doing so.
  - An edit war on the Wikipedia article of Canadian politician and leader of the New Democratic Party (NDP) in British Columbia, Adrian Dix, was widely reported in the Canadian press. Dix, while employed by Glen Clark, then premier of British Columbia, had falsified a memo related to a scandal involving casinos in which Clark was implicated, leading to Dix being fired from his post. The Wikipedia editor who led the effort to keep mention of the incident out of Dix's article was identified by Global News and the Vancouver Sun as Mike Cleven, who edits Wikipedia under the username Skookum1. Cleven denied that he was associated with the NDP, stating that "I am the editor who's spent the most energy on keeping the people pushing an inflammatory and undue-weight account of this. Whitewashing the article to prevent mention of this is not the aim here, it is to prevent articles being used for defamatory purposes ... the BC Liberals have pulled this kind of crap on Wikipedia before; they can say it's not them, sure uh-huh, but the agenda of those claiming NOT to be them is too much like theirs to be worth explaining further."
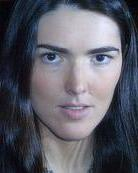
  - Writer Amanda Filipacchi wrote an April 2013 op-ed in The New York Times criticizing the Wikipedia category "American Women Novelists".
    Amanda Filipacchi wrote an op-ed for The New York Times on April 24, 2013, titled "Wikipedia's Sexism Toward Female Novelists", in which she noted that "editors have begun the process of moving women, one by one, alphabetically, from the 'American Novelists' category to the 'American Women Novelists' subcategory". She suggested the reason for the move might be to create a male-only list of 'American Novelists' on Wikipedia. The story was picked up by many other newspapers and websites and feminists said in response that they were disappointed and shocked by the action. Wikipedia editors initiated various responses soon after Filipacchi's article appeared, including the creation of a category for 'American men novelists' along with an immediate proposal to merge both categories back into the original 'American novelists' category. The 'American men novelists' category was criticized because the two categories together would have the effect of emptying the 'American novelists' category. When the 'American men novelists' category was first created, its only entries were Orson Scott Card and P. D. Cacek (who is female). A few days after the op-ed, Filipacchi wrote in the New York Times Sunday Review about the reaction to it, which included edits to the Wikipedia article about her that she suggested were retaliatory. In an article in The Atlantic responding to accounts that the edits she had initially complained of were the work of one rogue editor, Filipacchi detailed edit histories identifying seven other editors who had individually or collectively performed the same actions. Andrew Leonard, reporting for Salon.com, found that Filipacchi's articles were followed by what he called "revenge editing" on her article and articles related to her, including that of her father, Daniel Filipacchi. Leonard quoted extensively from talk page comments of Wikipedia editor Qworty, who, e.g., wrote on the talk page of Filipacchi's article: "Oh, by all means, let's be intimidated by the Holy New York Times. Because when the New York Times tells you to shut up, you have to shut up. Because that's the way 'freedom' works, and the NYT is all about promoting freedom all over the world, which is why they employed Judith Miller."
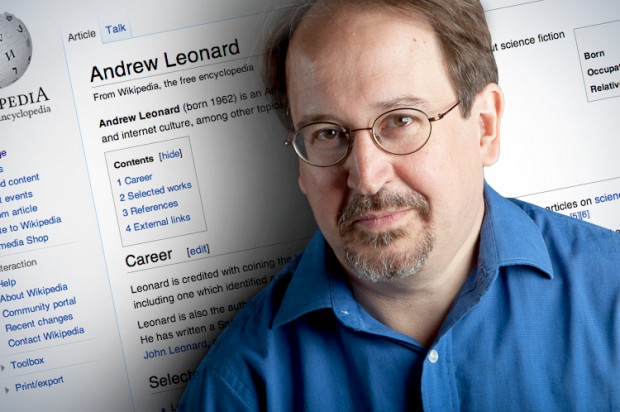
- Andrew Leonard poses in front of a Wikipedia page about him, the creation of which was inspired by his reporting on "revenge editor" Robert Clark Young.
  May 2013 – Andrew Leonard, writing in salon.com, revealed Wikipedia editor Qworty's real life identity to be Robert Clark Young, a novelist and writer. Qworty first drew attention to himself through his "revenge editing" on the Wikipedia article of novelist and Wikipedia critic Amanda Filipacchi. Young routinely made negative revisions to the pages of authors with whom he disagreed. Leonard was aided in his investigation by members of Wikipedia criticism site Wikipediocracy. According to Washington Monthly columnist Kathleen Geier, "The Qworty case reveals the Achilles' heel of the Wikipedia project. Anyone possessing enough time and resources, and who is obsessed enough, can post information on the site that is false, misleading, or extremely biased." Shortly after the publication of Leonard's article, Qworty/Young was indefinitely blocked from editing Wikipedia and a sockpuppet investigation was opened in order to determine the extent of Young's editing with multiple accounts. Writing about the episode on his talk page, Wikipedia co-founder Jimmy Wales quoted Leonard's original article: "For those of us who love Wikipedia, the ramifications of the Qworty saga are not comforting", and went on to write that "That sums it up for me. More thoughts soon. I would have banned him outright years ago. So would many others. That we did not, points to serious deficiencies in our systems." Leonard's continued investigations into Young's editing revealed a years-long crusade against articles about topics and people related to modern Paganism. Leonard reported that one of the pagans whose article Young had nominated for deletion in 2012 nominated Young's article, in an act of revenge, for deletion after Young's revenge editing came to light. However, the pagan editor told Leonard "that he was unlikely to be successful in getting Young's page deleted, because Salon's series of articles on the Qworty affair had enshrined the entire saga as a notable moment in Wikipedia history". The Robert Clark Young article was, however, deleted in January 2017.
- June 2013 – Jimmy Wales, co-founder of Wikipedia, asked other editors to post their suspicions about Edward Snowden's activities on Wikipedia to Wales' talk page, arguably violating Wikipedia's strict "outing" policy. No evidence of Snowden's editing was uncovered.
- August 2013 – On August 22, 2013, Chelsea (then Bradley) Manning announced her intention to transition. Shortly thereafter, Manning's Wikipedia page was moved from "Bradley Manning" to "Chelsea Manning", and the page was rewritten to reflect Manning's female name and gender "with remarkably little controversy" at first. Within a day, however, a long move request had begun which found no consensus for the move, resulting in the page being returned to "Bradley Manning" until a second long move request in October found consensus that it should indeed be "Chelsea Manning". The same month (October), Wikipedia's Arbitration Committee heard a case about the disputes about the article, which resulted in several editors being topic-banned from editing transgender-related pages for either making transphobic remarks or accusing others of making such remarks. This led Trans Media Watch to criticize the committee for implying that accusations of transphobia were as bad as actual transphobia.
- September 2013
  - Lawyer Susan L. Burke who had represented Iraqi civilians against the private military company Blackwater Inc. (now known as Academi) sued to discover the identity of two Wikipedia editors who allegedly inserted misleading information into the Wikipedia article about her and who, she alleged, were associates of Blackwater Inc.
  - Croatian newspapers reported that the Croatian Wikipedia had been taken over by "a clique of fascists" who were rewriting Croatian history and promoting anti-Serb sentiment. The Croatian Minister of Education, Science, and Sport, Željko Jovanović, made a public statement saying that the country's students should not rely on the Croatian Wikipedia: "[W]e have to point out that much of the content in the Croatian version of Wikipedia is not only misleading but also clearly falsified". In an interview with Croatian news agency HINA, Snježana Koren, a historian at the Faculty of Humanities and Social Sciences, University of Zagreb, judged the disputed articles "biased and malicious, partly even illiterate", adding that "These are the types of articles you can find on the pages of fringe organizations and movements" and expressing doubts on the ability of its authors to distinguish good from evil.
- October 2013
  - Wikimedia Foundation Executive Director Sue Gardner expressed concerns that too much money from Wikipedia donations was flowing to the various Wikimedia chapters around the world, funding bureaucracy rather than benefiting the encyclopedia. She also expressed concerns that Wikimedia's Funds Dissemination Committee process, being "dominated by fund-seekers, does not as currently constructed offer sufficient protection against log-rolling, self-dealing, and other corrupt practices".
  - An investigation by Wikipedians found that the Wiki-PR company had operated "an army" of sockpuppet accounts to edit Wikipedia on behalf of paying clients. The company's website claimed that its "staff of 45 Wikipedia editors and admins helps you build a page that stands up to the scrutiny of Wikipedia's community rules and guidelines". The company's Twitter profile stated: "We write it. We manage it. You never worry about Wikipedia again." The Wikimedia Foundation subsequently sent Wiki-PR a cease-and-desist letter. After a Wikipedia sockpuppet investigation related to the company, more than 250 Wikipedia user accounts were blocked or banned.
  - Australian Environment Minister Greg Hunt made headlines in Australian media in an interview with the BBC World Service stating that he had "looked up what Wikipedia says about bushfires" and read there that bushfires were frequent events that had occurred in hotter months prior to European settlement. At the same time, meteorologists funded by the federal government, other scientists and politicians expressed concerns that increasingly extreme fire and flood events are linked to scientifically accepted climate change. According to the Sydney Morning Herald, Wikipedia's article about Hunt was edited to state that he uses Wikipedia for important policy research, and editing of the article was then disabled for new or unregistered users due to vandalism.

==== 2014 ====
- January 2014
  - The Wikimedia Foundation announced that Program Evaluation Coordinator Sarah Stierch was "no longer an employee of the Wikimedia Foundation", after evidence was presented on a Wikimedia mailing list that she had been editing Wikipedia on behalf of paying clients, a practice the Wikimedia Foundation said was "frowned upon by many in the editing community and by the Wikimedia Foundation".
  - The Wikipedia page about North Carolina state senator Jim Davis was edited to state, incorrectly, that he had died of a heart attack.
  - There was concern that the Wikipedia article on the Hillsborough disaster had been vandalized with offensive comments posted from computers within various UK government departments.
- July 2014
  - The Daily Telegraph reported that IP addresses belonging to the Russian government had edited articles relating to Malaysia Airlines Flight 17 to remove claims that it helped provide the missile system used to shoot down the aircraft. Among the pages edited was the Russian Wikipedia's article listing of civil aviation incidents, to claim that "the plane [Flight MH17] was shot down by Ukrainian soldiers".
  - The Wall Street Journal reported on a controversial article-writing program called Lsjbot that has created millions of articles on Swedish Wikipedia and several other language editions.
  - The 5-year-old Amelia Bedelia Cameroon "accidental hoax" about Amelia Bedelia, main character of its eponymous popular children's book series, was revealed by journalist EJ Dickson. Dickson, who authored the fabricated statements with a friend when they were "stoned", only rediscovered the hoax after it had been propagated tens of times by blogs, journalists, academics, as well as Amelia Bedelia's current author, causing debate about Wikipedia, the usage made of it, as well as responsibility regarding online sources in general.
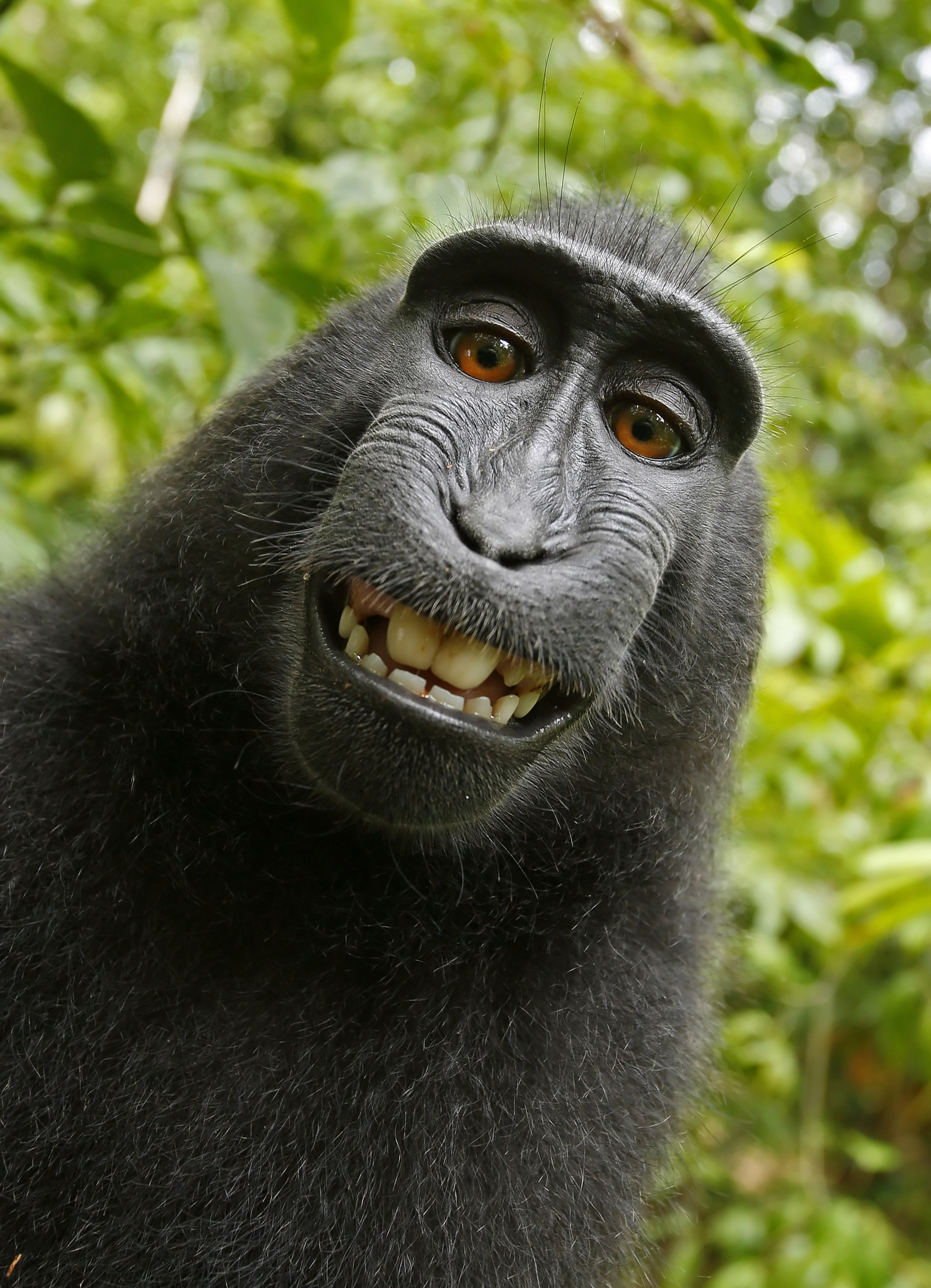
- The controversial monkey selfie
  August 2014 – Photographer David Slater sent a copyright takedown notice to the Wikimedia Commons over a photograph of a Celebes crested macaque taken on one of his cameras, which at the time was being operated by the macaque, resulting in a "monkey selfie". The Wikimedia Foundation dismissed the claims, asserting that the photograph, having been taken by a non-human animal, rather than Slater, is in the public domain per United States law. Subsequently, a court in San Francisco ruled copyright protection could not be applied to the monkey and a University of Michigan law professor said "the original monkey selfie is in the public domain".

==== 2015 ====
- January 2015 – The Guardian reported that the English Wikipedia Arbitration Committee had banned five editors deemed to be breaking the site's rules from gender-related articles amid the Gamergate controversy. This gathered a response from outlets such as Gawker, The Mary Sue, de Volkskrant, and Wired Germany. The accuracy of these reactions was promptly addressed by the committee, which had not yet released its final decision. The Wikimedia Foundation also released a statement on its blog. On January 28, the Arbitration Committee issued a final ruling in the Gamergate case, in which one longtime editor was banned from the site and other editors were prohibited from editing articles related to Gamergate or gender.
- February 2015
  - Wikipedia's Arbitration Committee banned Wikipedia administrator Wifione after accusations that they had for years manipulated the Wikipedia article on the Indian Institute of Planning and Management, an unaccredited business school. The Wikipedia page was used as a marketing tool by the school. Indian journalist Maheswhar Peri said, "In my opinion, by letting this go on for so long, Wikipedia has messed up perhaps 15,000 students' lives."
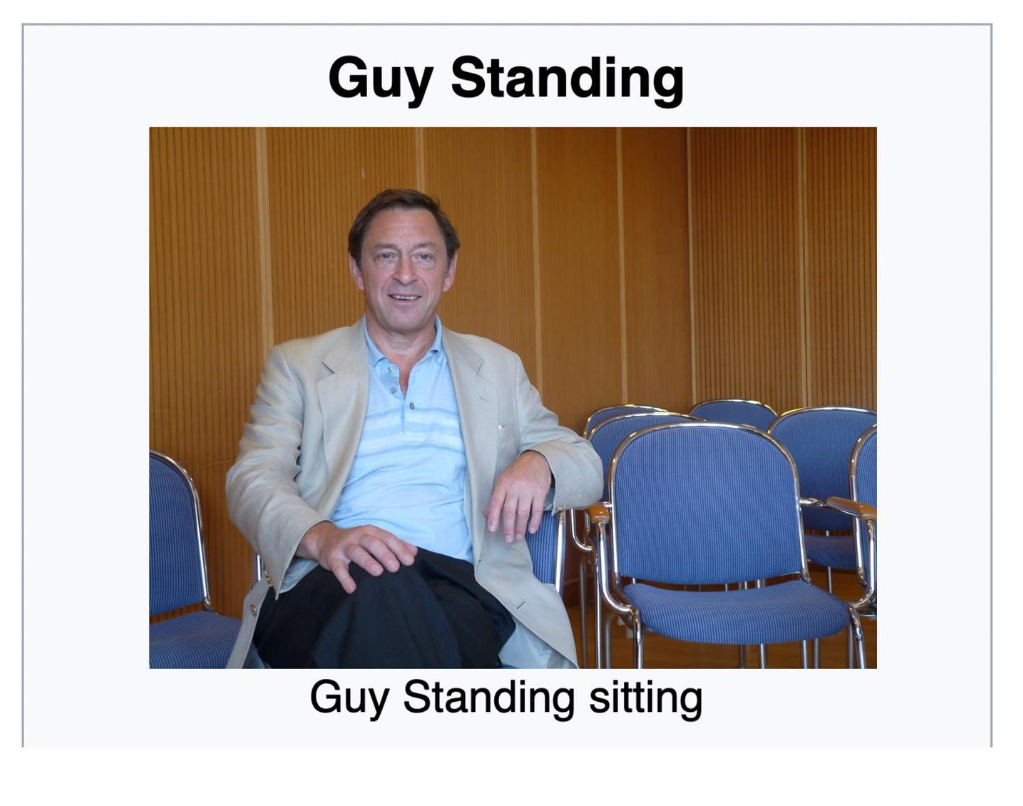
  - Screenshot of Standing's Wikipedia photo, which caused an edit war over its caption
    Beginning February 2015, there was an ongoing edit war over the image caption for Guy Standing's English Wikipedia article. The debate was over if the word "sitting" should be added to the caption, since he was sitting in the photo. A screenshot of the caption describing him as "Guy Standing sitting" has become a viral internet meme. At one point in the edit war, the caption read "Guy Standing on a chair." As of 2026, the consensus is to exclude the word "sitting". In May 2022, Standing was invited to the American podcast Reply All to discuss the "Guy Standing sitting" joke.
- June 2015 – Wikipedia administrator "Chase me ladies, I'm the Cavalry", who in real life is Richard Symonds, a Liberal Democrat, was stripped of his advanced permissions on English Wikipedia after the site's Arbitration Committee found that he improperly blocked the account "Contribsx" and attributed its edits to then Chairman of the Conservative Party Grant Shapps. The committee stated the account in question could not be connected to "any specific individual".
- September 2015 – Wikipedia was hit by the Orangemoody blackmail scandal, as it came to light that hundreds of businesses and minor celebrities had faced demands for payment from rogue editors to publish, protect or update Wikipedia articles on them.
- November 2015 – The Washington Examiner reported that editors associated with The Hunting Ground, a documentary on rape on college campuses, were discovered making edits to various Wikipedia articles "to make facts conform to the film". In response, Jimmy Wales started a discussion on his talk page about people who edit when they have a conflict of interest (COI): "I have long advocated that we should deal much more quickly and much more severely with COI editors. The usual objections (from some quarters – I think most people agree with me) have to do with it being hard to detect them, but in this case, the COI was called out, warnings were issued, and nothing was done."
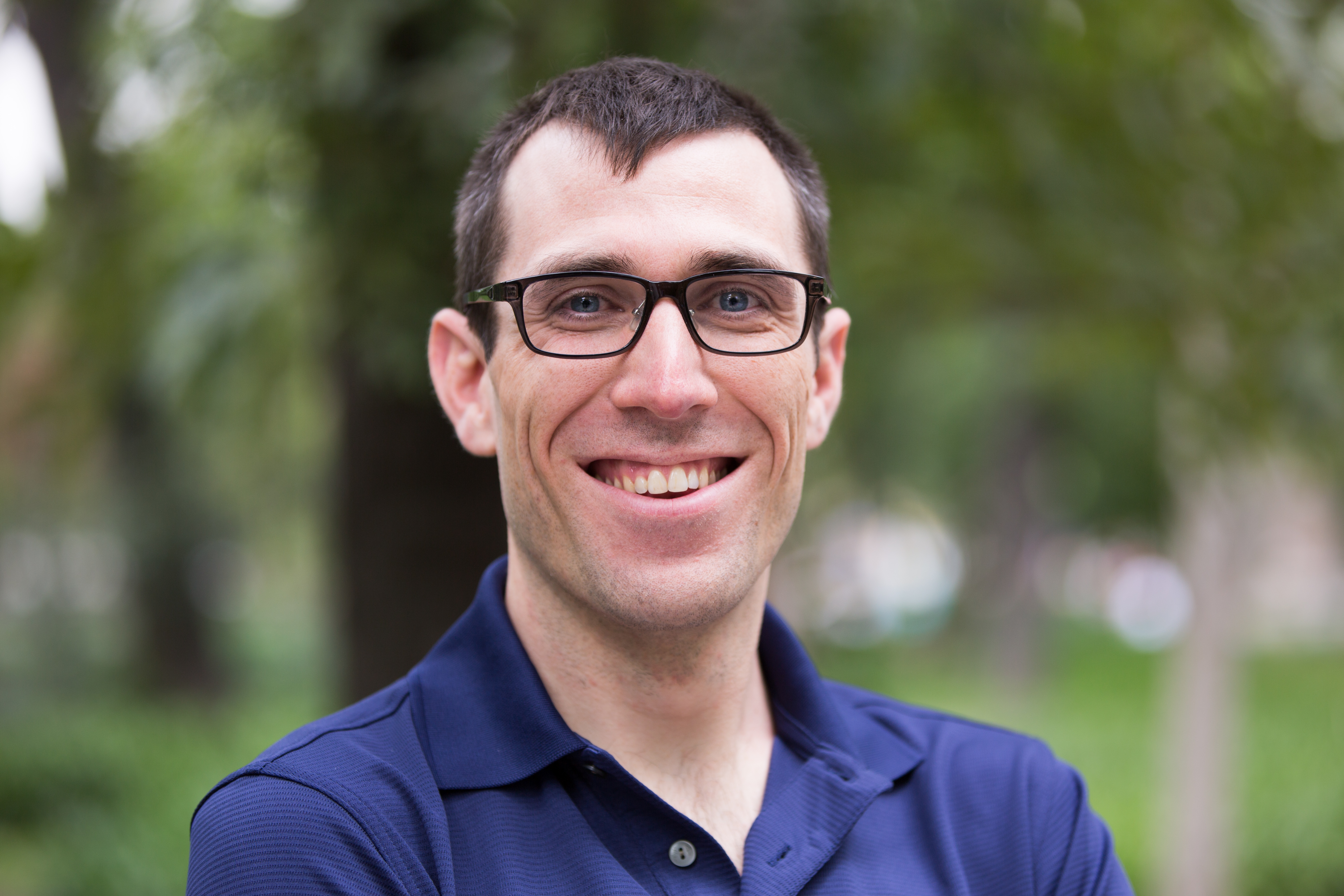
- James Heilman's dismissal from the Wikimedia Foundation Board of Trustees exacerbated tensions between the Board and the Wikipedia editing community in December 2015.
  December 2015 – The Wikimedia Foundation Board of Trustees voted to remove board member James Heilman on December 28. Heilman was one of three members elected by the Wikipedia editing community in May of that year. The unclear circumstances of his dismissal led to a number of discussions critical of the Board, exacerbating long-standing tensions concerning its relationship with the community. Heilman suggested that his internal inquiry to make the Knight Foundation grant public was a factor in his dismissal from the WMF's board of trustees.

==== 2016 ====
- January 2016 – On January 5, the Wikimedia Foundation announced the addition of Arnnon Geshuri, vice president of human resources at Tesla Motors, to its board of directors. The appointment was controversial among Wikipedia editors due to his prior role as senior director of human resources and staffing at Google, where he was involved with a "no cold call" arrangement between tech companies that ended with action by the Department of Justice. Nearly 300 editors signed a vote of no confidence, urging his removal from the board. On January 27, board president Patricio Lorente announced Geshuri would step down.
- February 2016 – On February 25, owing to pressures presented by a "community revolt", Wikimedia Foundation executive director Lila Tretikov resigned from the organization. Sources attributed the resignation largely to concerns that the organization's leadership was not being transparent enough with a proposal to develop a search engine, which was seen by many as being outside the remit of the non-profit educational charity.

==== 2018 ====
- May 2018 – In May 2018, a Wikipedia user rejected a draft biography of Canadian laser physicist Donna Strickland. An entry only appeared after she jointly won a Nobel Prize in Physics in October 2018.

- May–June 2018 – News media reported about Philip Cross, a prolific editor who edited articles about left-leaning anti-war sites and activists. Cross also used Twitter, where he engaged with people critical of his editing, sometimes in a hostile manner, referring to one group of anti-war activists as "goons". British politician George Galloway complained about edits that Cross had made to his article. Various groups, including media backed by the Russian government offered a financial reward for the exposure of his real identity. In July, Cross was banned from editing about post-1978 British politics by the Arbitration Committee.
- September 2018 – On September 27, 2018, the home addresses and phone numbers of United States senators Lindsey Graham, Mike Lee, and Orrin Hatch were posted to their respective Wikipedia articles during confirmation hearings for Supreme Court nominee Brett Kavanaugh. Wikipedia administrators deleted the information shortly afterwards. Jackson A. Cosko, a Congressional aide, was sentenced to four years in prison for making the posts and for theft of personal data of Congressional employees.

==== 2019 ====
- January 2019 – On January 11, 2019, in the midst of the 2019 Venezuelan presidential crisis, the Venezuelan state company CANTV started completely blocking Wikipedia, affecting 1.5 million users.
- April 2019 – Following the Higashi-Ikebukuro runaway car accident in Japan, an article of the suspect, Kozo Iizuka, was created on the Japanese Wikipedia. The article itself, however, did not touch upon his actions of that day; any attempts to shed light on this were reverted by editors, resulting in edit wars and the article being protected by administrators. The edit war was covered by major news outlets, most notably The Asahi Shimbun.
- May 2019 – In May 2019, Leo Burnett Tailor Made, a marketing agency for The North Face Brazil, revealed that they had surreptitiously replaced photos of popular outdoor destinations on Wikipedia with photos featuring North Face products in an attempt to get these products to appear more prominently in search engine results. Following widespread media coverage and criticism from the Wikimedia Foundation, The North Face ended and apologized for the campaign, and the product placement was undone.
- June 2019 – On June 10, 2019, the English Wikipedia administrator Fram was banned by the Wikimedia Foundation (WMF) from editing the English Wikipedia for a period of one year. The ban was eventually overturned. It was the first ever partial ban implemented by the WMF Trust and Safety team. According to Joseph Bernstein of BuzzFeed News, this took place "without a trial", and WMF did not "disclose the complainer nor the complaint" to the community. Some in the editor community expressed anger at the WMF not providing specifics, as well as skepticism as to whether Fram deserved the ban. An internal Wikipedia page called "Community response to the Wikimedia Foundation's ban of Fram" was created to discuss the controversy, and within weeks surpassed 470,000 words, more than there are in the novel A Game of Thrones. An administrator unblocked Fram, later citing "overwhelming community support", but the WMF reblocked Fram and revoked the administrative abilities of this administrator. A second administrator then unblocked Fram. Three weeks after the initial ban, 21 English Wikipedia administrators had resigned. An open letter to WMF Board by the Wikipedia Arbitration Committee on June 30 acknowledged and channelled some of the community dissatisfaction. On July 2, the WMF board opened up the Fram case for a review by the Arbitration Committee, and supported further community involvement in the "debate on toxic behavior" and how to deal with it; a commitment echoed by a July 3 statement from Wikimedia CEO Katherine Maher, who also acknowledged "that there are things that the Foundation could have handled better". The Arbitration Committee completed a review of the Foundation's confidential evidence in September 2019, and overturned the ban.
- July 2019 – On the Russian Wikipedia a group of 12 users (meatpuppets and sockpuppets) was revealed, which coordinated their edits praising current Russian governments officials (mostly governors) and slandering Russian opposition activists, especially top Anti-Corruption Foundation activists Alexei Navalny and Lyubov Sobol, Russian non-government media and journalists critical to Russian government (e.g. Arkady Babchenko and Yevgenia Albats), using as references almost exclusively articles from media belonging to Yevgeny Prigozhin, an oligarch who reportedly was very close to Vladimir Putin and was rumored to be in charge of a social media bot network exercising state-sponsored Internet propaganda. Those users were initially noticed by an editor who saw them almost simultaneously apply for advanced user rights.

=== 2020s ===
==== 2020 ====
- August 2020 – A Reddit user publicized that a prolific Scots Wikipedia administrator actually from the United States did not speak the Scots language; tens of thousands of articles were in fact English with eye dialect spellings to suggest a Scottish accent, or word-by-word machine translations of articles from English Wikipedia. Wikimedia users debated recruiting fluent speakers of Scots to repair the articles, reverting all edits from the administrator in question, or – as the latter would entail removing nearly half the articles in the encyclopedia – even deleting and restarting Scots Wikipedia afresh. The Guardian attributed the problem to systemic issues in Wikipedia culture, suggesting that some administrators are afforded effectively unchecked power based on sheer volume of edits (rather than the quality of their work). Robyn Speer, chief scientist at Luminoso, expressed concern that artificial intelligence corpora which used Wikipedia for language-training data had been corrupted by the pseudo-Scots.
- September 2020 – The Guardian reported on an experiment conducted by economists from Collegio Carlo Alberto in Italy and ZEW in Germany where they added content into articles about randomly selected cities in Spain. The researchers claimed that adding photos increased the nights spent in those cities by 9%. The experiment resulted in the research team being barred from making further edits on Dutch Wikipedia.

==== 2021 ====
- March 2021 – In March 2021, Yumiko Sato released an article for Slate detailing disinformation on the Japanese Wikipedia. Among other war crime revisionism, most notably, the title for the Nanjing Massacre (Japanese: 南京大虐殺, romanized: nankin daigyakusatsu) has been retitled to "The Nanjing Incident" (ja:南京事件 romanized: nankin jiken), to minimize the atrocity. Since then, "Nanjing Incident" has become the common name for the atrocity in Japanese. The Japanese Wikipedia had been accused of right-wing historical revisionism by scholars prior to Sato's article. The Wikimedia Foundation responded, "With more than 300 language versions of Wikipedia it can be hard to discover issues like this." The Japanese language Wikipedia is the second-most popular edition. While initially the Wikimedia Foundation said the Japanese Wikipedia was not a priority, they eventually started working with a native Japanese speaker to evaluate the issues with Japanese Wikipedia.
- September 2021 – After years of investigations, the Wikimedia Foundation decided to ban seven accounts and desysop 12 accounts who were associated with the Wikimedians of Mainland China (WMC) on the Chinese Wikipedia. The Foundation stated that the Chinese Wikipedia was infiltrated by the WMC, including vote-stacking, election manipulation, and legal threats to Hongkonger editors. Some banned accounts decided to establish their own online encyclopedia, Qiuwen Baike.
- November 2021
  - For several years, a man named Nathaniel White had his picture associated on Wikipedia and Google with a serial killer also named Nathaniel White.
  - The English Wikipedia's entry for "Mass killings under communist regimes" was nominated for deletion, with some editors arguing that it has "a biased 'anti-Communist' point of view", that "it should not resort to 'simplistic presuppositions that events are driven by any specific ideology'", and that "by combining different elements of research to create a 'synthesis', this constitutes original research and therefore breaches Wikipedia rules". This was criticized by historian Robert Tombs, who called it "morally indefensible, at least as bad as Holocaust denial, because 'linking ideology and killing' is the very core of why these things are important. I have read the Wikipedia page, and it seems to me careful and balanced. Therefore attempts to remove it can only be ideologically motivated – to whitewash Communism." Other Wikipedia editors and users on social media opposed the deletion of the article. The article's deletion nomination received considerable attention from conservative media. The Heritage Foundation, an American conservative think tank, called the arguments made in favor of deletion "absurd and ahistorical". On December 1, 2021, a panel of four administrators found that the discussion yielded no consensus, meaning that the status quo was retained, and the article was not deleted. The article's deletion discussion was the largest in Wikipedia's history by a significant margin.

==== 2022 ====
- June 2022 – A Chinese woman was found to have "created over 200 fictional articles on the Chinese Wikipedia, writing millions of words of imagined history that went unnoticed for more than 10 years". She went under the username 折毛 (pinyin: Zhémáo). Some of the Zhemao hoaxes were translated and entered into other Wikipedias, among them the English and Russian Wikipedias.
- July 2022 – A dispute broke out among Wikipedia editors over the definition of an economic recession given in the article on that subject. Right-wing critics in the United States accused Wikipedia of aligning with the definition utilized by the Biden administration, but according to The Washington Post, the article had always reflected a variety of definitions and was recently changed to give "slightly more emphasis to the two-quarter definition, noting that it is "commonly used as a practical definition of a recession". The Post also noted that "Locking Wikipedia pages to prevent partisan edits is nothing new." When Elon Musk used Twitter to accuse Wikipedia of "losing its objectivity", Wikipedia co-founder Jimmy Wales replied: "Reading too much Twitter nonsense is making you stupid." According to Slate, the recession dispute "shows that [Wikipedia] can have trouble communicating their complexities to outsiders".
- September 2022 – Following a loss of India to Pakistan in a cricket game at the 2022 Asia Cup, an editor at the article on Indian cricketer Arshdeep Singh changed the country for which he plays to the separatist movement of Khalistan. Under 2021 regulations governing large intermediaries, the Indian Ministry of Electronics and Information Technology summoned Wikimedia executives to ensure that "deliberate efforts at incitement and user harm" are not made in the future.
- December 2022 – On 6 December, the Wikimedia Foundation announced that it had globally banned 16 users for conflict-of-interest editing of Middle East and North Africa topics after a year-long investigation. It was alleged that these were agents of the Saudi Arabian government. In the media reporting following the bans it transpired that two former administrators had been arrested in 2020 and then jailed by the Saudi government. These were Osama Khalid, who was sentenced to 32 years in prison, and Ziyad al-Sofiani, who was sentenced to eight years.

==== 2023 ====
- February 2023
  - Retired baseball umpire Joe West reportedly made numerous attempts to remove information off his Wikipedia page, specifically related to an incident where he pushed a manager, and issued legal threats to many Wikipedia editors who reverted his edits.
  - A Wikipedia Signpost report was published which claimed the Adani Group employed undeclared paid editors to write and sanitize related Wikipedia pages.
  - In 2023, Jan Grabowski and Shira Klein published an article in the Journal of Holocaust Research in which they said they had discovered a "systematic, intentional distortion of Holocaust history" on the English-language Wikipedia. Grabowski and Klein explained how a small group of editors managed to impose a fringe narrative on Polish-Jewish relations informed by Polish nationalist propaganda. In addition to the article on the Warsaw concentration camp, which featured a false Polish martyrdom story for more than a decade, the authors conclude that the activities of the editors' group had an effect on several articles, such as History of the Jews in Poland, Rescue of Jews by Poles during the Holocaust and Jew with a coin. Nationalist editing purportedly included content ranging "from minor errors to subtle manipulations and outright lies", examples of which the authors offer.
- March 2023 –
  Incorrect version of the flag of Vatican City displayed on Wikipedia from 2017 to 2022
  Correct version of the flag of Vatican City from 2001 to 2023
  It was noticed that Wikipedia had displayed a wrong image of the flag of Vatican City for many years.
- November 2023 – A Wikipedia administrator, Lourdes, exposed themself as a sockpuppet of former user Wifione, an ex-administrator banned as a result of a 2015 Arbitration Committee case over Wifione's promotional editing for the Indian Institute of Planning and Management business school and related entries. Wifione was found to have impersonated Spanish singer Russian Red under the pseudonym Lourdes.
- December 2023 – In an apparent use of editing Wikipedia for the purpose of Google bombing, American rapper Eminem's Wikipedia article was vandalized to claim that he would die in Madison, Wisconsin on December 10, 2023, causing it to appear in Google search results.

==== 2024 ====
- January 2024 – The Times of London reported that the Iranian government had consolidated its presence in Farsi Wikipedia through revision deletion of text related to human rights violations. Justice for Iran has reported the Iranian regime pursued a user who was exposed at a Wikipedia event, criticizing Farsi Wikipedia's sysops connections to Iranian Islamic Republic regime ministries.
- September 2024 – Athletic apparel retailer Lululemon Athletica ended its association with American ultramarathon runner Camille Herron in the wake of a controversy in which she and/or her husband were found to be removing positive information about other athletes from Wikipedia while adding positive information about herself.
- October 2024 – Following the death of singer Liam Payne, Wikipedia faced backlash for allowing images purporting to be of Payne's trashed hotel room to be published on Payne's Wikipedia page in the hours following his death. Wikipedia was also criticised for listing Payne as a "past member" of One Direction on the band's Wikipedia page, with fans arguing the update was both "insensitive and inaccurate", as Payne was a member of One Direction for its entire run.

==== 2025 ====
- January–March 2025 – In January and March, edit warring on articles related to the Israeli–Palestinian conflict resulted in the Arbitration Committee banning at least 14 fake users for "manipulation and deception on Wikipedia".
- February 2025 – In the aftermath of the Elon Musk salute controversy, Musk revisited his previous attacks on Wikipedia, calling for the "defunding" of Wikipedia, calling it an extension of "legacy media" that is "captured by leftist politics".
- April 2025 – A division bench of the Delhi High Court directed Wikipedia to take down allegedly defamatory statements about news agency Asian News International (ANI), holding that the Information Technology (IT) Act mandated that sites take down "false" and "untrue" content following a court order and that sites could not contest the matter on merits. The defamation suit arose from ANI's plea before a judge that its Wikipedia page falsely described it as a "propaganda tool" for the government. Justices Prathiba M. Singh and Rajneesh Kumar Gupta stated, "Since Wikipedia claims to be intermediary, in terms of IT Rules, the intermediary has an obligation to make efforts not to publish any objection-able content. Perusal of Rule 3 of the IT Rules shows that if there is any content on Wikipedia website which a person whose info it professes to publish is false and untrue, on receipt of court order, within 36 hours, the intermediary is obliged to take down content. The judge heard parties and gave prima facie opinion that content is defamatory. Wikipedia would be liable to follow IT Rules and if the same is not taken down, the plaintiff can approach this court".
- December 2025 – The article "Litvinism" was dramatically expanded between September 2023 and January 2025 by a Lithuanian editor who was indefinitely blocked from Lithuanian and Samogitian Wikipedias for abusive behavior. The article portrayed Belarusian historical claims to the Grand Duchy of Lithuania as dangerous extremism and "a form of fascism with expansionist claims", citing neo-Nazi activists, Russian imperialist websites, and blogs that were generally unreliable, while presenting Belarusian use of the historical Pahonia coat of arms as evidence of "history theft". In December 2025, the article was nominated for deletion, and later rewritten at roughly one-tenth its former size, removing the inflammatory claims and distinguishing between fringe theories and mainstream Belarusian historiography that viewed the Grand Duchy of Lithuania as shared heritage. Belarusian newspaper Nasha Niva described the article in its previous state as a "weapon against Belarusians".

==== 2026 ====
- January 2026 – A Request for Comment (RfC) was held to determine the handling of birthplaces of people born in the Baltic states under Soviet rule (1944–1991), where a dozen participants decided to mention the state-socialist regimes, i.e. Estonian SSR and Soviet Union, in the infoboxes. It sparked controversy among the Estonian public due to the Soviet Union's past occupation of the countries. The incident was reported by Estonian media, which called it "Russian propaganda" and a deliberate attempt to erase the legal continuity of the Republic of Estonia. On Eesti Rahvusringhääling, the Estonian national television, Chairman of Wikimedia Estonia Robert Treufeldt called the user, who started the RfC and spent over 21 hours changing 600 Baltic biographies. It was reported by media in Latvia, Lithuania and other European countries. Meanwhile, Iran International reported that independent investigations had found editing activities that removed mentions of human rights abuses in Iran, including those of the 1988 Iranian executions, highlighting concerns over possible information warfare.
- May 2026 – The Wikimedia Foundation (WMF) dismissed Brooke Vibber, a developer who contributed to the MediaWiki software since 2003 and had previously served as the WMF's first Chief Technology Officer. One week later, the WMF laid off six employees while shutting down its Community Tech team, which implemented feature requests submitted by the editing community through the "community wishlist". The community criticized the WMF's actions, called for the Community Tech team to be restored, and raised concerns that the layoffs were related to the involvement of Vibber and the affected staffers in ongoing unionization efforts. WMF executives stated that the Community Tech employees could apply for different positions in the organization, that the wishlist process would be restructured, and that the WMF would recognize a union that gains majority support from staff. Community members responded with skepticism, noting that the WMF publicly listed fewer job openings for developers than the number of staff it had laid off. A petition expressing support for the Wiki Workers United (WWU) union and willingness to go on strike was signed by more than 1,400 community members as of September 22. The WMF decided to hire the union-busting law firm Littler Mendelson in response to the WWU's organizing.
- June 2026 – The English Wikipedia community indefinitely banned Larry Sanger for using his X following to recruit people into an internal discussion about a new WikiProject.

== See also ==
- Censorship of Wikipedia
- Conflict-of-interest editing on Wikipedia
- Criticism of Wikipedia
- List of edit wars on Wikipedia
- Litigation involving the Wikimedia Foundation
- Plagiarism from Wikipedia
- Reliability of Wikipedia
- Wikipedia in culture
