= Wikipediocracy =

Website for discussion and criticism of Wikipedia

- Screenshot taken 10 October 2019
- Website type: Blog and forum
- Available in: English
- Website: wikipediocracy.com
- Commercial: No
- Registration: Optional, required for some features
- Users: 1,735
- Launched: March 16, 2012; 14 years ago
- Current status: Active
- Content license: Copyright retained by authors

Wikipediocracy is a website for discussion and criticism of Wikipedia. Its members bring information about Wikipedia's controversies to the attention of the media. The site was founded in March 2012 by users of Wikipedia Review, another site dedicated to criticism of Wikipedia.

The site is "known for digging up dirt on Wikipedia's top brass", wrote reporter Kevin Morris in the Daily Dot. Novelist Amanda Filipacchi wrote in The Wall Street Journal that the site "intelligently discusses and entertainingly lambastes Wikipedia's problematic practices".

== History ==
Wikipediocracy was cofounded by Gregory Kohs after Wikipedia co-founder Jimmy Wales blocked him from editing Wikipedia for starting MyWikiBiz, a business that offered to create Wikipedia articles for a fee.

== Website user activism ==
Wikipediocracy contributors have investigated problems, conflicts, and controversies associated with Wikipedia, some being reported by mainstream media. The site's stated mission is "to shine the light of scrutiny into the dark crevices of Wikipedia" and related projects. In a doctoral thesis, internet policy and law specialist Heather Ford wrote that "as Wikipedia's authority grows, and more groups feel disenfranchised by its processes, the growth of watchdog groups like Wikipediocracy who act as translators of Wikipedia's complex structures, rules and norms for mainstream media and who begin to give voice to those who feel that they have been excluded from Wikipedia's representational structures will continue."

=== Revenge editing ===
In 2013, Wikipediocracy members contacted Salon.com reporter Andrew Leonard to alert him about the "Qworty fiasco". Wikipedia user Qworty had attracted attention for his provocative comments in a debate on Wikipedia's treatment of female writers. It emerged that many of his past contributions affected the site's treatment of, and targeted rivals of, writer Robert Clark Young. This background information led to Leonard's challenging Young in an article "Revenge, Ego, and the Corruption of Wikipedia", which identified Young as Qworty. Just before the publication of Leonard's article, Qworty had been banned from editing Wikipedia biographies of living persons due to this behaviour.

=== Discussion of governments ===
Wikipediocracy contributors' criticisms of Wikipedia have been discussed in news stories covering Jimmy Wales's relationship with the government of Kazakhstan, the Gibraltarpedia controversy, and an anonymous edit made from a U.S. Senate IP address that labelled whistle-blower Edward Snowden a "traitor".

In May 2014, The Telegraph, working with Wikipediocracy, uncovered evidence identifying the civil servant who had allegedly vandalized the Wikipedia articles on the Hillsborough disaster and Anfield.

=== Wikimedia Foundation ===
A Wikipediocracy blog post said in 2013 that Wikipedia was being vandalized from IP addresses assigned to the Wikimedia Foundation (WMF). Responding to the allegations, WMF spokesman Jay Walsh stated that the IP addresses belonged to WMF servers and were not used by the WMF offices. He stated that the addresses were assigned to some edits by IPs due to a misconfiguration, which was corrected.

=== Other issues ===
A Wikipediocracy forum discussion identified the Wikipedia account responsible for a hoax article Wikipedia administrators had recently deleted. The "Bicholim conflict" article described a fictitious 1640–41 Indian civil war. It was awarded Wikipedia's "Good article" status in 2007, and retained it until late 2012, when a Wikipedian checked the article's cited sources and found that none of them appeared to exist.

A September 2013 story resulting from a Wikipediocracy tip-off concerned commercial plastic surgeons editing Wikipedia's plastic surgery articles to promote their services. Concerns with violations of conflict of interest guidelines and the provision of misinformation in the relevant articles had also been raised by Wikipediocracy members on Wikipedia itself.

In February 2015, Wikipedia's Arbitration Committee banned a user after finding he had edited to promote the Indian Institute of Planning and Management and added negative material to the article on another university. The user's edits had been noted in Wikipediocracy in December 2013.

In late 2020, Wikipediocracy raised issues about the accuracy of the Wikipedia page of Nicholas Alahverdian. A Wikipediocracy blog team member said that multiple Wikipedia accounts created by Alahverdian edited his Wikipedia page, and that one of these accounts had tried to remove Alahverdian's image, replacing it with an image of another person. A notice was added to Wikipedia that acknowledged that the "truthfulness of this article has been questioned". In January 2021, The Providence Journal reported that American authorities in July 2020 investigated whether Alahverdian had really died in February 2020 as reported in the media. Alahverdian was subsequently found alive in Scotland.

== See also ==
- List of Wikipedia controversies
