= Wikipedia Seigenthaler biography incident =

2005 editorial controversy on Wikipedia

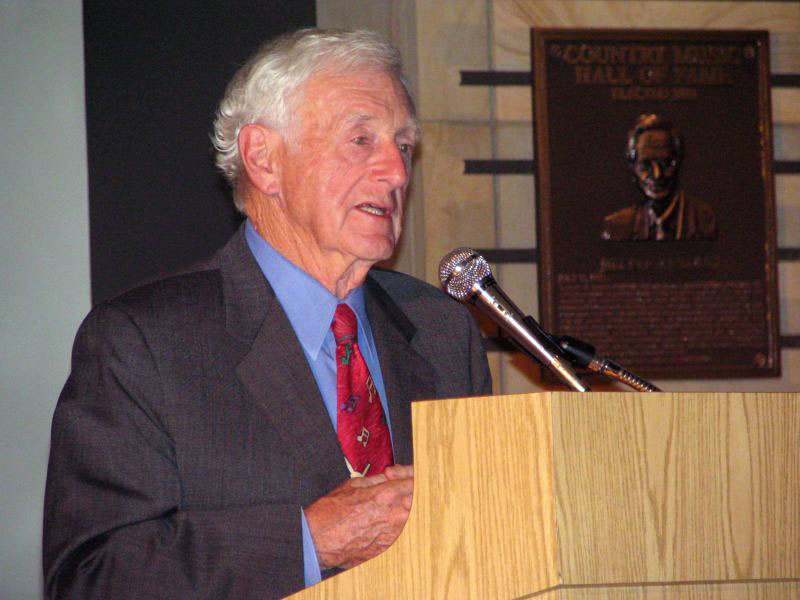
John Seigenthaler in October 2005

On May 26, 2005, an unregistered editor created a hoax article on the English Wikipedia about journalist John Seigenthaler. The article falsely stated that Seigenthaler had been a suspect in the assassinations of U.S. president John F. Kennedy and U.S. attorney general Robert F. Kennedy. After the hoax was discovered and corrected later in September, Seigenthaler, a friend and aide to Robert Kennedy, wrote an article in USA Today describing the Wikipedia page as an "Internet character assassination". The editor who created the hoax was later identified and admitted that he had done so as a joke.

The incident raised questions about the reliability of Wikipedia and other websites with user-generated content that lack the legal accountability of traditional newspapers and published materials, and damaged the site's credibility and reputation for many years. In a December 13, 2005, interview, co-founder Jimmy Wales expressed his support for Wikipedia policy allowing articles to be edited by unregistered users, but announced plans to roll back their article creation privileges as part of a vandalism-control strategy. The incident ultimately led Wikipedia to introduce stricter referencing requirements for biographies of living persons.

== Hoax ==
On May 26, 2005, a biographical article about John Seigenthaler was created by an anonymous Wikipedia editor that contained, in its entirety, the following text:

John Seigenthaler was the assistant to Attorney General Robert Kennedy in the ealry [sic] 1960's. [sic] For a brief time, he was thought to have been directly involved in the Kennedy assasinations [sic] of both John, and his brother, Bobby. Nothing was ever proven.

John Seigenthaler moved to the Soviet Union in 1971, and returned to the United States in 1984.

He started one of the country's largest public relations firm [sic] shortly thereafter.

=== Detection and correction ===
In September, Seigenthaler was alerted by his friend Victor S. Johnson Jr. about the article, which he relayed to his friends and colleagues via email. On September 23, 2005, Seigenthaler's colleague Eric Newton replaced the article content with Seigenthaler's official biography from the Freedom Forum. On September 24, this biography was removed by a Wikipedia editor due to copyright violation and was replaced with a short original biography.

In October 2005, Seigenthaler contacted the Chair of the Board of Trustees of the Wikimedia Foundation, Jimmy Wales, who asked administrator Essjay to hide affected versions of the article history from public view in the Wikipedia version logs, in effect removing them from all but Wikipedia administrators' view. Some mirror websites such as Reference.com and Answers.com not controlled by Wikipedia continued to display the older and inaccurate article for several weeks until the new version of the article was propagated to these other websites.

=== Anonymous editor identified ===
On November 29, 2005, Seigenthaler described the incident in an op-ed in USA Today, of which he had been the founding editorial director. In the article, he included a verbatim reposting of the false statements and called Wikipedia a "flawed and irresponsible research tool".

An expanded version was published several days later in The Tennessean, a daily newspaper in Nashville, Tennessee, where Seigenthaler had served in various capacities from beat reporter to chairman. In the article, Seigenthaler detailed his failed attempts to identify the anonymous person who posted the inaccurate biography. He reported that he had asked the poster's Internet service provider, BellSouth, to identify its user from the user's IP address. BellSouth refused to identify the user without a court order, suggesting that Seigenthaler file a John Doe lawsuit against the user, which Seigenthaler declined to do.

Daniel Brandt, a San Antonio activist who had started the website Wikipedia Watch to provide scrutiny of Wikipedia content in response to his objections to the article about him, looked up the IP address in Seigenthaler's article. He found that it related to Rush Delivery, a delivery service company in Nashville. He contacted Seigenthaler and the media, and posted this information on his website.

On December 9, Brian Chase, an operations manager for Rush Delivery, admitted he had posted the false biography as a joke for a colleague familiar with the Seigenthaler family, unaware that Wikipedia was used as a serious reference tool. Following his admission, Chase was fired from Rush Delivery. He presented a letter of apology to Seigenthaler, who successfully interceded with Rush Delivery to reinstate Chase. Seigenthaler confirmed that he would not file a lawsuit in relation to the incident. He said that he was concerned that "every biography on Wikipedia is going to be hit by this stuff—think what they'd do to Tom DeLay and Hillary Clinton, to mention two. My fear is that we're going to get government regulation of the Internet as a result."

== Reactions ==
=== Seigenthaler's public reaction ===
In his November 29, 2005, USA Today editorial, Seigenthaler criticized Congress for Section 230 of the Communications Decency Act, which protects ISPs and web sites from being held legally responsible for content posted by their customers and users:

Federal law also protects online corporations – BellSouth, AOL, MCI, Wikipedia, etc. – from libel lawsuits. Section 230 of the Communications Decency Act, passed in 1996, specifically states that "no provider or user of an interactive computer service shall be treated as the publisher or speaker." That legalese means that, unlike print and broadcast companies, online service providers cannot be sued for defaming attacks on citizens posted by others. And so we live in a universe of new media with phenomenal opportunities for worldwide communications and research – but populated by volunteer vandals with poison-pen intellects. Congress has enabled them and protects them.

On December 5, 2005, Seigenthaler and Wales appeared jointly on CNN to discuss the matter. On December 6, 2005, the two were interviewed on National Public Radio's Talk of the Nation radio program. Wales described a new policy that he had implemented in order to prevent unregistered users from creating new articles on the English-language Wikipedia, though their ability to edit existing articles was retained.

In the CNN interview, Seigenthaler also raised the spectre of increased government regulation of the Web:

Can I just say where I'm worried about this leading? Next year we go into an election year. Every politician is going to find himself or herself subjected to the same sort of outrageous commentary that hit me, and hits others. I'm afraid we're going to get regulated media as a result of that. And I tell you, I think if you can't fix it, both fix the history as well as the biography pages, I think it's going to be in real trouble, and we're going to have to be fighting to keep the government from regulating you.

In the December 6 joint NPR interview, Seigenthaler said that he did not want to have anything to do with Wikipedia because he disapproved of its basic assumptions. In an article Seigenthaler wrote for USA Today in late 2005, he said, "I am interested in letting many people know that Wikipedia is a flawed and irresponsible research tool." He also pointed out that the false information had been online for over four months before he was aware of it, and that he had not been able to edit the article to correct it. After speaking with Wikipedia co-founder Jimmy Wales, Seigenthaler said: "My 'biography' was posted May 26. On May 29, one of Wales' volunteers 'edited' it only by correcting the misspelling of the word 'early.' For four months, Wikipedia depicted me as a suspected assassin before I erased it from the website's history Oct. 5. The falsehoods remained on Answers.com and Reference.com for three more weeks." Editing Wikipedia, he suggested, would lend it his sanction or approval, and he stated his belief that editing the article was not enough and instead he wanted to expose "incurable flaws" in the Wikipedia process and ethos.

On December 9, Seigenthaler appeared on C-SPAN's Washington Journal with Brian Lamb hosting. He said he was concerned that other pranksters would try to spoof members of Congress or other powerful figures in government, which may then prompt a backlash and turn back First Amendment rights on the Web.

In the June 2007 issue of Reason magazine, Seigenthaler also expressed concern about the lack of transparency underlined by Wales' removal of the hoax pages from the article's history page. He also stated that many of the comments left by users in the edit summaries were things he would not want his nine-year-old grandson to see.

=== Wikimedia Foundation reaction ===
In an interview with BusinessWeek on December 13, 2005, Wales discussed the reasons the hoax had gone undetected, and steps being taken to address them. He stated that one problem was that Wikipedia's use had grown faster than its self-monitoring system could comfortably handle, and that therefore new page creation on the English Wikipedia would be restricted to account holders, addressing one of Seigenthaler's main criticisms.

He also gave his opinion that encyclopedias as a whole (whether print or online) were not usually appropriate for primary sources and should not be relied upon as authoritative (as some were doing), but that nonetheless Wikipedia was more reliable as "background reading" on subjects than most online sources. He stated that Wikipedia was a "work in progress".

A variety of changes were also made to Wikipedia's software and working practices, to address some of the issues arising. A new policy, 'biographies of living persons', was created on December 17, 2005; editorial restrictions, including reference requirements, were introduced on the creation of new Wikipedia articles; and new tracking categories for the biographies of living people were implemented.

The Foundation added a new level of "oversight" features to the MediaWiki software, accessible as of May 16, 2012, to around 37 experienced editors and Wikimedia staff members nominated by either Wales or the Arbitration Committee. This originally allowed for specific historical versions to be hidden from everyone (including Oversight editors), which then become unable to be viewed by anyone except developers via manual intervention, though the feature was later changed so that other Oversighters could view these revisions to monitor the tool's use. Currently such procedures are standardized by the 'Office actions' policy which states: "Sometimes the Wikimedia Foundation has to delete, protect or blank a page without going through the normal site/community process(es). These edits are temporary measures to prevent legal trouble or personal harm and should not be undone by any user."

=== Other reactions ===
In reaction to the controversy, The New York Times business editor Larry Ingrassia sent a memo to his staff commenting on the reliability of Wikipedia and writing, "We shouldn't be using it to check any information that goes into the newspaper." Several other publications commented on the incident, often criticizing Wikipedia and its open editing model as unreliable, citing the Seigenthaler incident as evidence.

The scientific journal Nature conducted a study comparing the accuracy of Wikipedia and the Encyclopædia Britannica in 42 hard sciences–related articles in December 2005. The Wikipedia articles studied were found to contain four serious errors and 162 factual errors, omissions or misleading statements, while the Encyclopædia Britannica also contained four serious errors and 123 factual errors, omissions or misleading statements. Referring to the Seigenthaler incident and several other controversies, the authors wrote that the study "suggests that such high-profile examples are the exception rather than the rule."

The incident damaged Wikipedia's credibility and reputation.

== See also ==
- Bertrand Meyer § Wikipedia hoax – a French academic who was falsely declared dead on the German Wikipedia
