= Hillsborough disaster Wikipedia posts =

2014 Wikipedia controversy about UK political scandal

The Hillsborough disaster Wikipedia posts was an incident of vandalism edits on various Wikipedia articles, mostly the Hillsborough disaster article, via the use of British Government computers, causing a British Government scandal. On 24 April 2014, Oliver Duggan, in the Liverpool Echo, reported that users of computers that used IP addresses registered to the Government Secure Intranet (which was used by many of the United Kingdom's government departments) had added derogatory and offensive material to Wikipedia articles, particularly the article about the Hillsborough disaster. The vandalism was quickly re-reported by other media, and subsequent reports highlighted other acts of vandalism, on various articles, originated by computers using those IP addresses. After an investigation by The Daily Telegraph and Wikipediocracy, the person behind the edits was identified as a "junior civil servant" within the UK government who was dismissed.

== Hillsborough disaster ==
The issue first emerged when it was reported that the entry about the Hillsborough disaster, in which 96 people (Note: a 97th died in 2021) were killed at a football match at the Hillsborough Stadium in 1989, had been altered, briefly, in 2009, with a similar alteration to the Anfield article in 2012. The report suggested that the edits could have been made from the Department for Culture, Media and Sport, Her Majesty's Treasury or the Office of the Solicitor General since those departments use the Government Secure Intranet. However, the Cabinet Office has stated that "At this time, we have no reason to suspect that the Hillsborough edits involve any particular department, nor more than one or two individuals in 2009 and 2012."

The details of the two IP addresses (62.25.106.209 (Note: 62.25.106.209 (talk · contribs · count)) and 195.92.40.49 (Note: 195.92.40.49 (talk · contribs · count))) used by computers on the Government Secure Intranet came from then-Treasury minister Angela Eagle in a reply to a parliamentary question in 2008. The edits, which were made in 2009 (on the disaster's 20th anniversary) and 2012, included the addition of "Blame Liverpool Fans" to the Hillsborough disaster page and adding the phrases "You'll Never Walk Again" and "yet nothing for the victims of the Heysel Stadium disaster" to mentions of the Hillsborough memorial in the Anfield article.

The Cabinet Office responded to the news by saying that they were making "urgent inquiries" into these reports, and that the claims made in them were being treated with "the utmost seriousness". The office also warned, however, that it might not be possible to determine exactly who used the government's computers to make the edits, saying, "As the first incident happened five years ago and there are hundreds of thousands of people on the government's network, it may prove challenging to identify who was involved, but we are exhausting every option." The inquiry was scheduled to be overseen, but not led, by Andy Burnham. On 20 May, Burnham said the investigation had identified "strong leads" into determining who made the edits.

In 2016, after the second verdict of the Hillsborough inquiry proved unlawful killing of the 96 dead due to gross negligence, the Liverpool Echo reported that edits from an IP associated with Warwickshire County Council (WCC) added the phrase "You'll never walk again" eight times in the lead of the Hillsborough disaster page. A WCC spokesperson told the newspaper: "WCC IP addresses also include our publicly used machines in libraries that can be used by members of the public. The information has been passed onto the head of our IT team and we are going to be investigating."

== Other articles ==
On 26 April 2014, the Belfast Telegraph reported that one of the edits made via a government IP address (to the Wikipedia entry for Howick Falls) had mentioned "killing or enslaving" black people and suggested that they believe "hearsay and myth".

The Daily Telegraph reported on 27 April that government computers had been used to maliciously alter articles about prominent people, including falsifying the death of television sports presenter Des Lynam. Other public figures targeted include Michael Grade and Chris Evans. On the same day, The Herald in Glasgow reported that the articles for Clydebank and Barlanark, had been vandalized by government computers. Also that day, the National Post reported that a government computer had also targeted the page about Canadian author David Gilmour, which was vandalized to describe him as a "misogynist, homophobe [and] racist".

On 29 April, the BBC reported the results of its investigation into the edits carried out by computers using the two IP addresses. It found more than one hundred edits that it categorised as "inappropriate editing, vandalism and deletion". The BBC gave no time scale for these edits but did reveal that edits were made in 2005 and 2006 and that "several of the offensive messages were made prior to the government IP addresses being disclosed in 2008".

In October 2006, a change to the veil article included the phrase "all Muslims are terrorists"; this was removed six minutes later. Also highlighted was the removal of details, in October 2005, of the controversy regarding flat purchases by Cherie Blair. Other edits mentioned by the BBC were the editing of the 7 July 2005 London bombings article to add conspiracy theories; and the vandalism, usually with insults and sometimes with page blanking, of the Tony Blair, Richard Littlejohn, Jamie Oliver, Libertines, Wayne Rooney, Christopher Byrne, Peter Levy and Arsène Wenger articles.

Regarding the edits, while stating that the vandalism was appalling, a spokesman for Wikimedia UK pointed out that, "Edits of this nature are removed very quickly by the volunteers who write and edit Wikipedia, often in a matter of minutes." He also expanded on the nature of the editing process, saying "Wikipedia is the encyclopaedia that anyone can edit. This openness has led to an enormous reference work of great value. While vandalism does occasionally happen we are grateful to the many thousands of volunteers who write, edit and organise the content."

== Reactions ==
Jon Davies, chief executive of Wikimedia UK, said he was "appalled by such vandalism" but added that, "In this case, none of the offensive comments were up for more than a couple of hours, and most were removed in a few minutes."

The Cabinet Office described the edits in question as "sickening". "The behaviour is in complete contravention of the Civil Service Code. It is entirely unacceptable," they added.

Sheila Coleman of the Hillsborough Justice Campaign called the edits "absolutely disgusting" and said the relatives of the Hillsborough disaster victims would demand a formal inquiry.

A critic of Wikipedia, Nigel Scott, writing in Spiked, sought to place the incident in the context of what he sees as Wikipedia's structural flaws, saying, "Wikipedia is not blameless in this. It allows misinformation to flourish and provides it with a cloak of respectability. It is under-resourced and is unable to police itself adequately." However, the main focus of his argument was other Wikipedia controversies, including the creation of the Bicholim conflict article, accusations of editing on behalf of Chuka Umunna and the Wiki-PR editing of Wikipedia.

== Result of the investigation ==
From May to June 2014, Wikipediocracy, a website critical of Wikipedia, and The Daily Telegraph identified the culprit behind the offending edits to Wikipedia. Using the results of the investigation published in the Telegraph, the UK government identified and took action against the suspect. In June 2014, an unnamed 24-year-old civil servant, who was born in London but lived in Liverpool, was sacked for posting offensive comments about the disaster on Wikipedia. After the sacking, the United Kingdom government issued new rules for its civil servants with regard to editing Wikipedia. The guidelines include the statement that anyone making inappropriate edits will be disciplined.
