= Eric Newton =

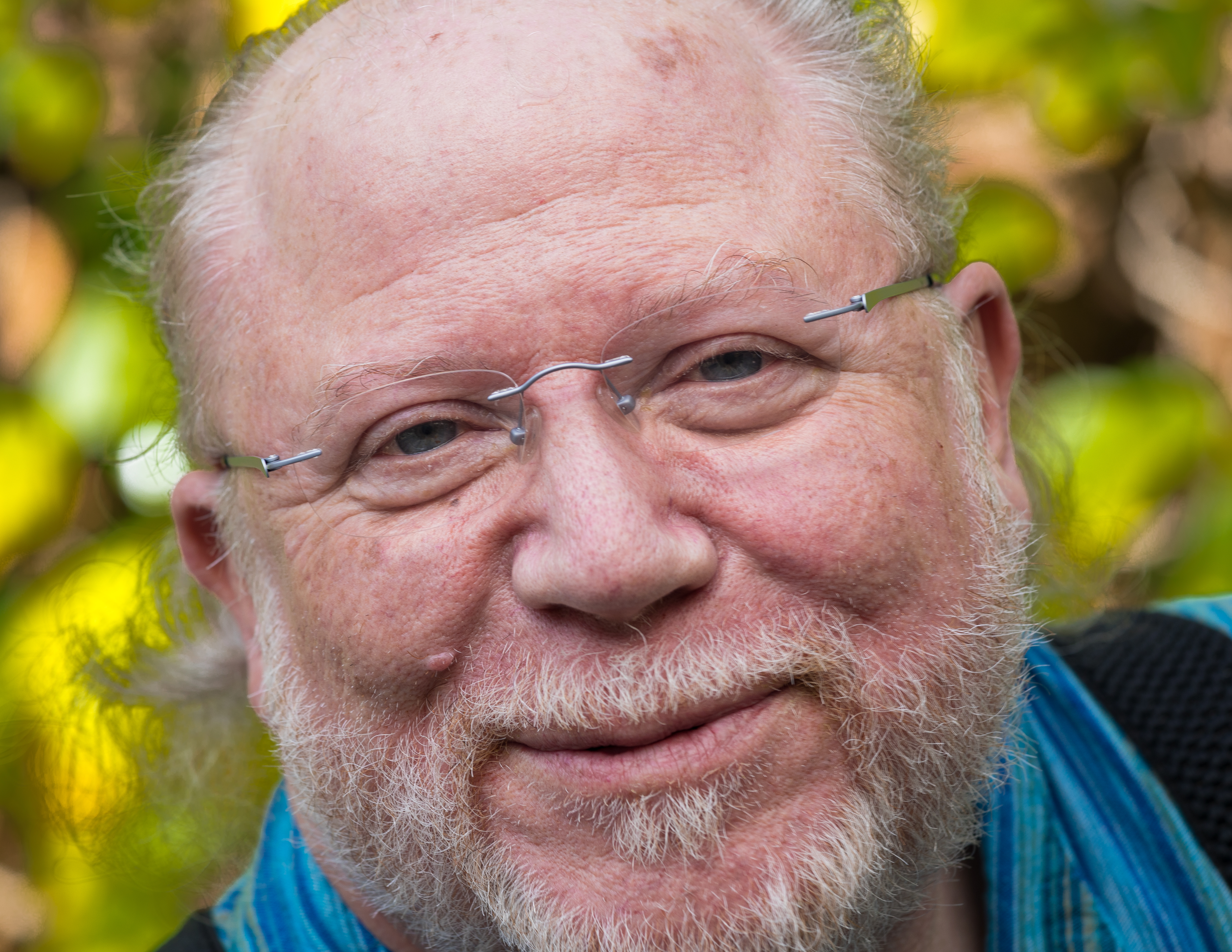
Eric Newton in 2020

Eric Newton is an American journalist, writer and media consultant.

He is a consultant for the John S. and James L. Knight Foundation, an organization created by one of the founding families behind the Knight Ridder newspaper group.

From 2015 to 2020, Newton was Innovation Chief at Arizona State University's Walter Cronkite School of Journalism and Mass Communication. He held the rank of professor of practice and worked closely with the school’s leadership to drive new innovative initiatives at Cronkite News, the school’s multiplatform news operation.

In 2001, Newton joined Knight Foundation as director of journalism initiatives. He oversaw grant development and expanded the journalism and media innovation program. In 2006, he was promoted to vice president/journalism. In 2011, he served as a senior adviser to Knight Foundation President Alberto Ibargüen, working on special projects and endowment grants, and after that became a consultant for the foundation.

Newton became involved in the 2005 Seigenthaler incident after replacing a vandalized English Wikipedia biography of John Seigenthaler Sr. with a copyrighted official biography. After that was removed for violating English Wikipedia policy, Newton's subsequent edits explaining how he had tried to correct English Wikipedia also were rejected as a violation of English Wikipedia's verifiability policy.

== Career ==
Newton earned a B.A. in journalism from San Francisco State University in 1979 and his master's degree in international studies from the University of Birmingham.

He joined the Oakland Tribune as a copy boy in 1977. Turned down for a job as a reporter there in 1979, he edited newspapers in Mill Valley and Richmond before returning to the Tribune as a copy editor in 1984. Within six years he was running the Tribune newsroom.

Newton was city editor, assistant managing editor or managing editor of the Tribune when it won more than 150 awards, including a Pulitzer Prize in news photography for coverage of the 1989 Loma Prieta earthquake. He has since been a Pulitzer Prize juror four times and has written a book on Pulitzer Prize-winning photography.

In 1992, Newton launched the Pacific Coast Center for the Freedom Forum. In 1994, he was founding managing editor for the Newseum, responsible for its story line and content. For four years, from the opening of the original Newseum in 1997 until 2000, he hosted programs in the Newseum's broadcast studio and created publications and traveling exhibits. Newton joined Knight Foundation in June 2001 as director of journalism initiatives. Later he became vice president of the foundation's journalism program. In 2011, he became Senior Adviser to the President.

Newton was founding president of the First Amendment Project, a nonprofit law firm representing citizens seeking access to government records. He shared in a 2004 Peabody Award for Mosaic: World News from the Middle East, a television program created for LinkTV. He received the Reddick Award for distinguished contributions in communications from the University of Texas at Austin, and a special First Amendment Award from the Radio and Television Digital News Association for his role in creating Sunshine Week. In 2012 he won the Markoff Award for support of investigative reporting from the UC Berkeley Investigative Reporting Project.

== Bibliography ==
- Newton, Eric (ed.). The Bay Area at War. Heyday Books (March 1, 1991) ISBN 0-930588-53-3
- Newton, Eric. Crusaders, Scoundrels, Journalists : The Newseum's Most Intriguing Newspeople. Crown; 1st edition (December 9, 1999) ISBN 0-8129-3080-0
- Newton, Eric. The Journalism Quiz. Columbia Journalism Review (May 1, 2000) ISBN B0008IWV0Q
- Newton, Eric. Newsman with a Cause. American Journalism Review. (April 1, 2001) ISBN B0008HTA6K
- Rubin, Cyma, Newton, Eric (eds.). Capture the Moment: The Pulitzer Prize Photographs. W. W. Norton & Company; Reissue edition (November 24, 2003). ISBN 0-393-32282-3
- Newton, Eric. Does a 21st century journalist really have a right to complain? Speech delivered at John S. Knight Fellowships Reunion and Conference at Stanford University, July 9, 2005.
