= Essjay controversy =

Controversy over the identity of a Wikipedia user

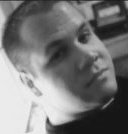
Essjay in 2007

The Essjay controversy was an incident in which Ryan Jordan, a Wikipedia editor who went by the username "Essjay", falsely presented himself as a university professor of religion from 2005 to 2007, during which time he was elected to top positions of trust by the community, including administrator and arbitrator. In July 2006, The New Yorker published an article about "Essjay", and mentioned that he was a university professor of religion. The New Yorker later acknowledged that they did not know his real name. He was hired by Wikia in January 2007 and changed his Wikia profile to identify himself as Ryan Jordan.

Wikipedia co-founder Jimmy Wales initially defended Jordan but eventually asked for his resignation in March 2007. Jordan was shown to have used his supposed credentials to gain an upper hand in some discussions. The incident led to a critique of anonymity on Wikipedia, and a distrust of anonymous self-professed experts among the Wikipedia community.

== The New Yorker interview ==
On July 26, 2006, Wikipedia critic Daniel Brandt started a thread on the unaffiliated discussion site Wikipedia Review titled "Who is Essjay?" (later retitled "Who is Essjay?, Probably he's Ryan Jordan" after Jordan's self-disclosure). Essjay had stated on his Wikipedia user page that he taught graduate theology at a private university, and had doctorates in theology and canon law.

Five days later, Stacy Schiff interviewed Essjay in The New Yorker as a source after he was recommended to her by a member of the Wikimedia Foundation. According to The New Yorker, Essjay "was willing to describe his work as a Wikipedia administrator but would not identify himself other than by confirming the biographical details that appeared on his user page." During the interview, Jordan told The New Yorker that he held doctoral degrees in theology and canon law and worked as a tenured professor at a private university as he had previously stated on his Wikipedia user page.

Jordan, as Essjay, claimed he sent an email to a college professor using his invented persona's credentials, vouching for Wikipedia's accuracy. In the message he wrote in part, "I am an administrator of the online encyclopedia project Wikipedia. I am also a tenured professor of theology; feel free to have a look at my Wikipedia user page (linked below) to gain an idea of my background and credentials."

=== Identity revealed ===
When Essjay was hired by Wikia in January 2007, he changed his Wikia profile and "came clean on who he really was", identifying himself as Ryan Jordan. (Note: According to multiple sources:) Other Wikipedia editors questioned Essjay on his Wikipedia talk page about the apparent discrepancy between his new Wikia profile and his previously claimed credentials. Essjay explained the falsified details as a hedge against online stalking and harassment.

Daniel Brandt then wrote a letter reporting the identity discrepancy to Stacy Schiff and The New Yorker. In late February 2007, the magazine updated its article with a correction indicating that "Essjay now says that his real name is Ryan Jordan, that he is twenty-four and holds no advanced degrees, and that he has never taught."

On February 23, 2007, Jimmy Wales announced the appointment of Essjay to Wikipedia's Arbitration Committee. Wales later asserted that the appointment was "at the request of and unanimous support of" the Arbitration Committee.

On March 6, 2007, the Louisville Courier-Journal published an article casting doubts about his January 2007 claims on his Wikia userpage that he had worked for the United States Trustee Program and had been a Kentucky paralegal. On March 12, 2007, The New Yorker published a formal apology by Wales in its March 19 The Mail section.

== Reaction ==
=== Wikipedia community ===
Speaking personally about Jordan, Wales said, "Mr. Ryan [sic] was a friend, and still is a friend. He is a young man, and he has offered me a heartfelt personal apology, which I have accepted. I hope the world will let him go in peace to build an honorable life and reputation." Wales initially supported Essjay's use of a persona, saying, "I regard it as a pseudonym and I don't really have a problem with it." Later, around March 5, 2007, Wales withdrew his support and asked for Essjay's resignation from his positions with Wikipedia and Wikia. Wales stated that he withdrew his support when he learned that "Essjay used his false credentials in content disputes" on Wikipedia.

Essjay had responded at the time with a statement on his Wikipedia page, in part reading:

...I *am* sorry if anyone in the Wikipedia community has been hurt by my decision to use disinformation to protect myself. I'm not sorry that I protected myself; I believed, and continue to believe, that I was right to protect myself, in light of the problems encountered on the Internet in these trying times. I have spoken to all of my close friends here about this, and have heard resoundingly that they understand my position, and they support me. Jimbo and many others in Wikipedia's hierarchy have made their support known as well...

Among the Wikipedia community, responses ranged from offering complete support to accusing Jordan of fraud, with most editors taking a critical view of Jordan's actions.

As the controversy unfolded, the Wikipedia community began a review of Essjay's previous edits and some felt he had relied upon his fictional professorship to influence editorial consideration of edits he made. "People have gone through his edits and found places where he was basically cashing in on his fake credentials to bolster his arguments", said Michael Snow, a Wikipedia administrator and founder of the Wikipedia community newspaper, The Signpost. "Those will get looked at again." In a disagreement over the editing of the article Imprimatur, for example, Essjay defended his use of Catholicism for Dummies by telling other editors, "This is a text I often require for my students, and I would hang my own Ph.D. on it's [sic] credibility." Essjay falsely claimed academic credentials as a professor of theology, a fact later exposed by the media. Jimmy Wales proposed a credential verification system on Wikipedia following the Essjay controversy, but the proposal was rejected. Wales was "reported to be considering vetting all persons who adjudicate on factual disputes." "I don't think this incident exposes any inherent weakness in Wikipedia, but it does expose a weakness that we will be working to address", Wales added. He insisted that Wikipedia editors still would be able to remain anonymous if they wished. "We always prefer to give a positive incentive rather than absolute prohibition, so that people can contribute without a lot of hassle", Wales commented. However, he also warned that "It's always inappropriate to try to win an argument by flashing your credentials, and even more so if those credentials are inaccurate." However, Florence Devouard, chair of the Wikimedia Foundation, was not supportive of his credential proposal, saying, "I think what matters is the quality of the content, which we can improve by enforcing policies such as 'cite your source,' not the quality of credentials showed by an editor." A formal proposal that users claiming to have academic qualifications would need to provide evidence before citing them in content disputes was eventually rejected by the Wikipedia community, like all previous such proposals.

Larry Sanger, a co-founder of Wikipedia, who left the project in 2002, called Essjay's response "a defiant non-apology" and elsewhere characterized Essjay's actions as "identity fraud".

=== News media reactions ===
Andrew Orlowski criticized Jimmy Wales for hiring Essjay at the venture-capital-funded Wikia and for appointing him to the Wikipedia Arbitration Committee after Essjay had apparently admitted his previously claimed academic and professional credentials were false. Orlowski added that Essjay's actions betrayed a dangerous community mindset within Wikipedia. Steve Maich, a journalist at Maclean's, stated that the controversy could damage Wikipedia's future as a media business operation, since Wikipedia's model was supposedly built upon trust and credibility.

Cassandra Jardine wrote in The Daily Telegraph that "Essjay has provided a reminder that any given entry [on Wikipedia] could have been written by someone as ignorant as ourselves. On the other hand, no one has taken issue with his edits, only his assumed persona, so perhaps the real lesson of this democratic medium is that college drop-outs might be as authoritative as professors."

Alex Beam criticized the Essjay controversy as being part of what he characterizes as the problems of "crowdsourcing" and the "wisdom of crowds", asserting that the crowd accepts authority unquestioningly: "Who would you rather have write your encyclopedia entries? Bertrand Russell, T.H. Huxley, and Benedetto Croce, who wrote for the Britannica? Or ... EssJay?" Andrew Keen similarly described the controversy as an example of ignoring expert guidance in favor of the "dictatorship of idiots."

=== Academics' reactions ===
On March 2, 2007, a report in The Chronicle of Higher Education commented "the incident is clearly damaging to Wikipedia's credibility—especially with professors who will now note that one of the site's most visible academics has turned out to be a fraud."

Media scholar Axel Bruns stated that while what Essjay did was "clearly deceptive and unethical", the controversy "does not undermine the Wikipedia model."

Nicola Pratt, a lecturer in international relations at the University of East Anglia in England, stated, "The ethos of Wikipedia is that anyone can contribute, regardless of status... What's relevant is their knowledge as judged by other readers, not whether they are professors or not—and the fact the student [Essjay] was exposed shows it works."

A 2009 article published by the National Council of Teachers of English used the Essjay incident to set the context for a discussion of the challenges of determining textual origins in college compositions.

== See also ==
- Argument from authority – Logical fallacy
- List of Wikipedia controversies
- On the Internet, nobody knows you're a dog – Adage and meme about internet anonymity
- Reliability of Wikipedia
- Zhemao hoaxes
