= Prathiba M. Singh =

Judge of Delhi High Court

Hon'ble Ms. Justice Prathiba Maninder Singh

Judge of Delhi High Court
- Incumbent
- Assumed office 15 May 2017
- Nominated by: J. S. Khehar
- Appointed by: Pranab Mukherjee

Personal details
- Born: 20 July 1968 (age 58)
- Education: Bangalore University

Prathiba Maninder Singh (born 20 July 1968) is a judge of the Delhi High Court, in India. She has made significant contributions to academic literature and legal developments in Indian intellectual property law, as a practicing lawyer, and as an advisor to several legislative committees concerned with drafting related legislation.

== Personal life ==
Singh studied law at the University Law College in Bengaluru, Karnataka, and obtained an LL.M. from the University of Cambridge on a Cambridge Commonwealth Trust scholarship. In 2013, she established the Prathiba Singh Scholarship for LL.M candidates at the University of Cambridge, to provide financial support to Indian students who were studying for a Masters in Law.

== Career ==
=== Litigation ===
Singh joined the bar in 1991 and practiced primarily in the field of intellectual property law, acting as the managing partner in a law firm. She was appointed by the Delhi High Court to consult with them to improve the functioning of the Copyright Office, and also consulted with a High Level Parliamentary Panel on streamlining the patent examination process in India. She has also provided expert advice to parliamentary committees on proposed amendments to intellectual property laws in India, including the Patents Act, and Copyright Amendment Act, 2012. Singh was also a member of a panel that was constituted to draft India's National Intellectual Rights Policy in 2014.

Singh was appointed a senior counsel by the Delhi High Court in 2013.

In her capacity as the president of the Asian Patent Attorney Association, Singh had filed a writ petition in the Delhi High Court, challenging the limited resources allocated to the Indian Intellectual Property Appellate Board (IPAB), and following directions from the court in her petition, a permanent office for the IPAB was established in Delhi.

=== Judiciary ===
Singh was appointed a permanent judge in the Delhi High Court on 15 May 2017. In 2019, Singh issued an order criticising the functioning of the Indian Intellectual Property Appellate Board, calling for reforms and restructuring.
