= Andrew Leonard (journalist) =

American journalist

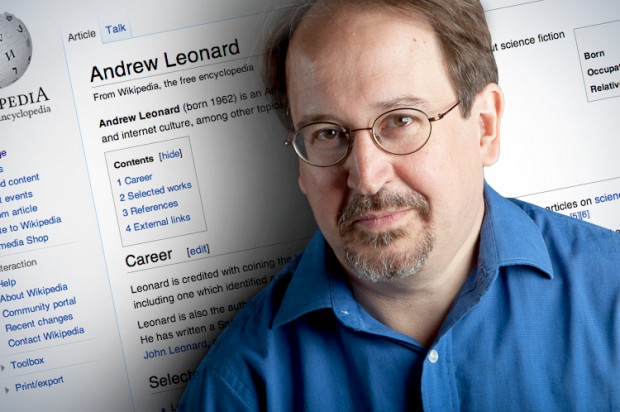
- Leonard in 2013
- Born: 1962 (age 63–64)
- Occupation: Journalist
- Relatives: John Leonard (father)

Andrew Leonard (born 1962) is an American journalist who writes feature articles for San Francisco and contributes to Medium. From 1995 to 2014 he wrote for Salon.com. He has also written for Wired.

== Career ==
Leonard is credited with coining the term "open-source journalism". He is the author of Bots: The Origin of New Species, which The New York Times called a "playful social history of the internet". According to Christopher Lehmann-Haupt, also writing in the Times, the book is "deceptively profound". Bots was one of the first few books published by Wired's nonfiction publishing venture HardWired, launched in 1996.

For six years as a financial analyst for Salon.com, Leonard wrote a blog, How the World Works, covering topics such as speculation in the car market, the Bankruptcy Abuse Prevention and Consumer Protection Act, and immigration reform.

Currently he is the writer of the popular newsletter titled, "The Cleaver and the Butterfly".

Leonard is the son of the American literary, television, film, and cultural critic John Leonard.

== Selected works ==
- Leonard, Andrew (1998). Bots: The Origin of New Species. Penguin Group. ISBN 978-0-14-027566-7.
