= Wikipedia Review =

Blog discussing Wikimedia Foundation projects

- The Wikipedia Review logo, which uses a white hat
- Website type: Internet watchdog, Internet forum and blog
- Available in: English, German
- Revenue: Accepts donations
- Website: wikipediareview.com
- Commercial: No
- Registration: Optional (required to post)
- Launched: Original site: November 2005; 21 years ago Current site: February 19, 2006; 20 years ago
- Current status: Offline

Wikipedia Review was an Internet forum and blog for the discussion of Wikimedia Foundation projects, in particular the content and conflicts of Wikipedia. Wikipedia Review sought to act as a watchdog website, scrutinizing Wikipedia and reporting on its flaws. It provided an independent forum to discuss Wikipedia editors and their influence on Wikipedia content. At its peak, participants included current Wikipedia editors, former Wikipedia editors, users banned from Wikipedia, and people who had never edited. The last post was on 31 May 2012.

== Background ==
The site was founded in November 2005 by "Igor Alexander", and hosted by ProBoards. On 19 February 2006 it moved to its own domain name using Invision Power Board software. The site required registration using a valid e-mail address to post and blacklisted email providers that allowed anonymity so as to discourage the operation of multiple accounts by a single user. In its early years, the forum became a gathering place for critics of Wikipedia and its policies, attracting both former editors and outside observers interested in discussing issues related to online collaboration and reliability of information.

Wikipedia Review was cited for its discussion of wiki-editing concepts and its participation in the evaluation of the Palo Alto Research Company's WikiDashboard.

== Commentary ==
Wikipedia Review is not a conspiracy, a team-building exercise, a role-playing game, or an experiment in collusion. It is not meant as a resource or training ground for those who would instill fear and misery in others. It does not exist to corrupt, but to expose corruption; it does not exist to tear down institutions, but to expose the ways in which institutions are torn down; it does not exist to hate, but is meant to expose hate in others. To expose these things is not evil. It is not a monolithic entity, nor the sum of its parts. Like-mindedness does not imply singularity of purpose; respect for the rights of one group does not imply disrespect for the rights of another. It is not intended to be predictable, consistent, or dull.

Imagine a world in which human beings are not user accounts, are not programmable, and are not mere words on a display screen. That's what we're doing...

— Statement made when the site was out of service in 2008, Wikipedia Review

Seth Finkelstein wrote in The Guardian that Wikipedia Review has provided a focal point for investigation into Wikipedia-related matters such as the "Essjay controversy". Cade Metz, writing for The Register, credited Wikipedia Review with the discovery of a private mailing list that led to the resignation of a Wikipedia administrator; he also wrote that a Wikipedia proposal called "BADSITES" intended to ban the mention of Wikipedia Review and similar sites on Wikipedia. The Independent noted that "allegations against certain administrators came to a head on a site called Wikipedia Review, where people debate the administrators' actions." The Irish technology website Silicon Republic suggested visiting Wikipedia Review in order to "follow disputes, discussions, editors and general bureaucracy on Wikipedia". Philip Coppens used posts made on Wikipedia Review to help construct a report, published in Nexus, on WikiScanner and allegations that intelligence agencies had been using Wikipedia to spread disinformation.

== Content and structure ==
Wikipedia Review's publicly accessible forums are broken up into four general topic areas:

1. Forum information;
2. Wikimedia-oriented discussion, which contains subforums focusing on editors, the Wikipedia bureaucracy, meta discussion, articles and general Wikimedia-focused topics not fitting elsewhere;
3. Media forums containing a news feed and discussion about news and blogs featuring Wikipedia/Wikimedia; and
4. Off topic, non-Wikimedia related discussion.
