= QRpedia =

QR codes linking to Wikipedia articles

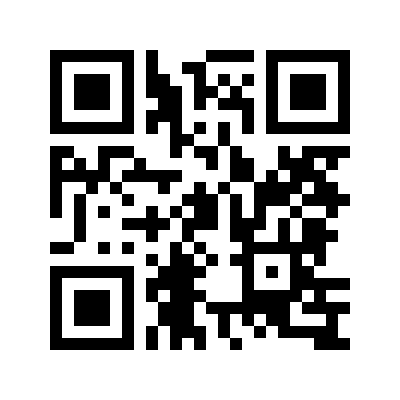
- A QRpedia code which resolves as the URL http://en.qrwp.org/QRpedia, used widely as the logo

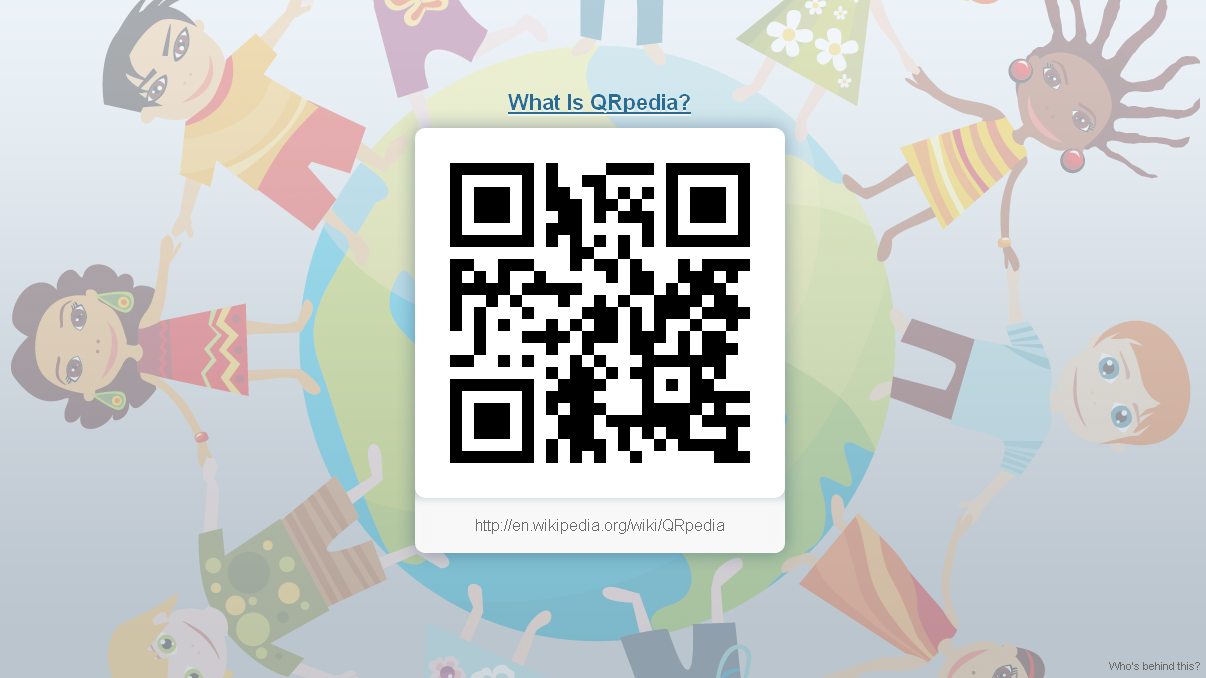
- Screenshot The QRpedia website, showing a QR code, which decodes as the URL http://en.qrwp.org/QRpedia
- Available in: Multilingual
- Creators: Terence Eden; Roger Bamkin
- Website: qrpedia.org
- Commercial: No
- Registration: None
- Launched: 9 April 2011; 15 years ago
- Current status: Online
- Content licence: MIT Licence

QRpedia is a mobile Web-based system which uses QR codes to deliver Wikipedia articles to users, in their preferred language. A typical use is on museum labels, linking to Wikipedia articles about the exhibited object. QR codes can easily be generated to link directly to any Uniform Resource Identifier (URI), but the QRpedia system adds further functionality. It is owned and operated by a subsidiary of Wikimedia UK (WMUK).

QRpedia was conceived by Roger Bamkin, a Wikipedia volunteer, coded by Terence Eden, and unveiled in April 2011. It is in use at museums and other institutions in countries including Australia, Bulgaria, the Czech Republic, Estonia, Malaysia, North Macedonia, Spain, India, the United Kingdom, Germany, South Africa, Sweden, Ukraine and the United States. The project's source code is freely reusable under the MIT License.

== Process ==
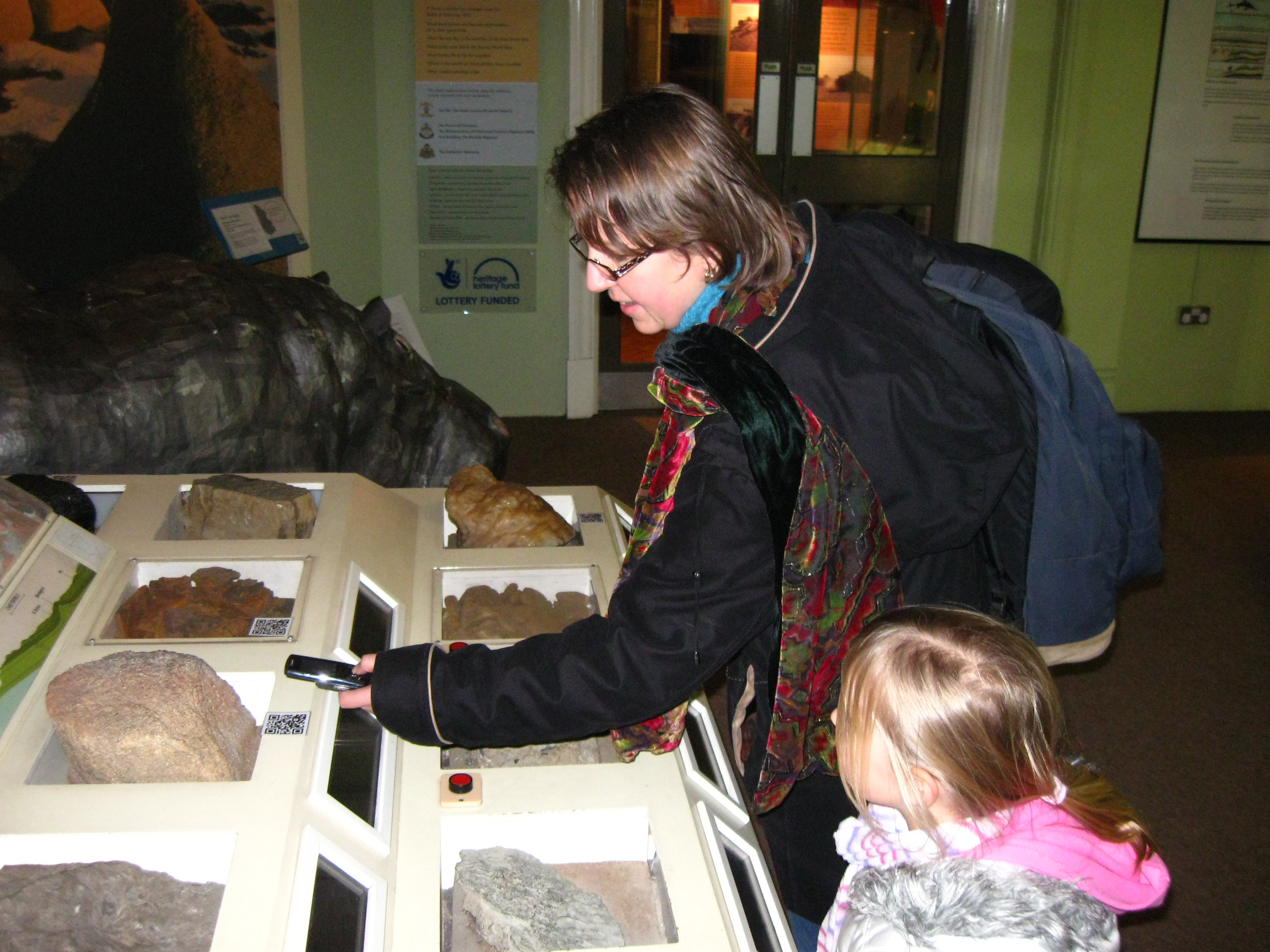
Visitors to Derby Museum using a mobile phone to scan a QRpedia QR code

When a user scans a QRpedia QR code on their mobile device, the device decodes the QR code into a Uniform Resource Locator (URL) using the domain name "languagecode.qrwp.org" and whose path (final part) is the title of a Wikipedia article, and sends a request for the article specified in the URL to the QRpedia web server. It also transmits the language setting of the device.

The QRpedia server then uses Wikipedia's API to determine whether there is a version of the specified Wikipedia article in the language used by the device, and if so, returns it in a mobile-friendly format. If there is no version of the article available in the preferred language, then the QRpedia server offers a choice of the available languages, or a Google translation.

In this way, one QRcode can deliver the same article in many languages, even when the museum is unable to make its own translations. QRpedia also records usage statistics.

== Origins ==
QRpedia was conceived by Roger Bamkin, a Wikipedia volunteer, and Terence Eden, a mobile web consultant, and was unveiled on 9 April 2011 at Derby Museum and Art Gallery's Backstage Pass event, part of the "GLAM/Derby" collaboration between the museum and Wikipedia, during which over 1,200 Wikipedia articles, in several languages, were also created. The project's name is a portmanteau word, combining the initials "QR" from "QR (Quick Response) code" and "pedia" from "Wikipedia".

The project's source code is freely reusable under the MIT License.

== Implementations ==
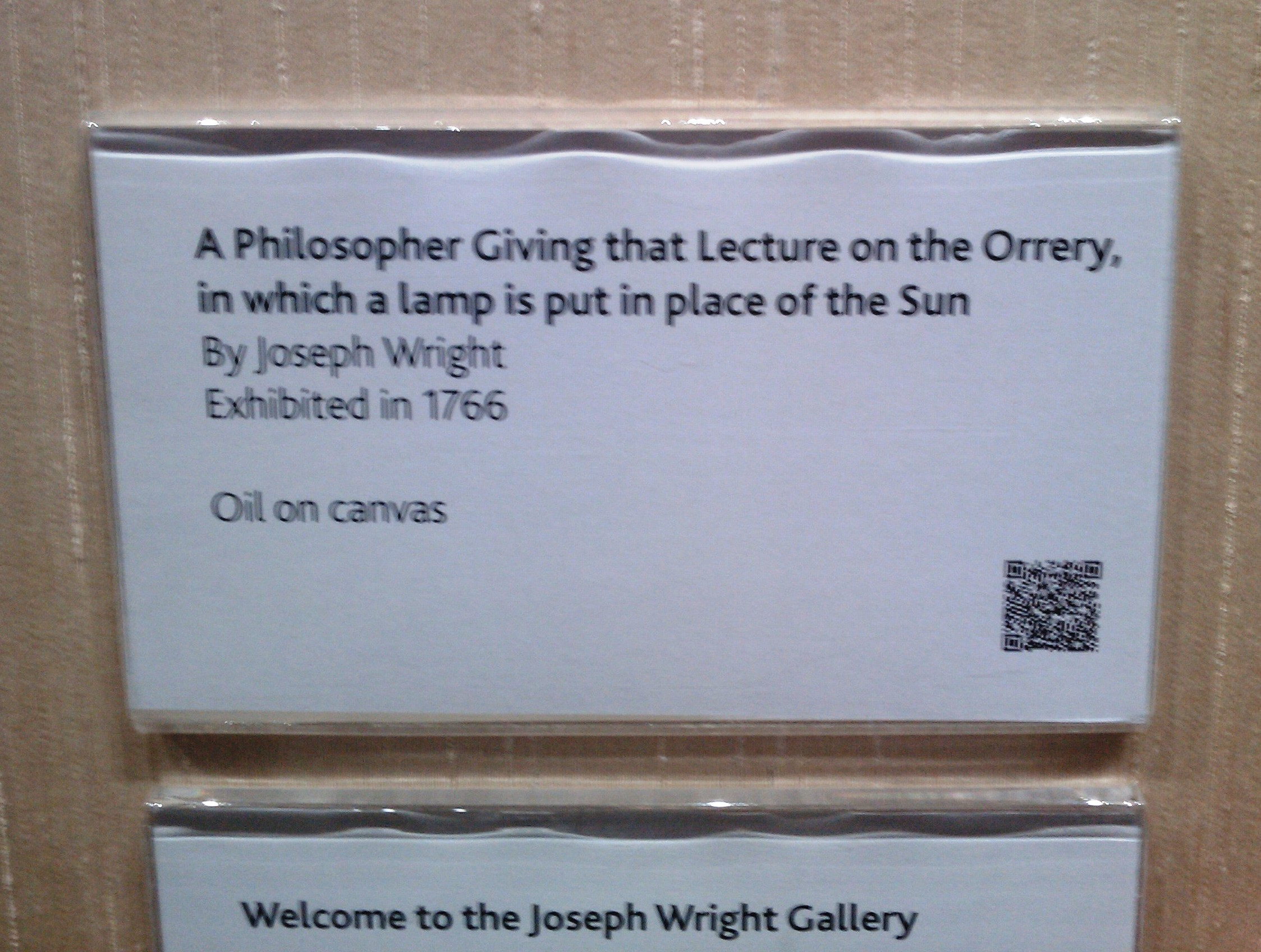
Derby Museum's label for the painting "A Philosopher Lecturing on the Orrery" features a QRpedia code linking to the Wikipedia article about it which, as of February 2012, was available in 19 languages.

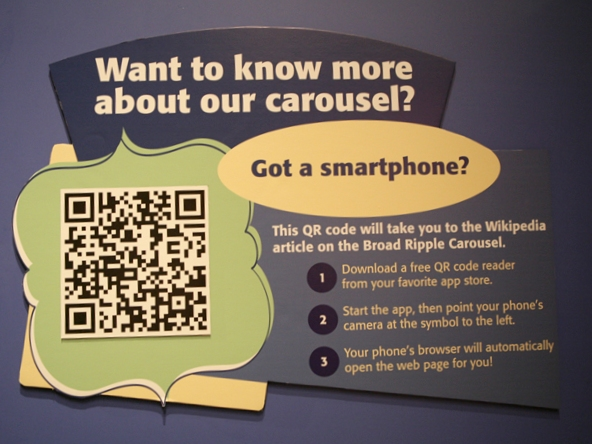
A label in The Children's Museum of Indianapolis that uses a QRpedia code to direct visitors to the Wikipedia article "Broad Ripple Park Carousel"

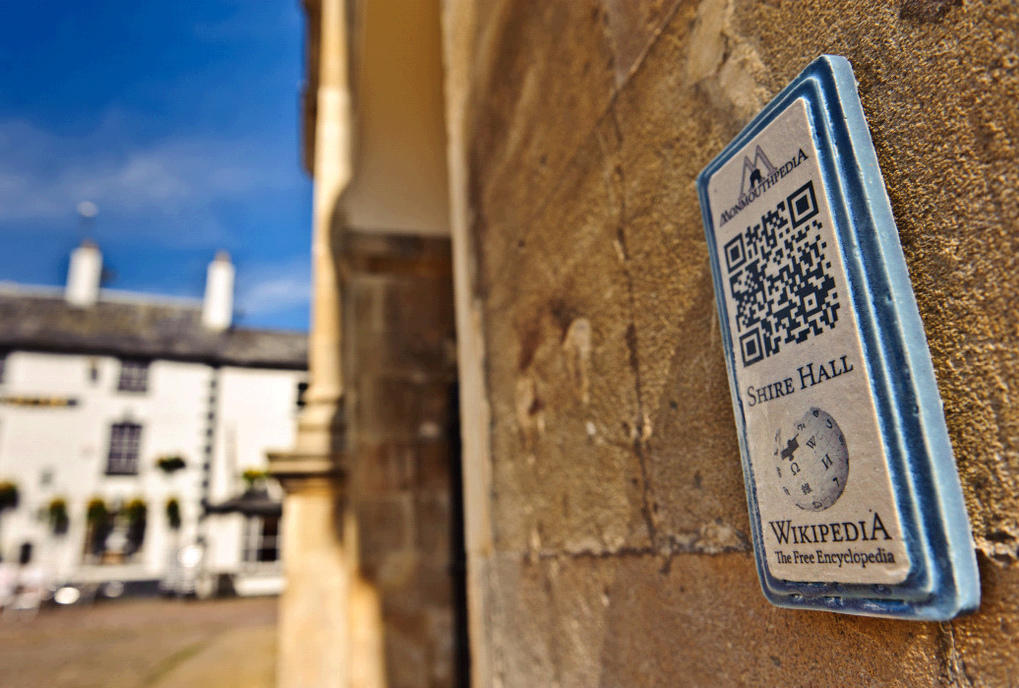
Ceramic plaque with QRpedia code for Shire Hall, as part of the MonmouthpediA project

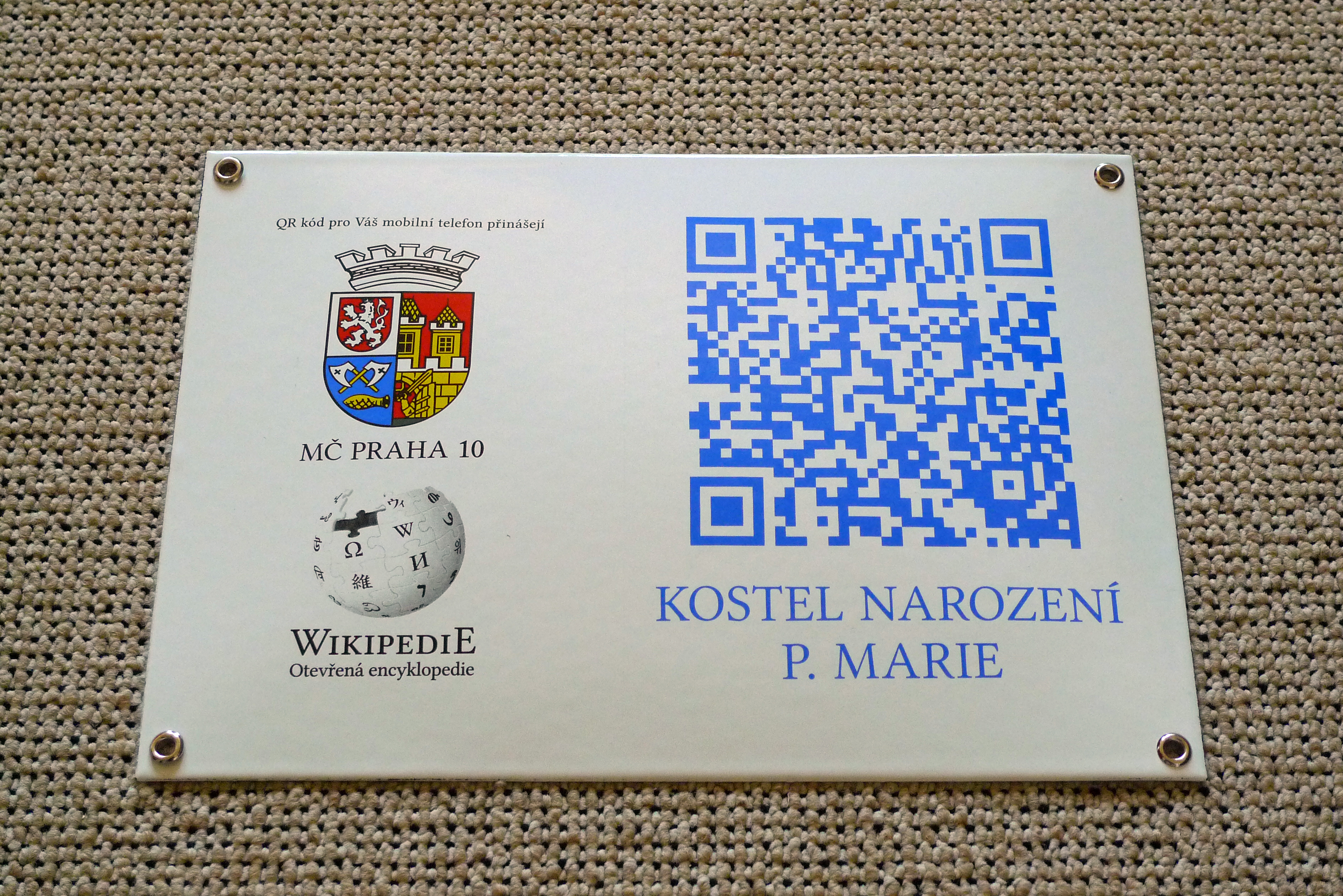
Enamel sign with QRpedia code for Church of the Nativity of the Virgin Mary in Záběhlice, Prague, Czech Republic

Film showing the use of QRpedia codes in a touch table populated with Wikipedia articles related to the period 1600-1650 and with coordinates. The table is used in the exhibition Samtidigt/Meanwhile, at the Vasa museum in Stockholm, Sweden.

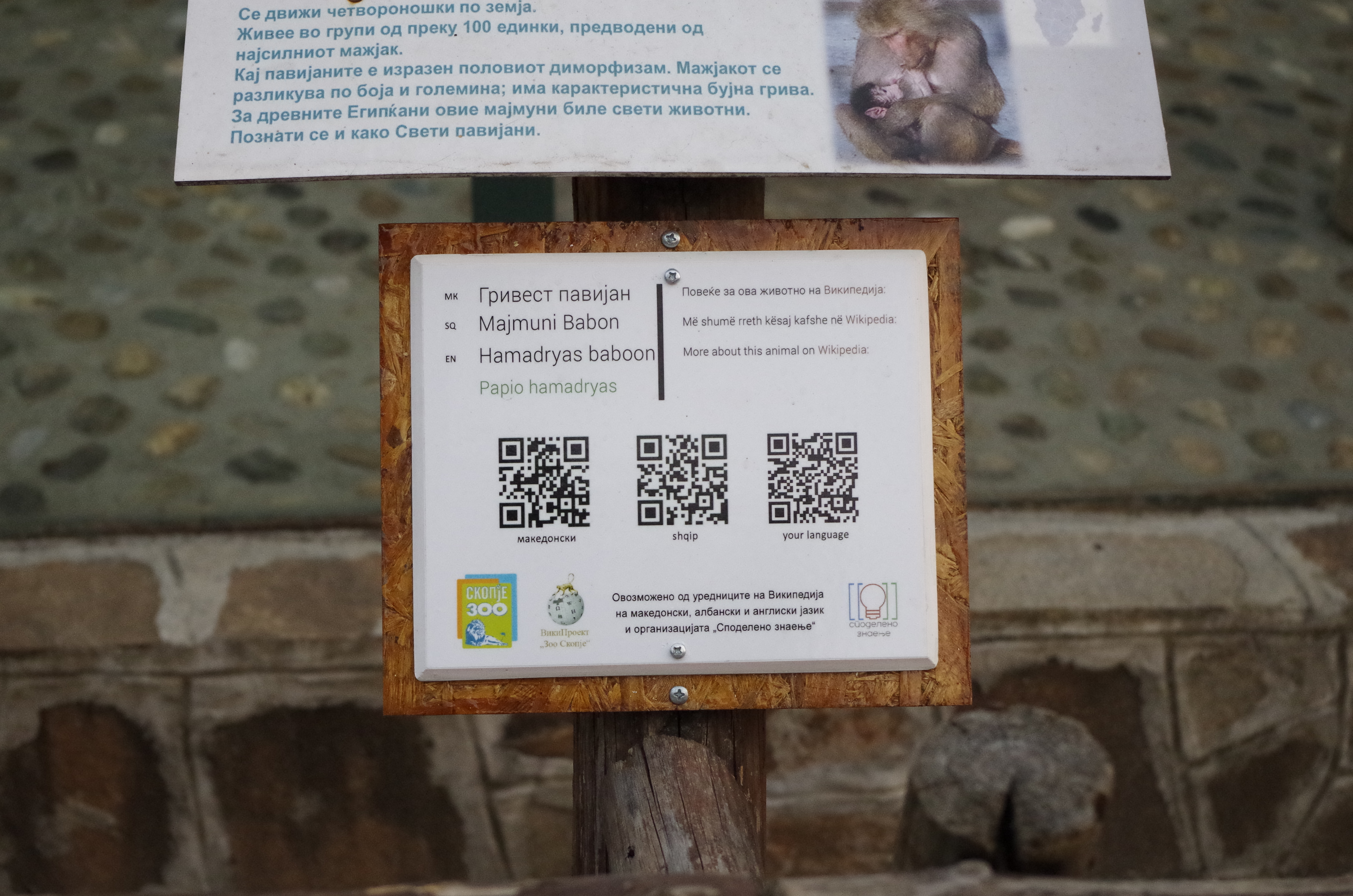
A QRpedia plaque in Skopje Zoo, North Macedonia, showing info on a hamadryas baboon (Papio hamadryas) using a mixed approach

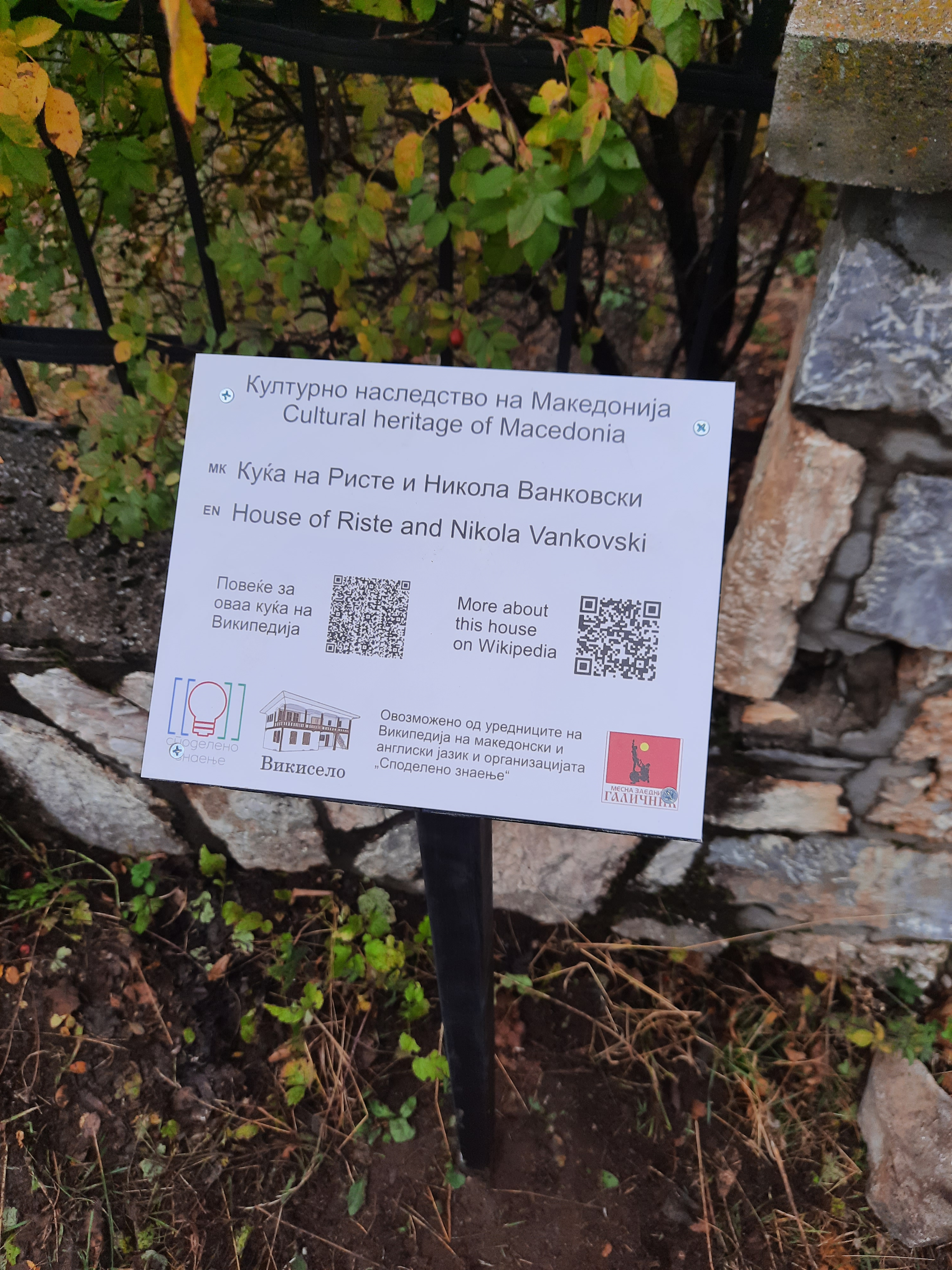
A plaque on its holder. Village of Galičnik, North Macedonia.

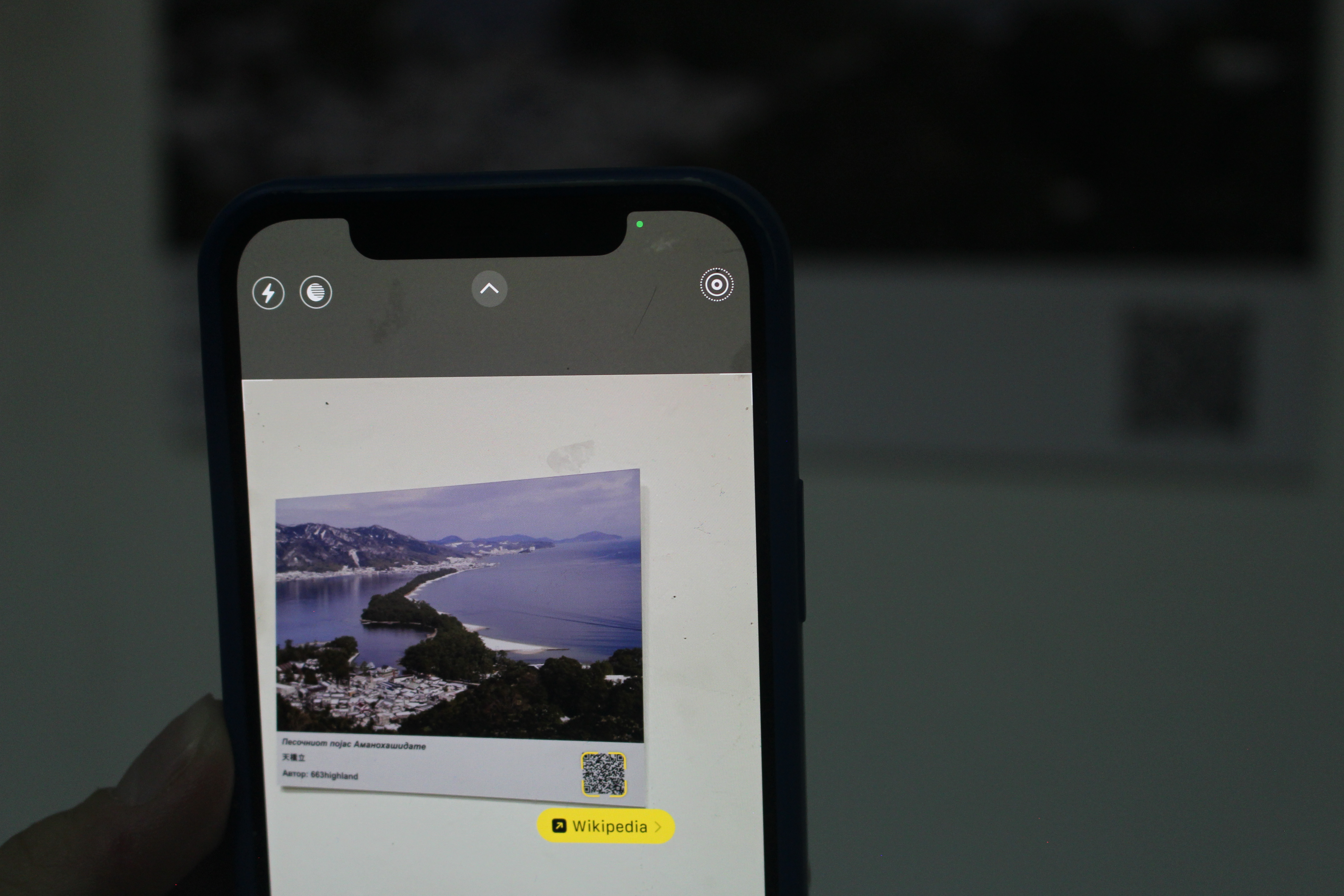
Scanning process in Skopje

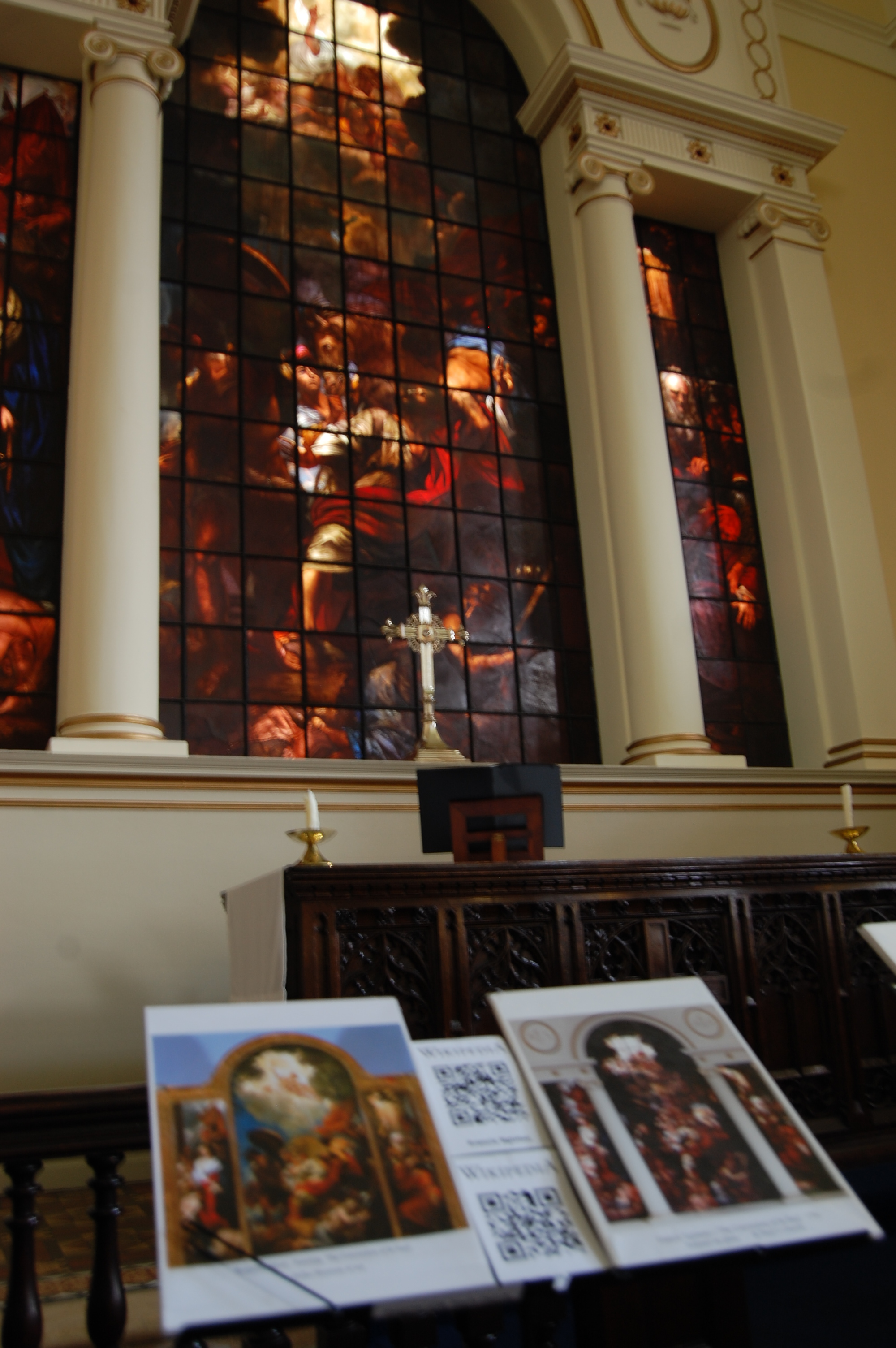
Before the East window of St Paul's Church, Birmingham

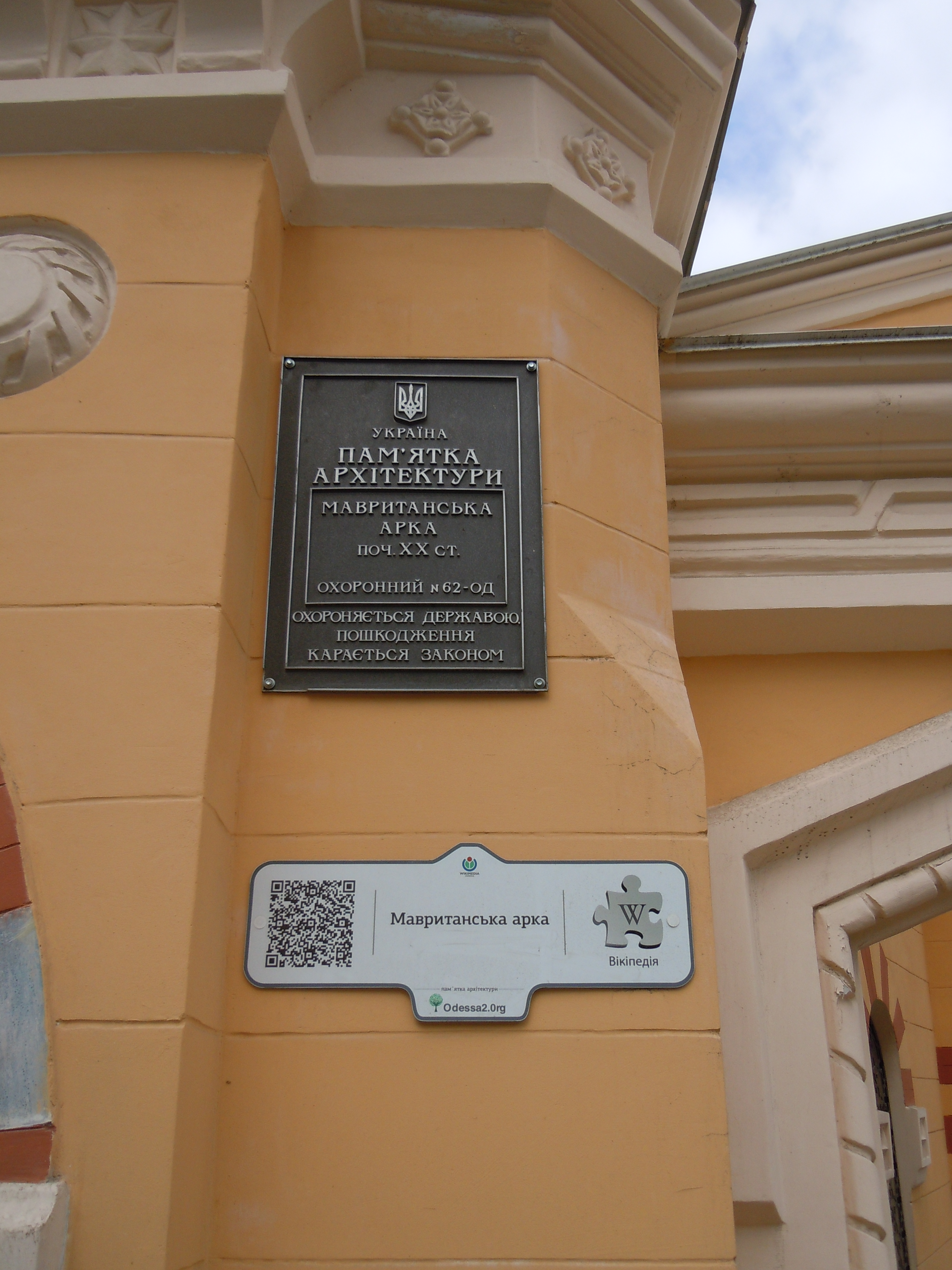
Mauritanian arch in Odesa, Ukraine, 2014

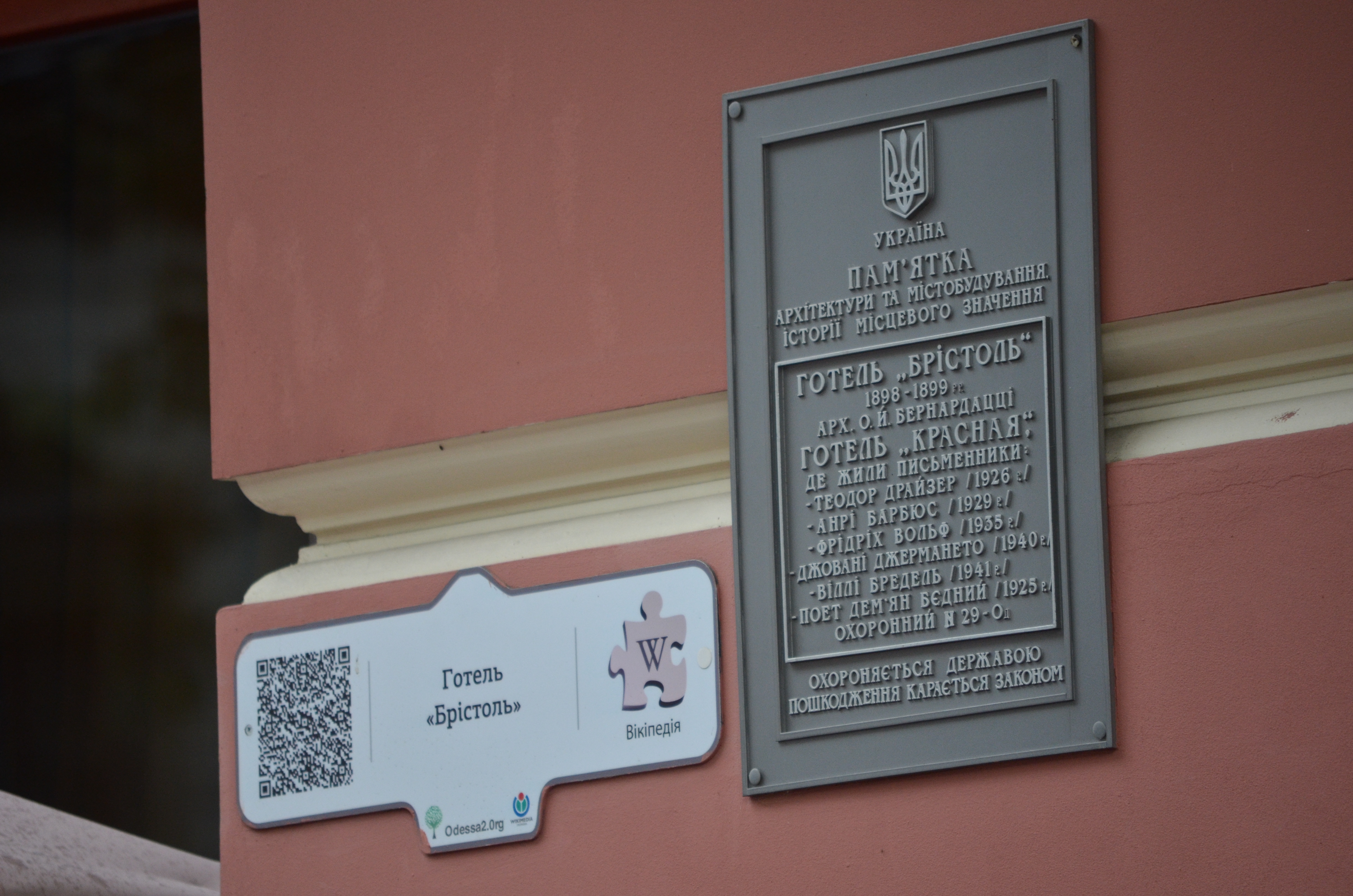
Bristol Hotel in Odesa, 2014

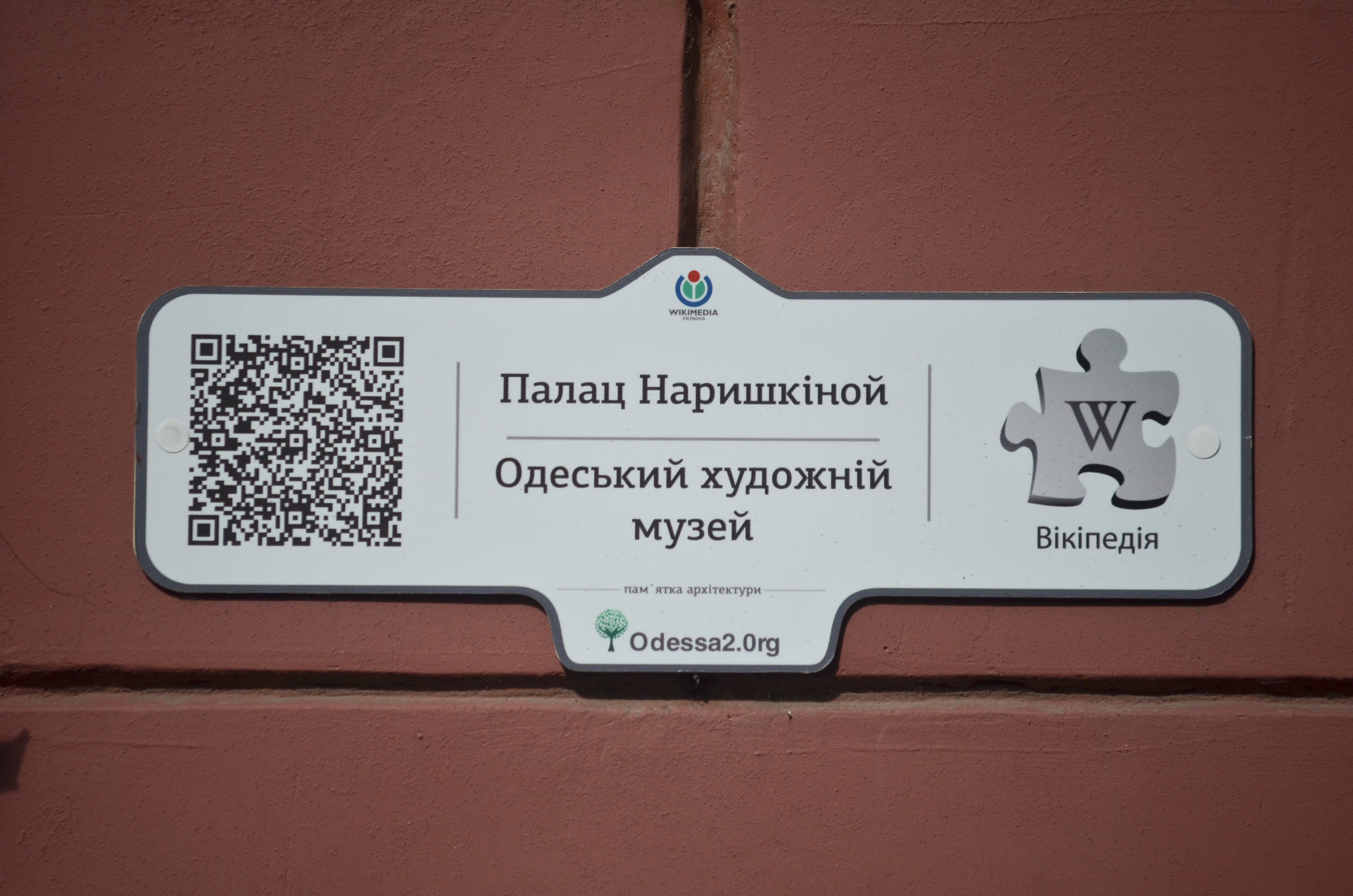
Odesa Art Museum (ex-Potocki Palace) in Odesa

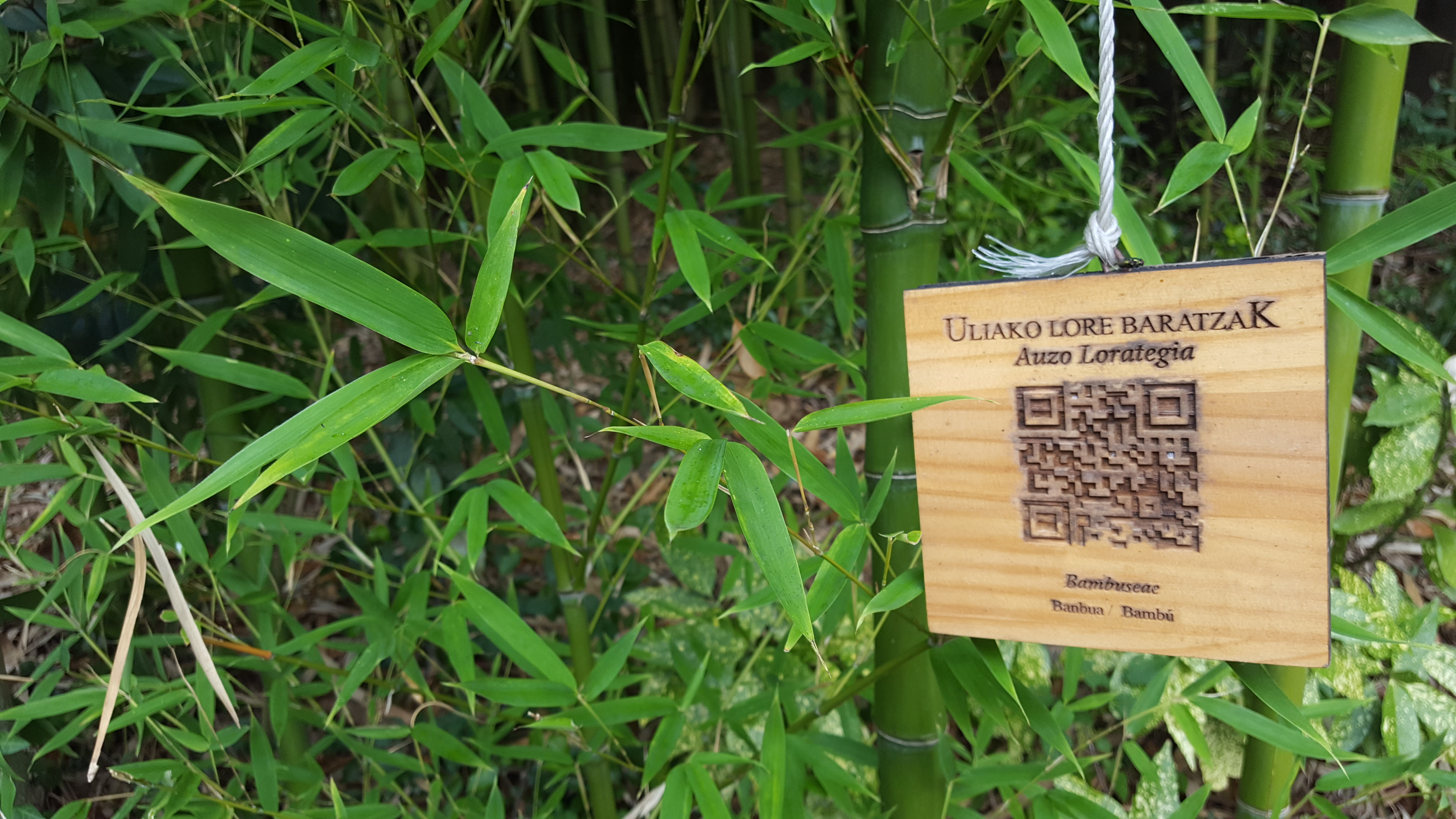
Information on the bamboo plant in San Sebastian's Ulia park

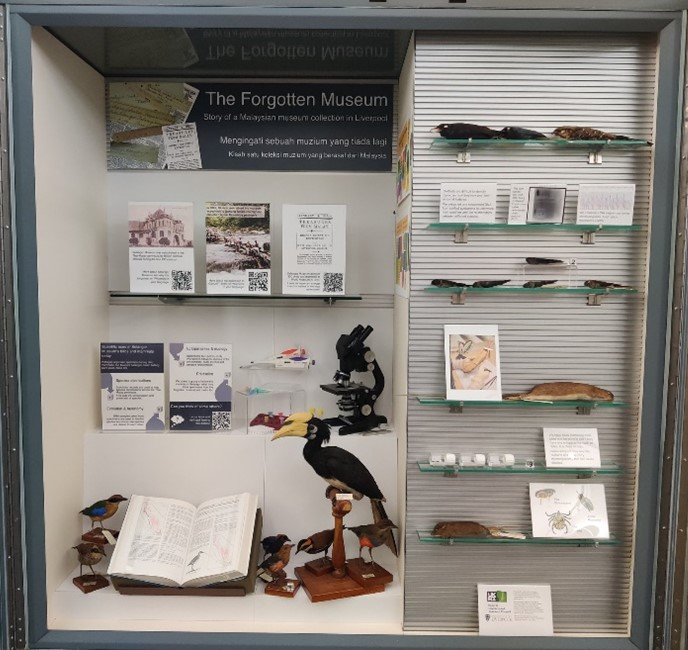
The Forgotten Museum Display about the Selangor Museum collection at World Museum, Liverpool.

Though created in the United Kingdom, QRpedia can be used in any location as long as the user's phone or tablet has a data signal (or remembers URLs until a signal is available) and is or has been in use at venues including:

- Children's Chapel, St James' Church, Sydney
- The Children's Museum of Indianapolis, United States
- Congressional Cemetery
- Derby Museum and Art Gallery, England
- Estonian Sports Museum
- Galleries of Justice Museum
- Fundació Joan Miró, Spain including a travelling exhibit shown at The Tate
- The Welsh town of Monmouth, as part of Wikipedia's MonmouthpediA project.
- The National Archives, United Kingdom
- The National Museum of Computing (UK)
- The New Art Gallery Walsall
- Different monuments in Prague 10
- Skopje Zoo, Macedonia, using a mixed approach of ordinary QR-codes and QRpedia codes
- St Paul's Church, Birmingham
- QRpedia codes in Odesa, Ukraine

QRpedia also has uses outside of such institutions. For example, the Occupy movement have used it on campaign posters.

== Award ==
In January 2012, QRpedia was one of four projects (from 79 entrants) declared the most innovative mobile companies in the UK of 2011 by the Smart UK Project, and thus chosen to compete at Mobile World Congress in Barcelona, on 29 February 2012. The criteria were "to be effective, easy to understand and with global potential and impact".

== Wikimedia UK dispute ==
A conflict of interest case involving QRpedia was identified as one of the "main incidents" leading to a 2012 review of the governance of Wikimedia UK (WMUK). The review found that the amount of time taken to resolve ownership caused the risk of outsiders perceiving a potential conflict of interest, and that Bamkin's acceptance of consultancy fees on projects (jointly funded by WMUK) involving QRpedia provided an opportunity for damage to the reputation of WMUK. This conflict of interest led to the resignation of WMUK trustee Joscelyn Upendran. Shortly before her resignation on 31 August 2012, Upendran stated that "the charity has in effect agreed to take on responsibility [...] for a service that is 'co-owned' by a trustee", and suggested that "the conflict of interest may present a legal risk under charity and corporate law". On 9 February 2013, WMUK announced that the intellectual property in QRpedia, and the qrpedia.org and qrwp.org domains, were to be transferred to the chapter at no cost. On 12 February 2013, two QRpedia related domain names were registered on behalf of WMUK. On 2 April 2013, WMUK announced that Roger Bamkin and Terence Eden were transferring ownership of QRpedia to Wikimedia UK. On 16 November 2013, WMUK announced that the agreement for the transfer had been signed and the IP rights in QRpedia were held by Cultural Outreach Limited, a wholly owned subsidiary of WMUK, and that following the agreement, the transfer of the domain names was an administrative process that could begin immediately.

At least one Wikimedia chapter received letters alleging that QRpedia infringes various patents. Though WMUK believes that this is not the case and that the risk of litigation is not high, Cultural Outreach Limited was set up to hold QRpedia, in order to shield WMUK should such a challenge arise.

== See also ==
- Amarapedia
- Monmouthpedia
- Gibraltarpedia
- Freopedia
- Toodyaypedia
