= Gibraltarpedia =

Project by the Government of Gibraltar

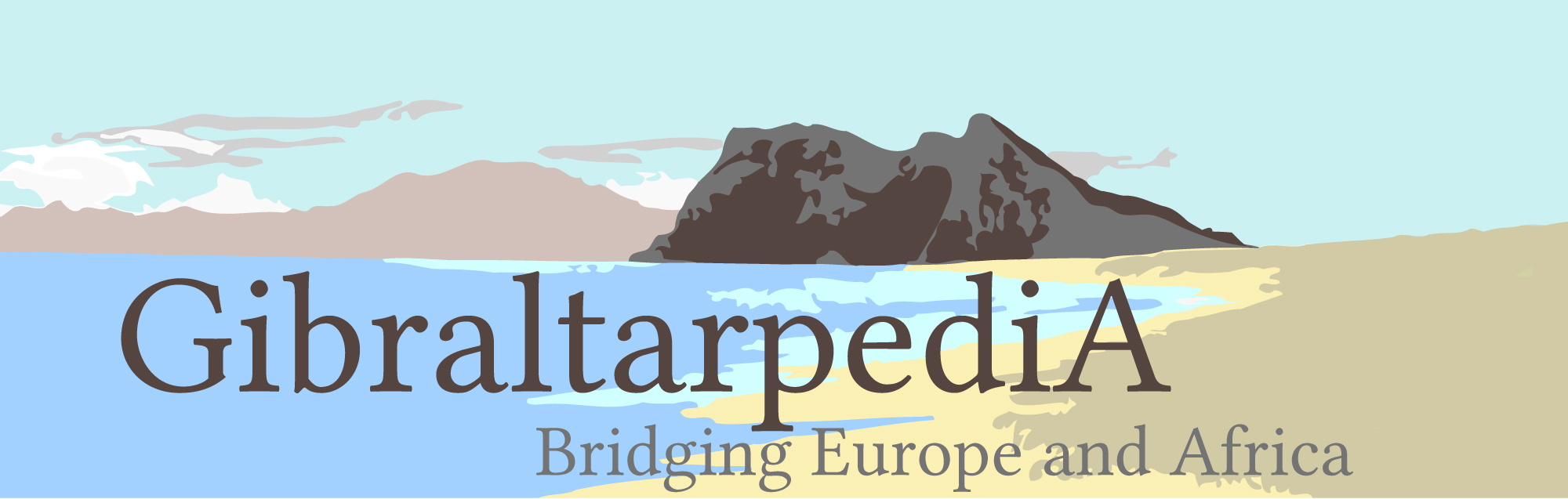
- The project's logo, depicting Europe (Rock of Gibraltar) and Africa (Jebel Musa)
- Available in: Multilingual
- Creators: Tyson Lee Holmes; John Cummings; Roger Bamkin; Government of Gibraltar; Gibraltar Tourist Board
- Commercial: No
- Launched: 12 July 2012; 14 years ago
- Content license: Creative Commons Attribution/ Share-Alike 3.0

Video used to introduce Gibraltarpedia at Wikimania 2012 in Washington, D.C.

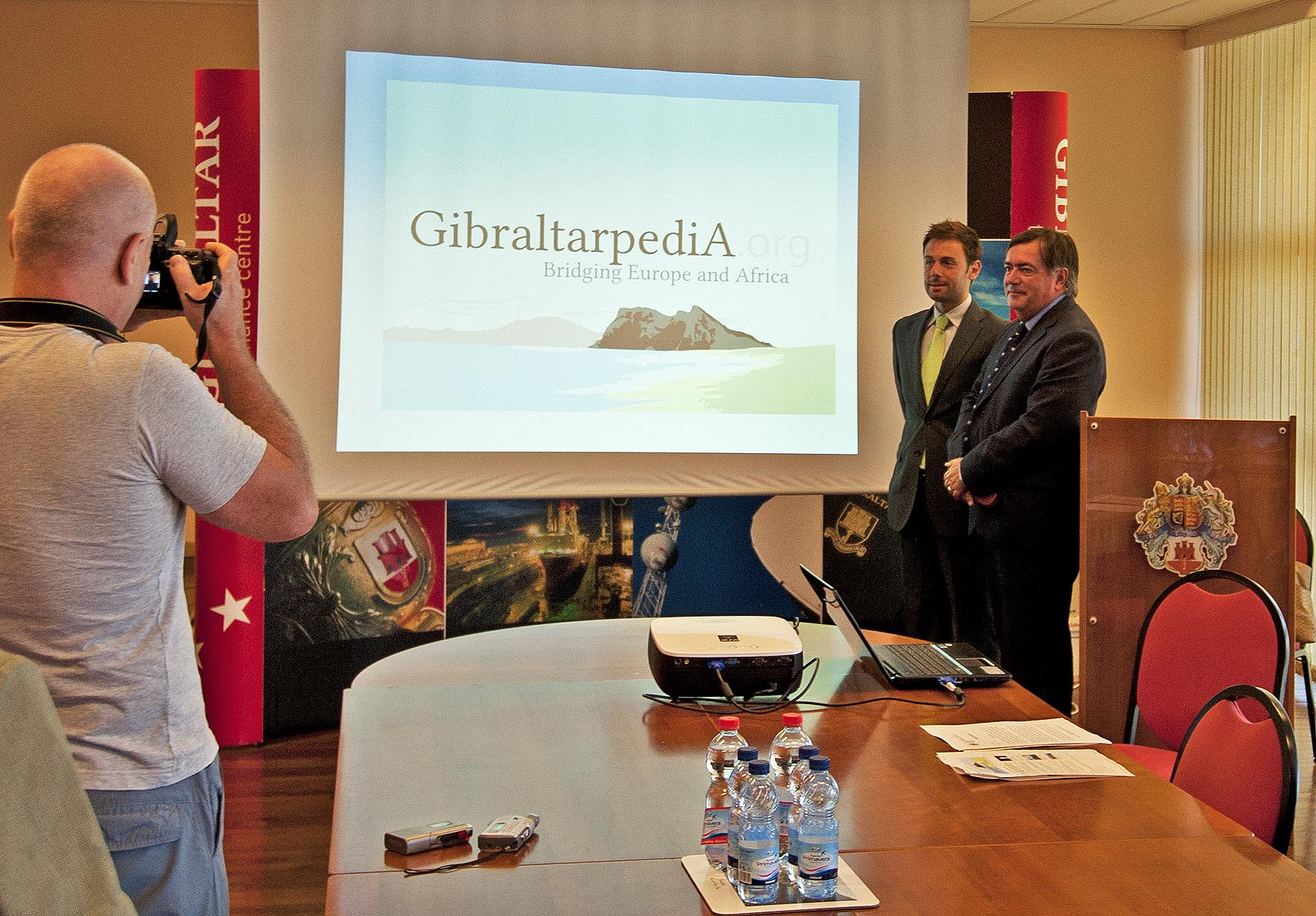
Gibraltar Minister of Tourism Neil Costa at Government of Gibraltar press conference on Gibraltarpedia, 18 July 2012

Gibraltarpedia is a project by the Government of Gibraltar, a British Overseas Territory in the south of the Iberian Peninsula, to improve coverage of Gibraltar-related topics on Wikipedia. It builds on Monmouthpedia, an earlier project along similar lines linking Wikipedia and the town of Monmouth in South Wales. The Gibraltarpedia project was announced in July 2012 by the Government of Gibraltar.

In September and October 2012, the project became the subject of a public controversy concerning the role of Gibraltar's tourism board in the project, allegations that the project was being used to promote the tourism board's interests, and allegations of conflicts of interest arising out of a paid consultancy agreement between the Government of Gibraltar and a trustee of Wikimedia UK.

== Project ==
=== Scope and structure ===
According to Gibraltarpedia's website, the project "aims to cover every single notable place, person, artefact, plant and animal in Gibraltar in as many languages as possible." Its scope also extends to the Strait of Gibraltar, the Spanish municipalities along the coast of the Bay of Gibraltar, the northernmost coast of Morocco and the Spanish town of Ceuta on the African coast opposite Gibraltar. It is structured as a WikiProject, involving a collaboration that includes volunteer editors, the Government of Gibraltar, the Gibraltar Tourism Board, the Gibraltar Museum, and Roger Bamkin, a former trustee of Wikimedia UK.

=== Formation ===
The Gibraltarpedia project was announced in July 2012 by the Government of Gibraltar. The idea for Gibraltarpedia originated with Tyson Lee Holmes, a Gibraltarian who contributes to Wikipedia. Holmes read about Monmouthpedia and believed Gibraltar could benefit from a similar project. Holmes contacted Stewart Finlayson of the Gibraltar Museum, and Finlayson then contacted representatives of Wikimedia UK. The organisers of Monmouthpedia were invited to Gibraltar to discuss proposals.

The Government of Gibraltar viewed Gibraltarpedia as a means to promote tourism, and the Gibraltar Tourist Board played a key role in the project's formation. Gibraltar's Minister for Tourism, Neil Costa, told a Welsh newspaper, "We as a Government have always said we need to be responsive and be able to seize opportunities as and when they arrive." Costa arranged meetings in Gibraltar for people from Wikipedia, which included tours of historical sites by staff from the Gibraltar Museum.

The Government initially had concerns about the fact that Wikipedia editors who "did not have Gibraltar's best interest at heart may write untrue or negative articles." Those concerns were reportedly allayed by assurances from Wikimedia UK. A government official told the Gibraltar Chronicle:

The people from Wikipedia UK have guaranteed to us that this has an element of self-regulation and we want to encourage many local volunteers to keep an eye on what is going on, and if things go on that is [sic] nasty, then it is very easy for them to go back to the earlier page in seconds.

In June 2012, the Government of Gibraltar signed a letter of intent with Roger Bamkin, a co-creator of Monmouthpedia and a director of Wikimedia UK, and with John Cummings, a Wikipedia editor. Bamkin provided consultancy advice on the production of QR codes and training for project contributors. He told the Western Mail in July 2012 that he selected Gibraltar as his next project "after being flooded with invitations from places around the world hoping to be the second Wikipedia town."

=== Training workshops ===
Workshops to facilitate contributions to Wikipedia and, more specifically, Gibraltarpedia were scheduled in Gibraltar in late July 2012. Tyson Lee Holmes, coordinator of Gibraltarpedia, told the Gibraltar Broadcasting Corporation that the project hoped "to get people interested in editing pages on, among other things, historical periods, prominent buildings, biographies." In September 2012, the BBC reported that volunteers had been producing "up to 20 articles a day in various languages," and that Roger Bamkin was in Gibraltar for the week "seeking more people to contribute photos, maps and information on the territory's history."

=== Plans to use QR codes ===
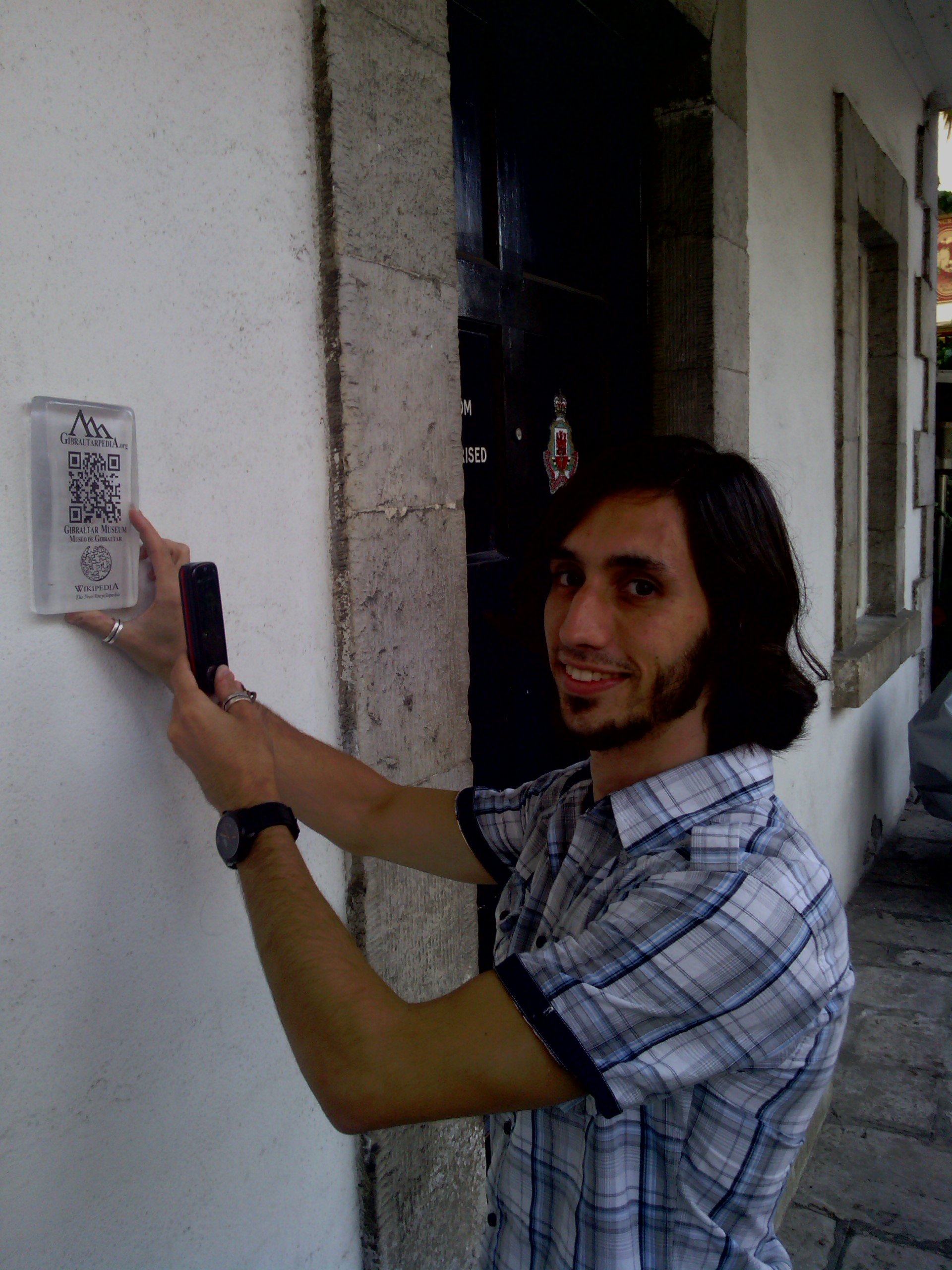
Gibraltarpedia coordinator Tyson Lee Holmes with a trial plaque containing a QR code

The project had planned to use QRpedia QR codes (quick response codes) to provide multilingual smartphone access to Wikipedia articles covering notable subjects in Gibraltar. Once implemented, the codes were intended to allow visitors to retrieve Wikipedia articles in their default languages by using their smartphones to read the QR codes. The project planned to install plaques with the QR codes on significant buildings in Gibraltar. Roger Bamkin described the system as "tap technology," allowing visitors to "tap" QR codes with a cellular phone.

== Controversy ==
=== Allegations of conflicts of interest ===
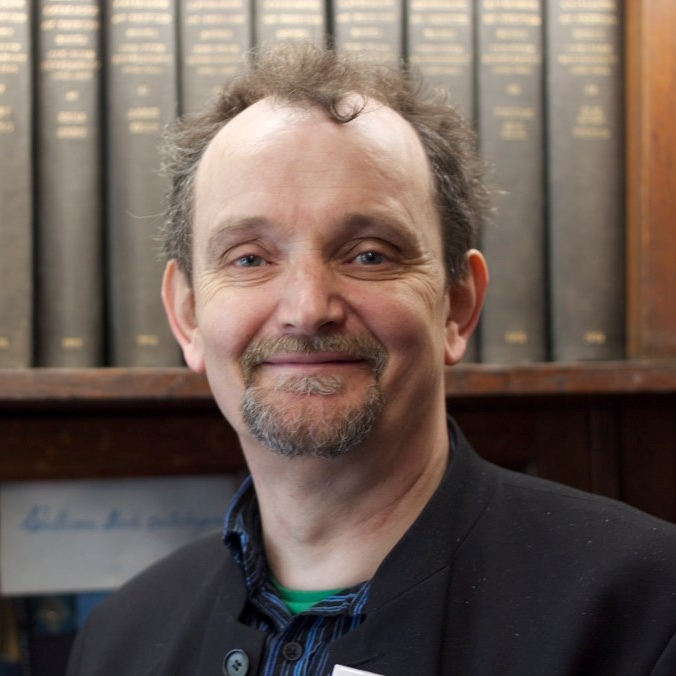
Roger Bamkin at WikiConference UK 2012

The key element of controversy was over Roger Bamkin's paid consultancy relationship with the Government of Gibraltar, resulting in critical coverage in many media outlets. Specifically, payment of an editor to promote specific content was viewed as controversial. Fears were raised that the incentive to raise revenue for Gibraltar's tourism sector (a large portion of its economy) could skew the neutrality of editing efforts. The activities of Bamkin within Wikipedia, such as submitting suggestions for Wikipedia's main page 'Did You Know' feature (featured seventeen times in August 2012), were described in media reports as to promote "his client's project".

Slate magazine summarized the concerns of some as follows:

Once Wikipedia becomes a pay-to-play platform in any sense, it's no longer a balanced, universal wellspring of information. It's just another commercial website, with a particularly insidious brand of camouflaged advertising. Any company with a sly enough PR person could promote ostensibly fascinating facts about its products. If the 'Did You Know?' page was suddenly dominated by trivia about Gap or Mars Bars, many readers would quickly smell a rat, but there are numerous PR professionals who represent subtler brands and causes.

Noting that the controversy was revealed from within by Wikipedia editors, Forbes said that "the incident reinforces the power of Wikipedia’s community to monitor itself and self-discipline violations of its norms." Brandchannel reported on the controversy and noted that payment of money to Wikipedia editors represented "the greatest threat the [Wikipedia] brand has seen to date." British web site The Register reported on concerns that the "scandal involving a close-knit group of friends and business associates who run Wikimedia UK may imperil its charitable status."

=== Responses to the controversy ===
Various media outlets reported on the response of Jimmy Wales to the controversy. Wales noted: "It is wildly inappropriate for a board member of a chapter, or anyone else in an official role of any kind in a charity associated with Wikipedia, to take payment from customers in exchange for securing favorable placement on the front page of Wikipedia or anywhere else."

In his declaration of interest to Wikimedia UK, Bamkin denied engaging in any paid editing. Bamkin noted:

At the end of June Roger signed a contract with the Government of Gibraltar. There is no known COI [conflict of interest] as WMUK [Wikimedia UK] does not have a relationship with this Government but it is hoped that one may develop. ... The contract includes the delivery of training and the creation of QRpedia plaques—there is no paid editing involved.

On 20 September 2012, Wikimedia UK announced Bamkin had stepped down as a trustee. Chris Keating, the Chair of Wikimedia UK, said: "Roger has always conducted himself with openness and honesty with regards to his business interests ... However we have reached the decision together that it is best if Roger steps back from the Board, and thus the Board has accepted his resignation."

On 21 September 2012, the Gibraltar Chronicle reported a Gibraltar Government spokesman as saying that there was no basis for the claim that it had paid Bamkin to raise the profile of articles about Gibraltar. The spokesman noted that Bamkin continued to provide advice on the production of QR codes and training for volunteer contributors to "Gibraltar's Wikipedia site" [sic]. The Chronicle also noted that the Government "aims to set up Gibraltar's own Wikipedia site"[sic] and identified Bamkin as a person who "played a prominent role" in the development of Wikipedia.

Also on 21 September 2012, Wikimedia UK issued a press release stating that it had no formal ties with Gibraltarpedia. While expressing a desire to provide formal support to Gibraltarpedia if a memorandum of understanding could be reached with the Government of Gibraltar "setting out shared aims and objectives," the release stated that the charity had not funded the project and noted that "[its] only material involvement [had] been to supply some 'how to edit Wikipedia' leaflets, which is the kind of thing [it] would do for any institution."

=== Investigation requested by Wikimedia Foundation ===
On 2 October 2012, The Daily Telegraph reported that, as a result of the Gibraltarpedia controversy, Wikimedia UK had been "barred from processing some donations" and faced "an investigation over alleged conflicts of interest." The Wikimedia Foundation's vice chair stated that the investigation was sparked by "several (highly) irregular activities", but subsequently clarified that he meant "unusual enough to warrant further review" rather than improper. On 7 February 2013, the report was released, and identified Gibraltarpedia as one of the incidents that led to the review. Among the findings was that WMUK was unable to appropriately handle such conflicts of interest, and that Bamkin's acceptance of consultancy fees provided an opportunity for the charity's reputation to be damaged.

=== Restrictions ===
Jimmy Wales suggested a five-year moratorium on Gibraltar-related content appearing on Wikipedia's main page, but the idea was rejected by the Wikipedia community, which instead created guidelines limiting how frequently Gibraltar topics could appear on Wikipedia's main page, including restricting the number of articles to one per day and requiring two reviewers to check for conflict-of-interest issues or promotionalism. The restrictions were lifted in September 2013.
