= Wikimedia UK =

Charity and chapter of the Wikimedia movement

- Founded: November 2008; 18 years ago
- Type: Educational charity
- Registration no.: Company registration: 6741827; Charity Commission: 1144513
- Purpose: Wikimedia Foundation
- Location: British Library
- Region served: United Kingdom
- Method: Public outreach
- Key people: Lucy Yu (Chair Elect of the Board); Lucy Crompton-Reid (Chief Executive)
- Revenue: £734,671 (2019/20)
- Employees: 14
- Website: wikimedia.org.uk
- Formerly called: Wiki UK Limited

Wikimedia UK (WMUK), also known as Wikimedia United Kingdom, is a registered charity established to support volunteers in the United Kingdom who work on Wikimedia projects such as Wikipedia. As such, it is a Wikimedia chapter approved by the Wikimedia Foundation (WMF), which owns and hosts those projects.

Wikimedia UK started out as Wiki Educational Resources Limited (WER), but due to financial difficulties and other problems the organisation dissolved, and was replaced by Wiki UK Limited. After its first attempt to gain charitable status in 2009 failed, the group subsequently made changes to its charter in order to satisfy the charity criteria, and was recognised as a registered charity in England and Wales in 2011. During the same year, WMUK added full-time staff and established a permanent office in London, England.

The chapter has several collaborations with museums and other institutions, and has organised events for volunteers aimed at adding content to Foundation projects. In its early years, several of the organisation's board members were involved in controversies related to their contributions to Wikipedia, including claims that the Gibraltarpedia collaboration organised by a trustee was being used for promotional purposes.

== History ==
The first iteration of Wikimedia UK (WMUK) was founded as Wiki Educational Resources Limited (WER) and was incorporated on 14 February 2006, with Alison Wheeler serving as chair of the board and chief executive officer of WER. WER faced several problems during its time as a chapter organisation that included difficulty in its financing efforts and in its relationship with the Wikimedia Foundation (WMF). Its persistent financial difficulties left the organisation with debts it was unable to pay, and on 28 August 2008 Wheeler announced on the WMUK mailing list that she was planning to call an Extraordinary General Meeting to decide on a proposal to dissolve the group. Wiki Educational Resources formally dissolved on 31 March 2009.

Wiki UK Limited was incorporated as a private not-for-profit company under the Companies Act 2006 on 5 November 2008 and, after the WMF terminated recognition of its predecessor, the organisation was officially recognised as a chapter in January 2009. It applied for official recognition of charitable status to HM Revenue and Customs (HMRC) the same year, but was denied. HMRC argued that WMUK's purpose of freely disseminating information through Wikipedia would not qualify as charitable unless it included teaching and education as part of its activities. Andrew Turvey, secretary of the WMUK, responded to the ruling by pledging to seek legal advice before appealing the decision. Following the rejection of its registration-application by HMRC, Wikimedia UK amended its constitution by adopting new Articles of Association derived from an approved model for charitable status and applied to the Charity Commission for registration as a charity, which was granted in November 2011 once WMUK had met the commission's minimum income requirement of £5,000. The Charity Commission had initially rejected WMUK's application as an educational charity, but ultimately was able with a little help from WMUK's legal advisers to register it as a library-resource charity.

Jimmy Wales gave a public lecture at a celebration of Wikipedia's 10th anniversary in Bristol, organised by Wikimedia UK and other partners.

A year later, Wikimedia UK hosted the three-day Wikimedia Fundraising Summit in Bristol. Christopher Brown of Bristol 24-7 described this as the first time the group had "hosted an event of this importance to the global movement". The following January, WMUK organised a celebration of the 10th anniversary of Wikipedia's founding at University of Bristol, together with other groups such as the Bristol City Council and Bristol Festival of Ideas. Co-founder Jimmy Wales gave a public lecture at the celebration. During its 2011 annual conference, Wikimedia UK announced its plans to open a permanent office and hire full-time staff within a year.

During its efforts to establish a full-time staff, Wikimedia UK was assisted by several groups and individuals such as the president of Wikimedia Deutschland and prospect-us, a recruitment agency specialising in non-profits, who helped vet candidates for the position of CEO. After introducing the final three CEO candidates to the community at a London 'wikimeet' in September, WMUK announced on the 26th of that month that it had chosen Jon Davies, former CEO of Families Need Fathers, for the position.

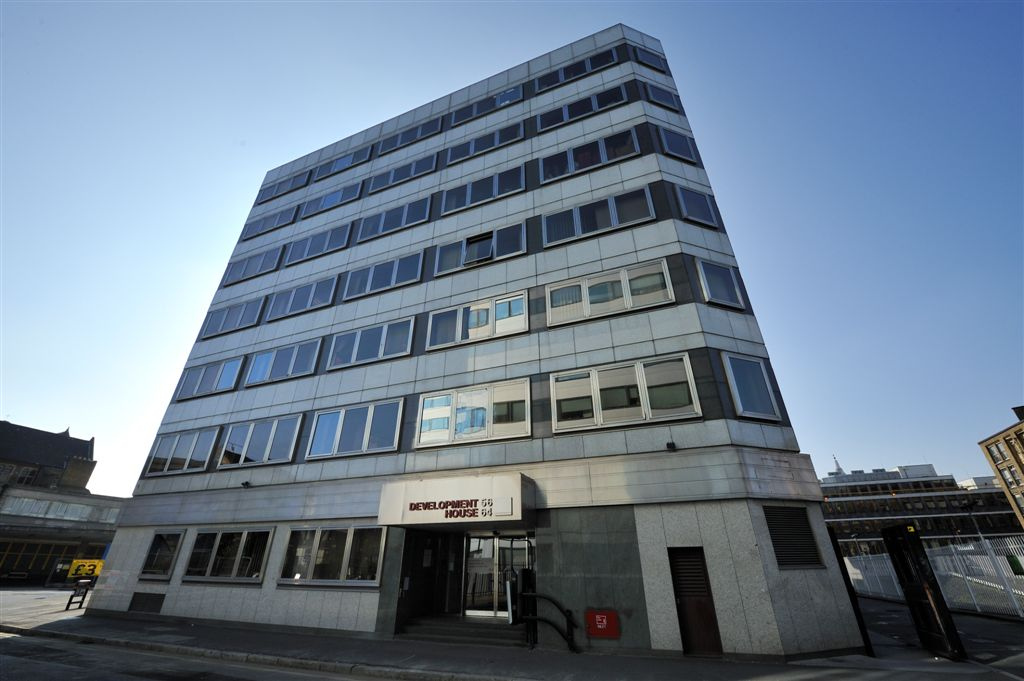
Wikimedia UK opened a permanent office on the 4th floor of Development House, in central London on 14 November 2011.

In a renewed effort to gain official recognition of charitable status, the board of WMUK had called an EGM to approve amended Objects and related charitable clauses in its Memorandum and Articles of Association pursuant to the advice of their legal team and the Charity Commission. At the meeting, the proposed amendment was passed by a vote of 49 to none. The Commission registered the company as a charity in November 2011, thereby allowing it to claim the Gift Aid tax incentive from HMRC on its donations from UK taxpayers. In its ruling, the Commission said that WMUK provided a "public resource" by supporting public access to information through Wikipedia. As it did not serve the charitable purposes specifically outlined in the 2006 Charities Act, the ruling referred to a provision of the act allowing for considerations based on case law. Jonathan Burchfield, a partner from the law firm that represented WMUK in its application, stated that the ruling was unprecedented in charity law. During the proceedings, the group had to prove to the Commission that there were tight controls over Wikipedia content to prevent abuse. Following the ruling, Wikimedia UK stated it would have a fundraising effort aimed at raising a million pounds to support Foundation projects. The chapter opened its new offices in central London on 14 November, changing its registered address from its previous location in Nottingham.

At its 2012 annual conference on 12 May, public relations experts gave a presentation on their efforts to collaborate with Wikimedia. Board member Steve Virgin described these efforts to work with the PR industry as "a positive first step" in establishing best practices to address concerns about the industry's work and conflict of interest editing on Wikipedia. In response to the controversy surrounding Gibraltarpedia, the Wikimedia Foundation announced that it was taking control of UK-based donations to the organisation and was appointing an independent investigator to inquire into WMUK's governance standards and processes. The review of WMUK's governance, jointly commissioned by the Wikimedia Foundation and WMUK in October 2012, was carried out by Compass Partnership. The report, released on 7 February 2013, found that the charity's reputation was damaged, and that trustees' conflicts of interest were poorly managed.

== Activities ==
Wikimedia UK has organised or supported many volunteer efforts to contribute to Foundation projects. One such effort was a month-long competition in February 2010 called 'Britain Loves Wikipedia' aimed at increasing the amount of freely licensed images available for use on Wikimedia Commons and Wikipedia. Participants photographed exhibits at participating museums in order to win cash and other prizes. WMUK has sponsored similar events since then, as well as 'edit-a-thons' in order to generate content for Foundation projects.

The organisation has collaborations with other institutions such as The National Archives and the British Museum, with event attendees given tours of the institutions so that content can be added to Wikipedia and its sister sites. Wikimedia UK has also worked with the Herbert Art Gallery and Museum in Coventry.

Wikimedia UK also operates QRpedia, which uses QR codes in museums, archives, and other venues, so that people viewing exhibits and collections can instantly see related Wikipedia content on mobile devices, in their preferred language, where available. Rights in QRpedia are owned by Cultural Outreach Limited, a wholly owned subsidiary of WMUK. WMUK pledged in 2012 that it would provide support to a six-month programme establishing a full-time paid Wikipedian in Residence position at the British Library, the longest-lasting position of its kind. Its efforts have included support for the Monmouthpedia and Gibraltarpedia projects.

== Controversies ==
After obtaining charitable status, Wikimedia UK was exposed to controversies that have received international attention.

=== Chairman resigns ===
One such case concerned the group's previous chair, Ashley van Haeften. In July 2012, Wikipedia's Arbitration Committee ruled that he had violated policies regarding use of multiple accounts and had behaved in an uncivil manner when faced with concerns about sexually explicit material. Although the Committee stated that van Haeften had been subjected to harassment, it also found that he had not been separating harassment from legitimate criticism. The case resulted in him being banned from contributing to the English Wikipedia for an indefinite period. Despite the results of the case, Wikimedia UK's board supported van Haeften remaining in his position as chair and praised his work with the group. The board's decision was met with criticism from some members of the organisation, who proposed an extraordinary general meeting that would discuss removing him from the board. CEO Jon Davies subsequently announced on 2 August 2012 that van Haeften was resigning from his position as chair to avoid creating division within the organisation, but he retained his position as a board member and remained chair of the Wikimedia Chapters Association. Chris Keating was subsequently elected to replace him as chairman of the board.

=== Gibraltarpedia ===
Another member of Wikimedia UK's board of trustees, Roger Bamkin, was exposed to controversy in 2012 due to his involvement with Gibraltarpedia. During the month of August, material about Gibraltar appeared on the front page of Wikipedia 17 times in the "Did you know..." section as a result of the work on Gibraltarpedia. In several instances, Bamkin reviewed these entries and, as he was receiving payment from the government of Gibraltar in connection with his work on Gibraltarpedia, editors raised concerns that the project was using Wikipedia's front page to promote the territory of Gibraltar in exchange for financial compensation. Gibraltar's government later stated on 21 September that their contract with Bamkin did not involve him being paid for work on Wikipedia but was limited to providing advice on the QR codes and training volunteers.

Bamkin's involvement with Wikimedia UK as a board member while performing work on the project prompted further concerns about his position with the group. Wikipedia co-founder Jimmy Wales stated on 17 September that, if the claims about paid editing were well-founded, it was inappropriate for Bamkin to sit on the board of Wikimedia UK given its charitable status. Wales then suggested he resign from the board of the organisation or end his work with the government of Gibraltar. On 20 September, Bamkin resigned from the board of Wikimedia UK following a mutual decision by the board supporting the move in response to the concerns about Gibraltarpedia.

The level of WMUK's participation was also brought into question regarding the situation with Gibraltarpedia. While the organisation does not prohibit paid editing, its support of Bamkin's activities was criticised as potentially inconsistent with its charitable status. In a press release following his resignation, the organisation stated that it had provided minimal material support for the effort, that Bamkin had disclosed his commercial interests, and that he had not been involved in the group's decisions regarding the project.

=== Grant Shapps ===
In April 2015, a WMUK employee blocked an account on English Wikipedia he claimed was associated with then Chairman of the Conservative Party Grant Shapps. The employee, a LibDem activist, did so after discussing the accusations with The Guardian newspaper using his WMUK email. English Wikipedia's Arbitration Committee censured the editor for his actions, claiming there was "no significant evidence" linking the blocked account to Shapps. In July Shapps filed a Data Protection Act request, asking for WMUK communications concerning him. WMUK sent Shapps 80 pages of data, but claimed that most emails about the incident had been "deleted in the normal course of business". Shapps described the deletion as "highly suspect". In one email released, a member of the WMUK board states "We should be glad that Shapps has a pretty safe seat, because if he lost his seat, we would be open to the accusation that the charity had acted in a partisan manner during an election period". D'Arcy Myers, then interim Chief Executive of WMUK, refused to apologise to Shapps, stating that the charity was "not involved" in the controversy.

== Board of trustees ==
The current Board of Trustees for Wikimedia UK can be found on their site.
