= Amarapedia =

Spanish internet project

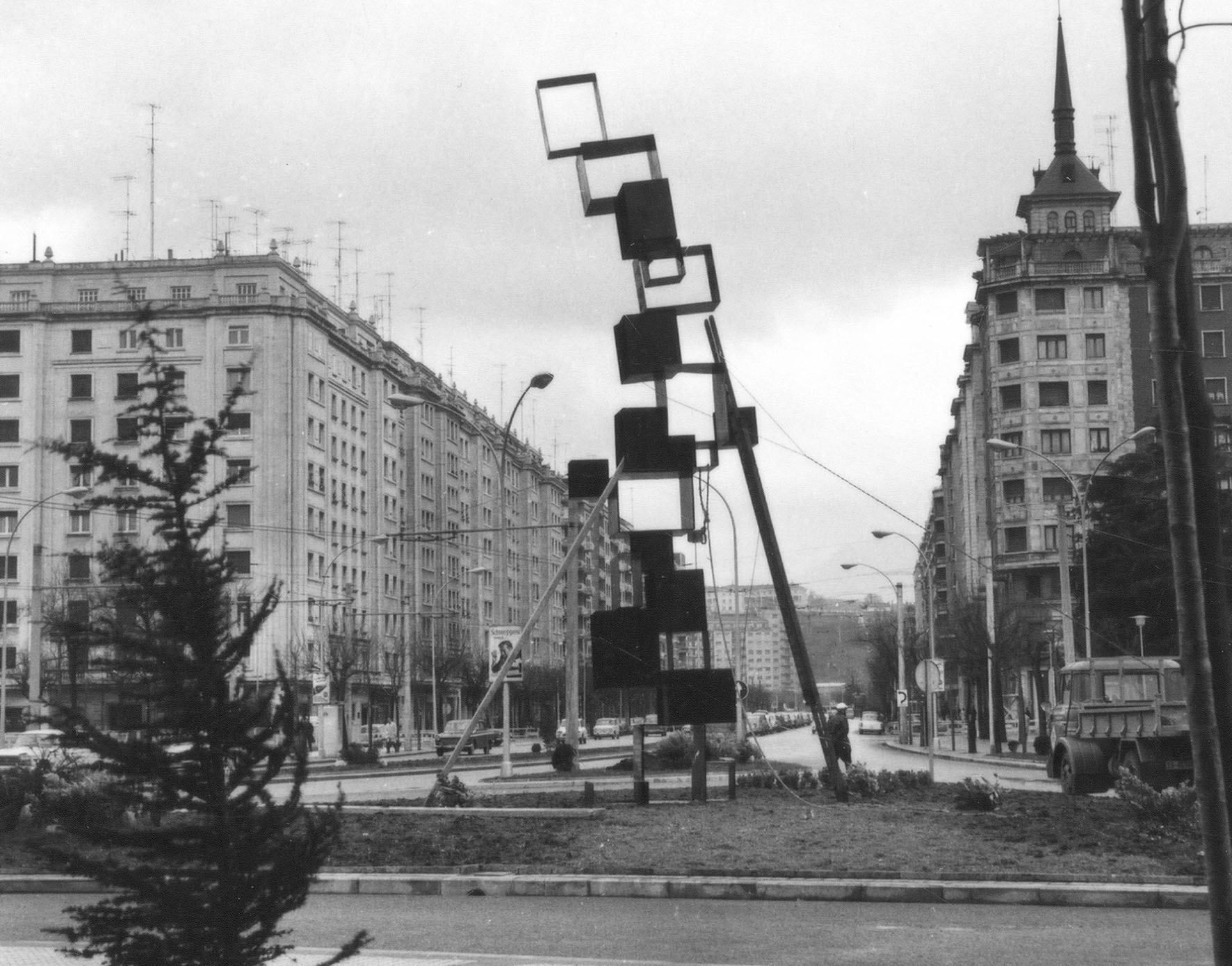
Building Amara together

Amarapedia is a collaborative project linking the quarter of Amara in San Sebastián, Spain, with the online encyclopaedia Wikipedia. It is focused on the facilities of local information system, covering subjects such as places, buildings, facilities, and streets. Amarapedia is inspired by the Welsh experience of Monmouthpedia and it was a pilot project for future larger-scale projects that took place in the city of San Sebastián in 2016, when the city was the European Capital of Culture.

== Inception ==
The idea of Amarapedia was conceived by active cultural members and Wikipedians of San Sebastián. The initial goal is to encourage the citizens' involvement in an inclusive way through articles about the quarter of Amara and its neighborhood. This is a continuation of the work done with associations of the neighbourhood within Amarauna project (this word means "net" in the Basque language), and is one of the starting points of the citywide Donostiapedia project.

Amarapedia was developed during 2015, and was featured in the local Olatu Talka cultural festival on 30 May of that year, in Mentxu Gal square in Amara. The intention is to involve the citizens of San Sebastián in the writing of as many articles as possible in Basque, which will be translated into Spanish afterwards, until December 2015. Free courses on editing Wikipedia have been provided in the locality. Finally, 11 articles will be selected and published as Amarapedia's Essentials, which will be translated into many languages.

== Main aims ==
1. To expand the information of the quarter: sharing knowledge and promoting local identity.
2. To promote Wikipedia in the Basque language.
3. To support an active community and to empower civic participation.
4. To provide a thrilling pilot experience for the year 2016.
5. To engage local associations and encourage working together.

== QR technology ==
The Amarapedia project, like Monmouthpedia, will make use of QR technology: neighbours and visitors will be able to access Amarapedia articles using QR codes. Readers will see the articles in their own language, determined by the configuration of their smartphones; and visually impaired people will be able to listen to the articles using the accessibility features of their smartphones. Additionally, it will be possible for anyone to improve, update and translate the articles due to the collaborative nature of Wikipedia.

== Award ==
For his work on developing the Amarapedia project, Xabier Cañas received a prize in the Princess of Asturias Awards, and attended the awards ceremony in Oviedo in October 2015.

== See also ==
- QRpedia
