= Monmouthshire Libraries =

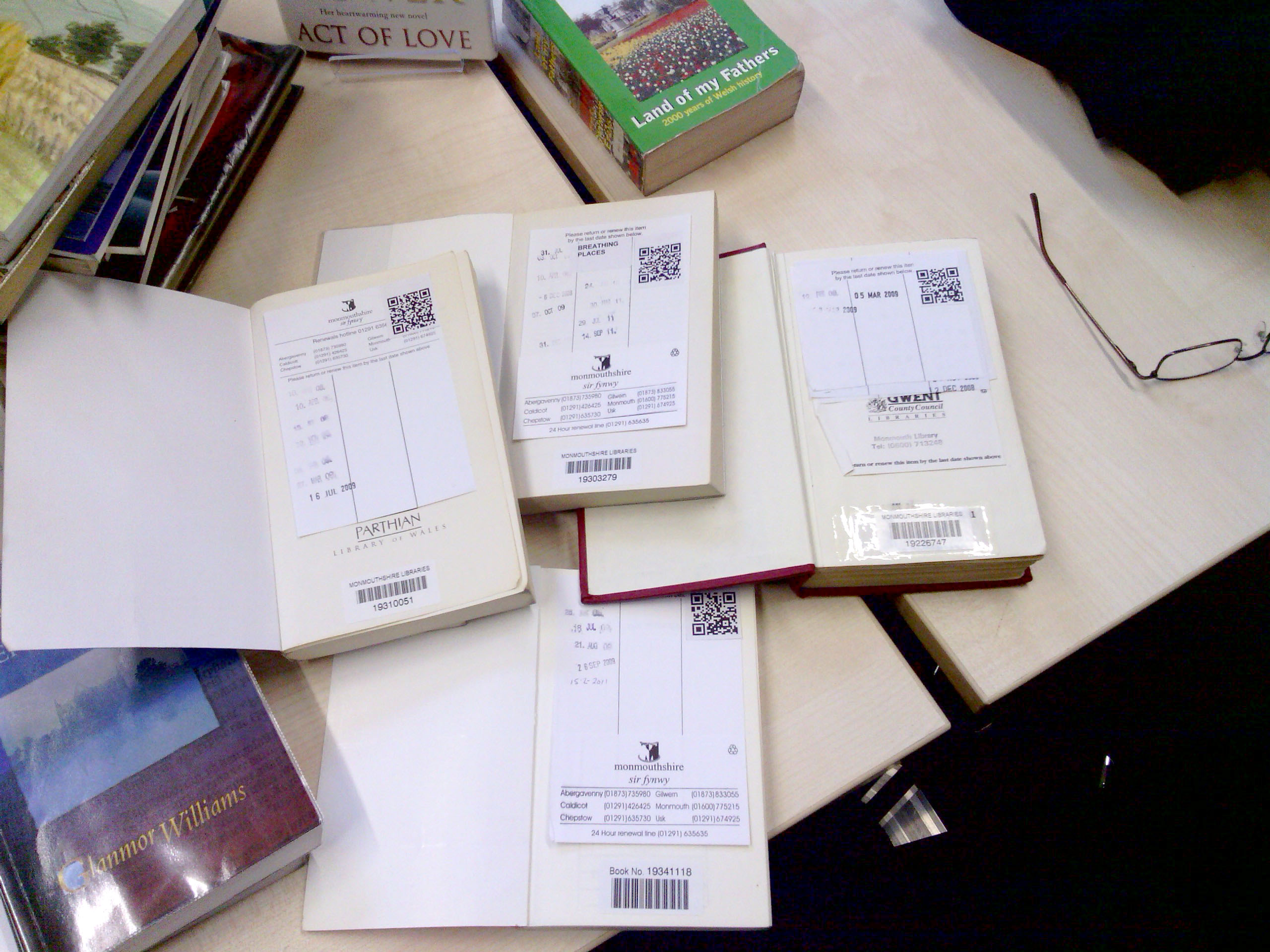
QR codes in books at Monmouth Library

Monmouthshire Libraries are a collection of six libraries in Monmouthshire, Wales owned by Monmouthshire County Council. The libraries are located in Abergavenny Town Hall, (the former library, a Grade II listed Carnegie Library, closed in 2015), Gilwern, Monmouth (located in The Rolls Hall), Usk, Caldicot and Chepstow.

In the context of the Monmouthpedia project, an initiative designed equip the town with hundreds of links to Wikipedia for smart-phone users, Monmouth Library has become the first library in the world to add QR codes to books. Users with smart phones can now instantly find Wikipedia articles on a book and its author. Priority has been given to local literature and Welsh titles but recent acquisitions on the Queen's Jubilee and the Olympics have also been QR coded.

In addition to the six libraries in Monmouthshire, a mobile library service called Reaching Out is available.
