= Monmouthpedia =

Collaborative project in Wales

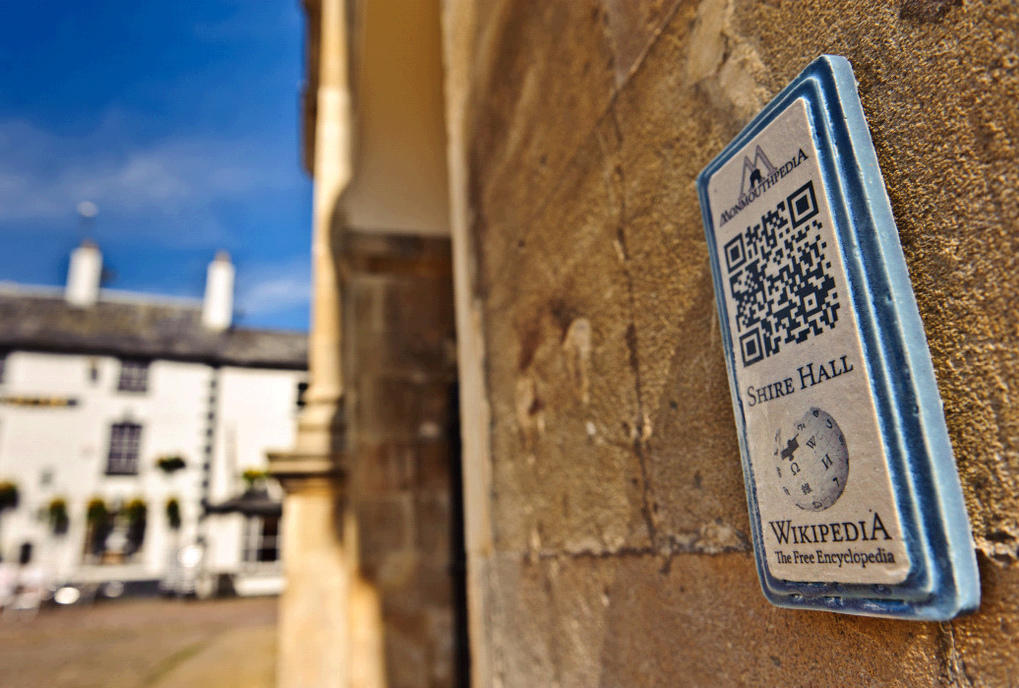
- Plaque on Shire Hall, its QR code linking to the building's Wikipedia article
- Commercial?: No
- Location: Monmouth, Wales
- Key people: John Cummings; Roger Bamkin
- Launched: 19 May 2012; 14 years ago
- Website: en.wikipedia.org/wiki/Wikipedia:GLAM/MonmouthpediA

Introductory video to the project (in English, with French subtitles)

Monmouthpedia (styled as MonmouthpediA) is a collaborative project linking the online encyclopaedia Wikipedia and the town of Monmouth in Wales.

The project, launched in 2012, uses QRpedia QR codes to provide multilingual smart phone access to Wikipedia articles covering notable subjects in Monmouth, such as places, people, artefacts, flora and fauna. It was formally launched on 19 May 2012. Monmouth has been described as the "world's first Wikipedia town" and the "world's first Wikitown project". The project was awarded the "Excellence in Marketing" award at the Monmouthshire Business Awards.

== Inception ==
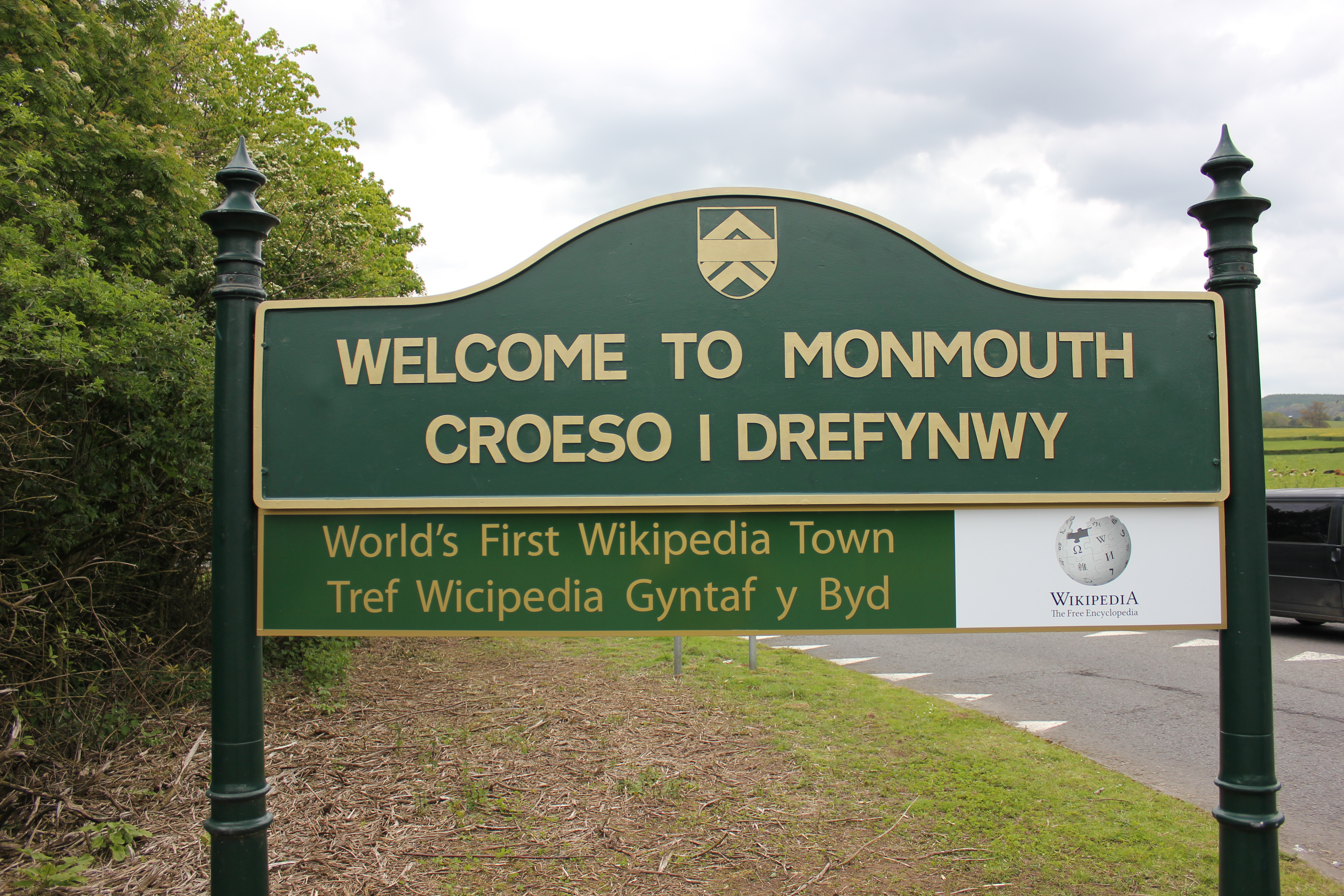
Official Monmouthpedia signage naming it the "world's first Wikipedia town"

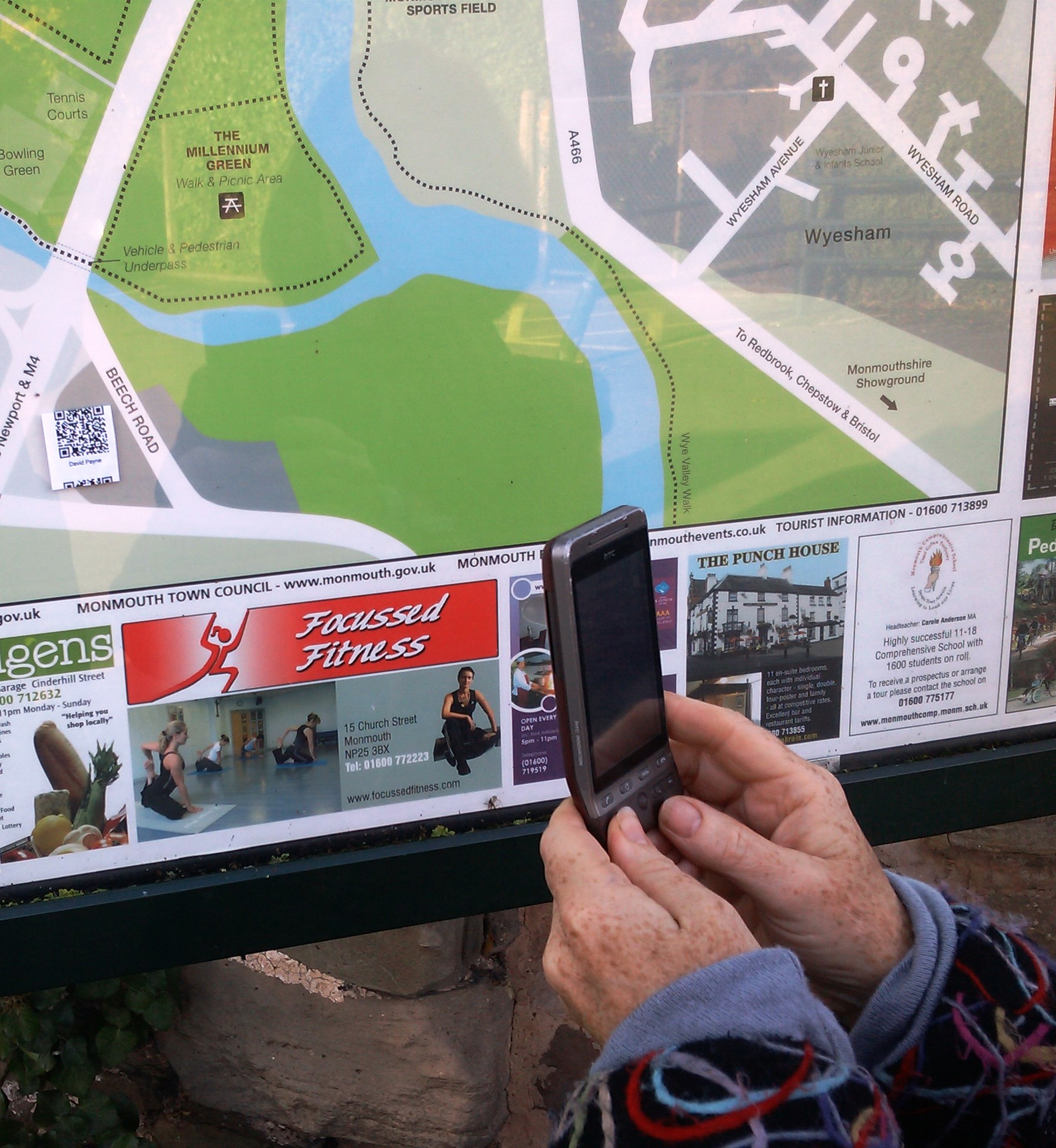
Visitors can scan QR codes to learn more about aspects of the town

The idea of Monmouthpedia was conceived in late 2011 by John Cummings, a resident of Monmouth. Cummings attended a TEDx event in Bristol which discussed the QRpedia project in use at Derby Museum and Art Gallery. Cummings founded the project with chair of Wikimedia UK, Roger Bamkin, who co-founded QRpedia. The project was subsequently supported by Monmouthshire County Council, and the council-owned Shire Hall later announced plans to instate a Wikipedian-in-Residence and introduce sessions to help visitors with contributions to the project.

Monmouthpedia's initial goal was to have 1,000 QR codes by April 2012, with each article having a corresponding ceramic plaque emblazoned with a code. By May, the project's home page reported 712 new and improved articles in 25 different languages. For non-English speakers, where available, articles in other languages are automatically displayed in the language of the user on the basis of the phone's language configuration. At project launch, some 500 articles in other languages were available thanks to the collaboration of editors abroad. In addition to this, the project covers over 250 pre-existing entries on Monmouth-related topics. In the same period, over 1,000 photographs were uploaded.

One of the issues that Monmouth faced in making the project a success was that there was poor 3G mobile coverage. To help with this, wireless (Wi-Fi) broadband was provided by local ISP Spectrum Internet in the high street and at most QR code plaque locations.

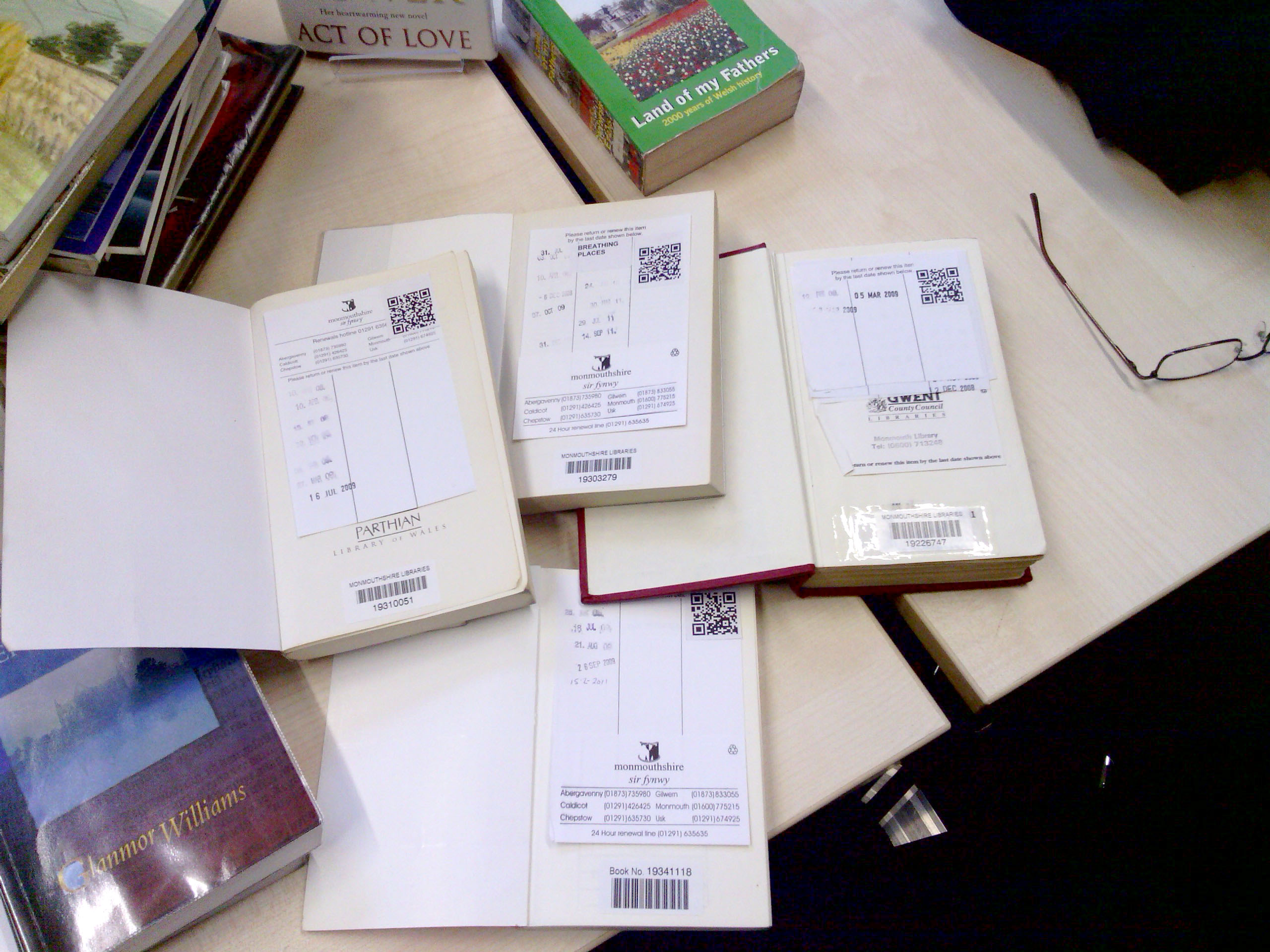
QR codes in library books

Monmouth Library became the first library in the world to add QR codes to books, allowing users with smart phones to instantly access Wikipedia articles on each book and its author. Priority has been given to local literature and Welsh titles but more recent acquisitions on the Queen's Jubilee and the 2012 Olympics were also QR coded.

== Reception ==
Glyn Moody, writing for Techdirt, questioned whether Monmouthpedia was the future of Wikipedia. He described the project as creating "a kind of fractal Wikipedia" likening it to the 2010 film Inception, potentially enabling "[a] Wikipedia within a Wikipedia within a Wikipedia." Within days of the launch, the initiative had led to widespread interest. A spokesman for Wikimedia UK reported that the project page had been viewed 10,000 times. They also reported there had been inquiries from towns in Norway, England, France, Scotland, and the US state of Texas. One test of success will however be the project's ability to attract more tourists to the town. The initiative soon attracted interest from Gibraltar where the Gibraltarpedia project was launched on 13 July.

Jimmy Wales, the co-founder of Wikipedia, was enthusiastic about the initiative: "Bringing a whole town to life on Wikipedia is something new and is a testament to the forward-thinking people of Monmouth, all of the volunteers and the Wikimedia UK team. I'm looking forward to seeing other towns and cities doing the same thing."

Monmouthshire County Council announced in July 2012 that it was planning to extend the initiative to other parts of the authority's area, starting with Chepstow and Raglan.

Monmouthpedia was awarded the "Excellence in Marketing" award at the Monmouthshire Business Awards in October 2012. Wynndel Property Management, developers of new housing at "Severn Quay" in Chepstow and sponsor of the award, praised Monmouthpedia on their website, noting that "Advertising value for Monmouth alone has been estimated at £2.12 million", and predicting that "Chepstow property, together with new developments in Chepstow and new developments in Monmouthshire, will also benefit" when a similar project starts for Chepstow.

== Wikimedia UK governance ==
On 7 February 2013, Monmouthpedia was cited as one of the conflicts of interest that prompted a governance review of Wikimedia UK (WMUK). The report found that WMUK was ineffective at handling such conflicts, and found that Roger Bamkin's acceptance of consultancy fees for Monmouthpedia provided an opportunity for WMUK's reputation to be damaged.

== See also ==
- Amarapedia
