= Skopje Zoo =

Skopje Zoo Зоолошка градина Скопје Kopshti zoologjik Shkup

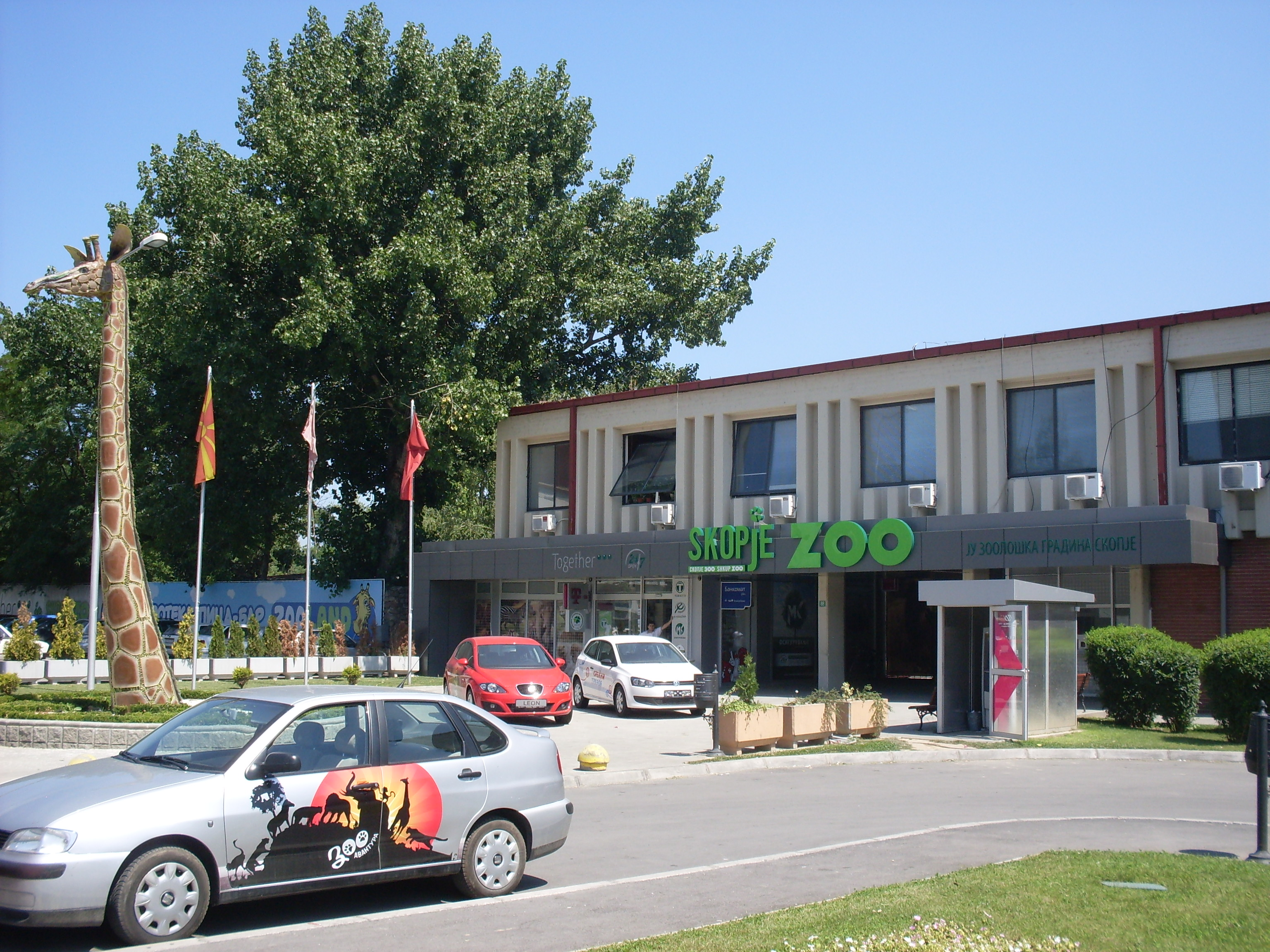
- Entrance to Skopje Zoo
- Interactive map of Skopje Zoo; Зоолошка градина Скопје; Kopshti zoologjik Shkup
- 42.007078°N 21.41687°E
- Date opened: 1926
- Location: City Park, Skopje, North Macedonia
- Land area: 12 ha (30 acres)
- No. of animals: 500
- No. of species: 85
- Website: www.zooskopje.com.mk

The Skopje Zoo (Macedonian: Зоолошка градина Скопје; Albanian: Kopshti zoologjik Shkup) is a 12-hectare (30-acre) zoo near City Park in Skopje, North Macedonia. It is home to 500 animals representing 85 species.

== History ==
The zoo was founded in 1926 by a three-member commission led by Stanko Karaman. When it opened, the zoo covered only 4 hectares (10 acres), and exhibited only a few animals which it had received as gifts. With a decision by the Skopje city council in 1965, and the new town zoning in 1966, the zoo was expanded to its current size.

Over the years the zoo received much criticism for the living conditions of its animals. The only elephant ever held by the zoo died at age 23 less than a year after being transferred from the Belgrade Zoo, and the chronically depressed lone Chimpanzee Koko was transferred to the AAP Primate Sanctuary in 2009.

However, in 2008 the City allocated 42 million denar in funds to improve the zoo, and the zoo started working with the European Association of Zoos and Aquaria (EAZA) to improve conditions and bring the zoo up to modern standards. By 2010, 18 new enclosures had been built, 85% of the older exhibits at the zoo had been renovated, and the zoo became an EAZA membership candidate.

On 19 October 2024, a case of bird flu of the H5N1 variant was detected in a deceased goose at a pond in the zoo, prompting the complex's closure for three weeks and the culling of several birds that also lived in the pond.

== The future ==
The zoo plans to build new enclosures for elephants and giraffes (financed by the city), as well as build a new chimpanzee enclosure so that Koko can return home.

== Gallery ==
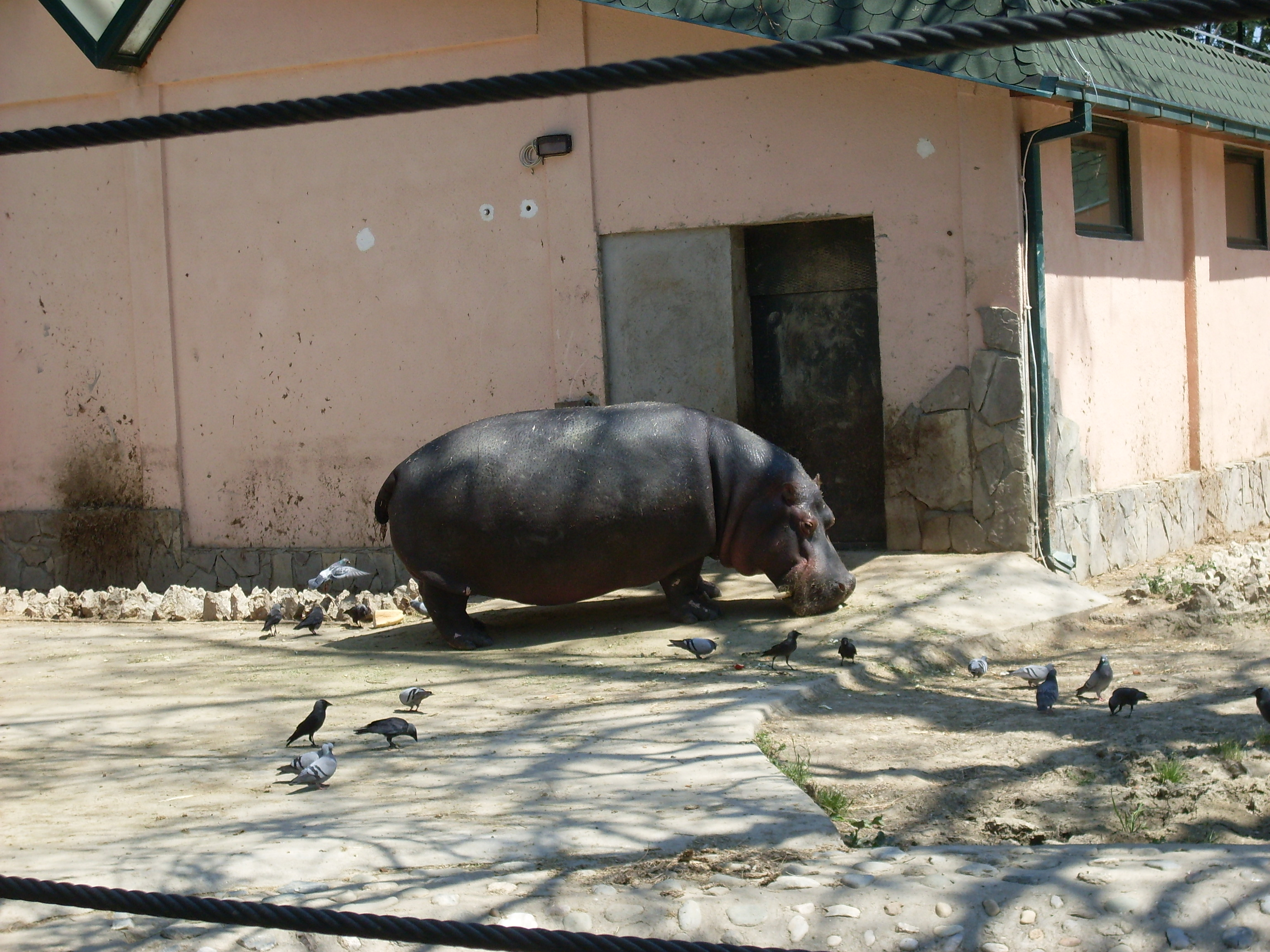
Hippopotamus

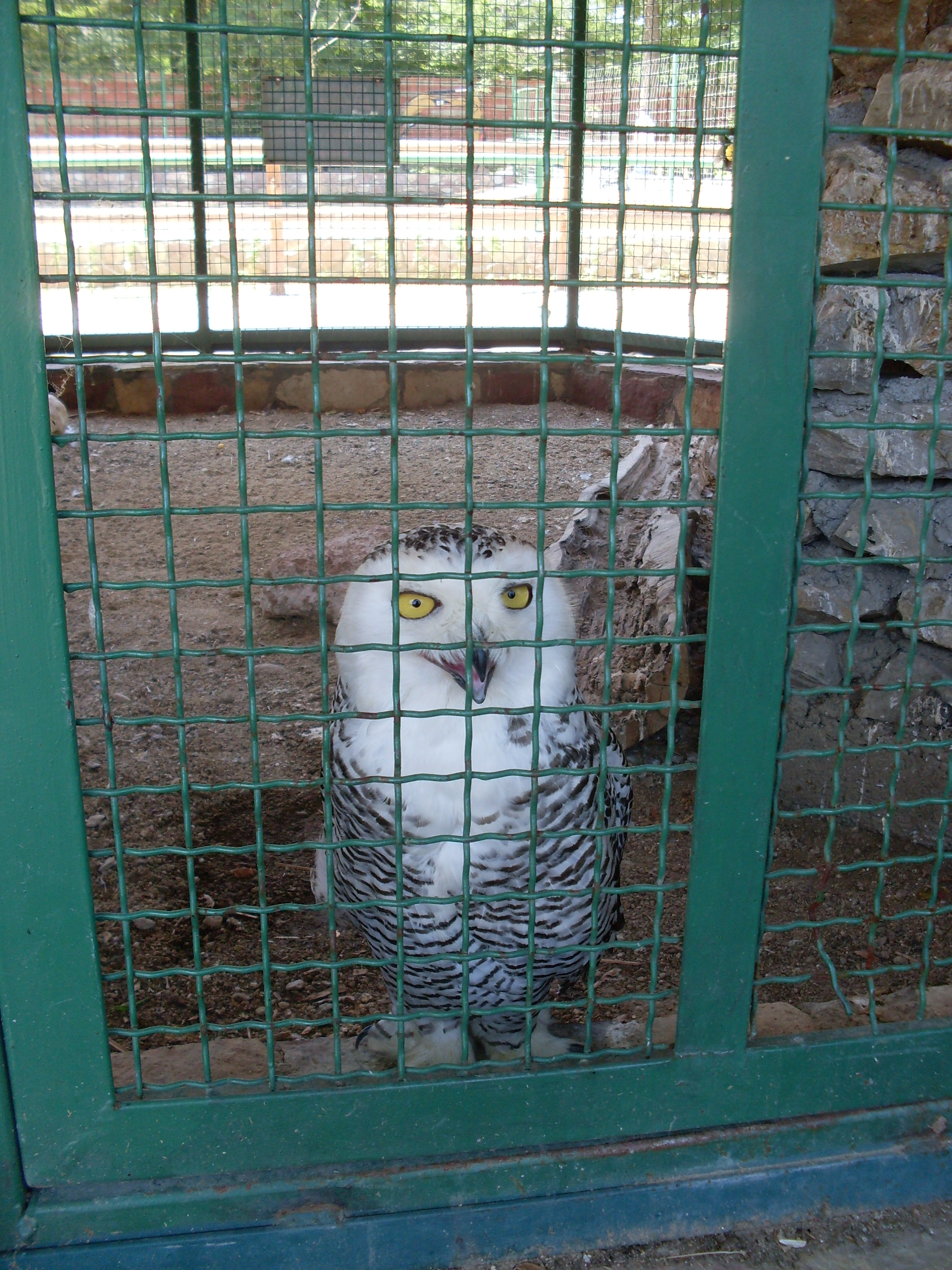
Snow owl

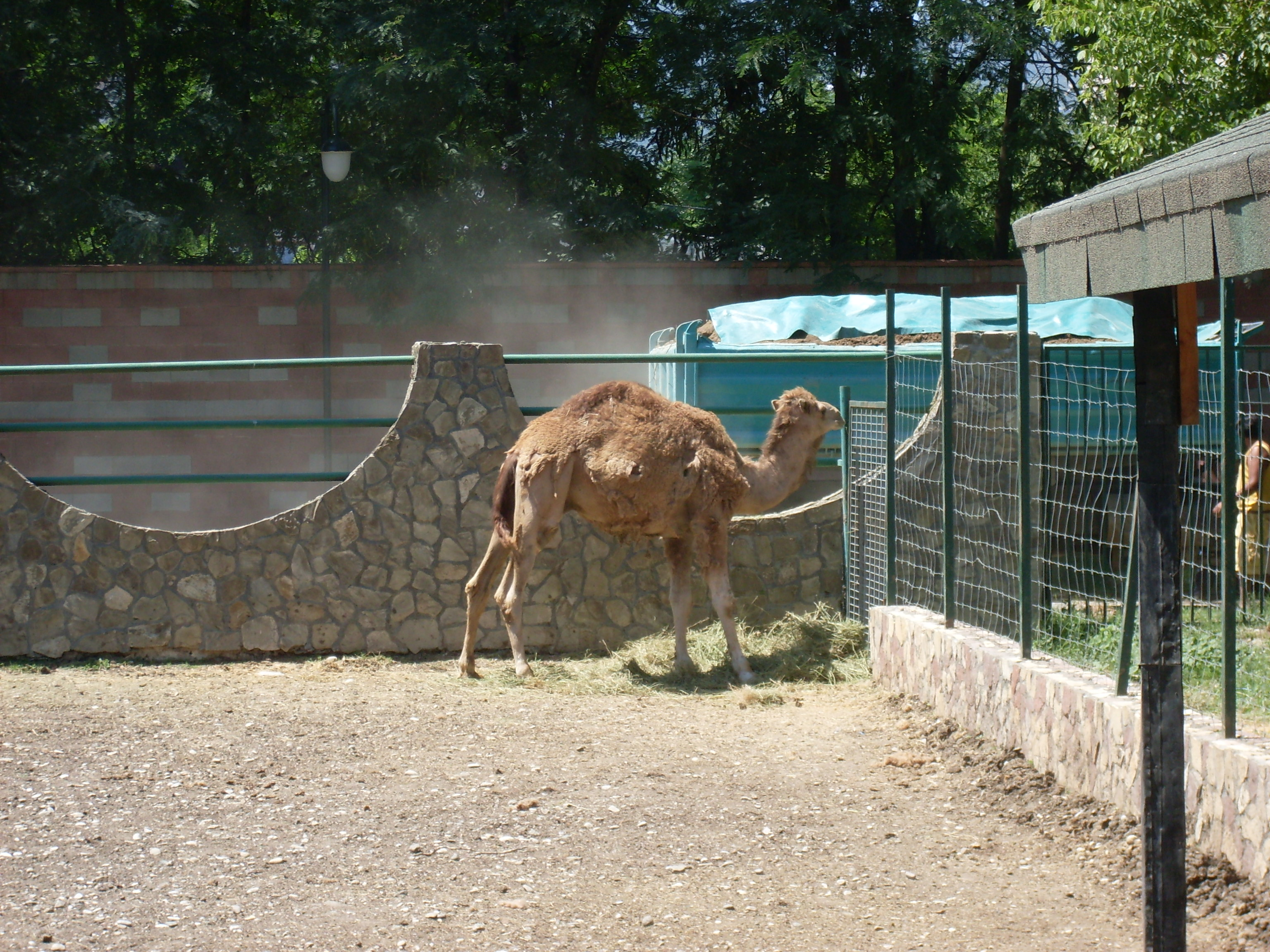
Camel

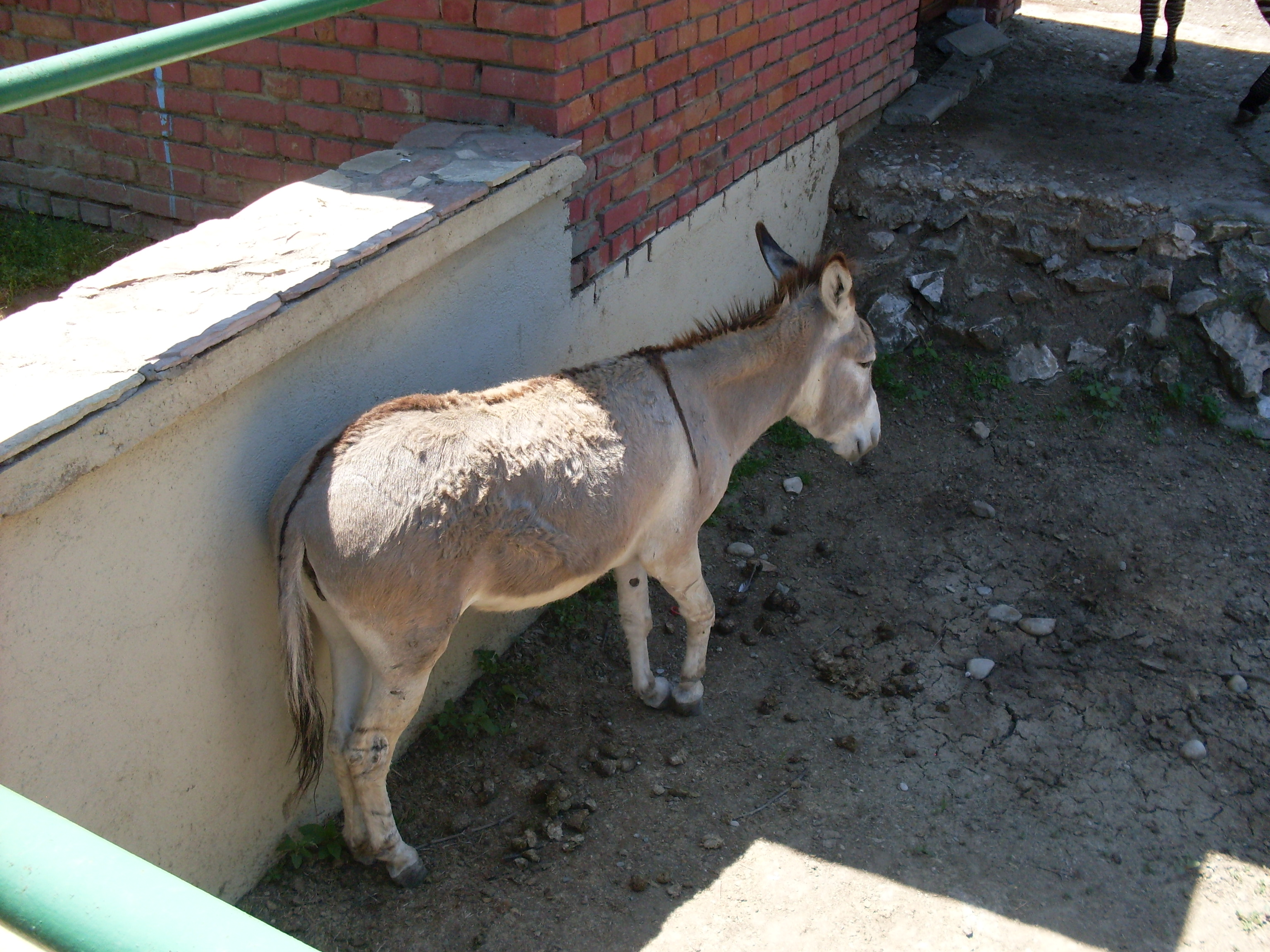
Donkey

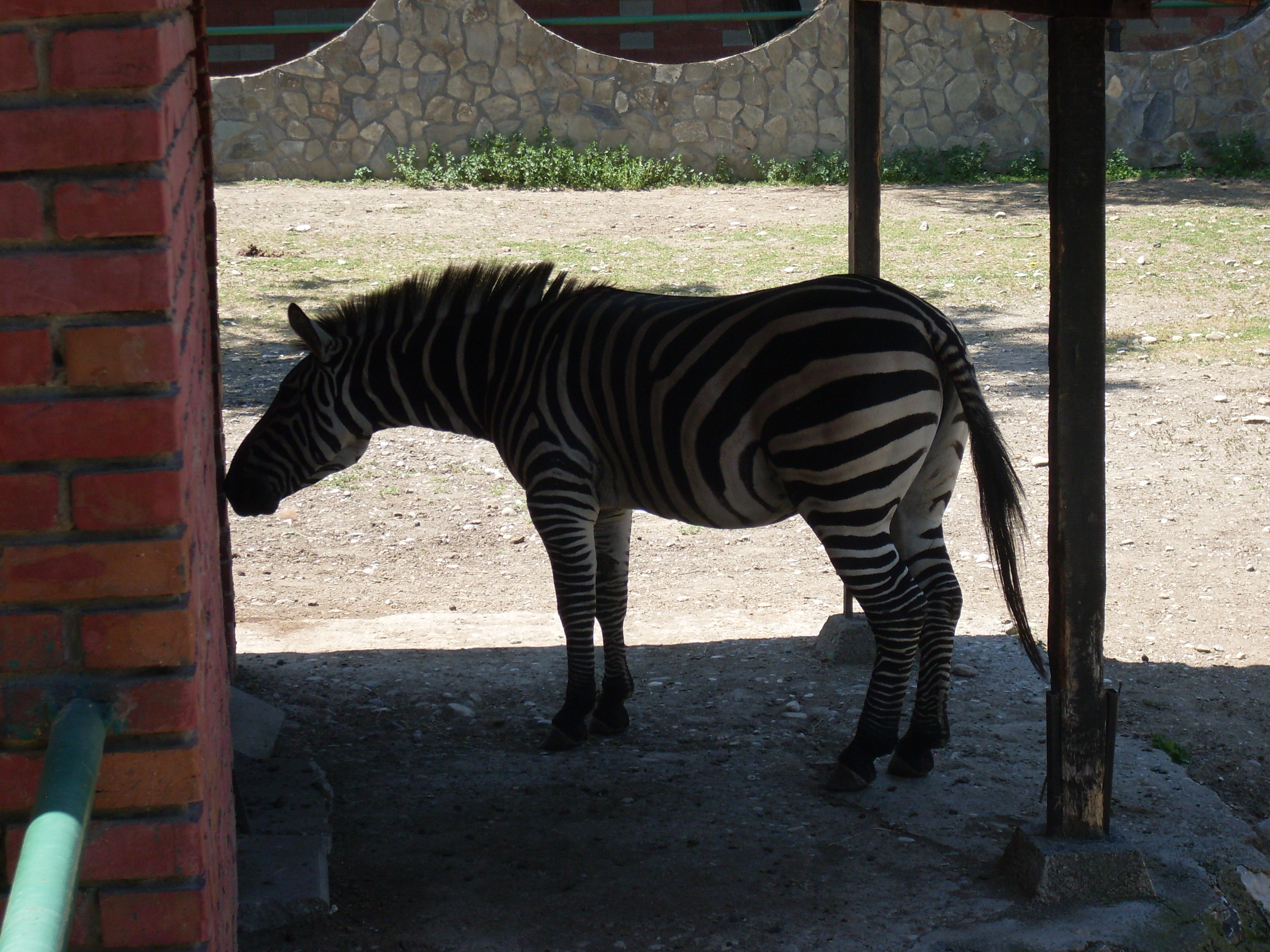
Zebra
