= Guy Standing =

Guy Standing may refer to:

- Sir Guy Standing (actor) (1873–1937), English-American actor
- Guy Standing (economist) (born 1948), British professor and economist
