= Universal basic income in the United Kingdom =

Universal basic income in the United Kingdom has not been implemented. Interest in and support for universal basic income has increased substantially amongst the public and politicians.

Political parties in the UK that have a universal basic income (UBI) as part of their policy platforms include: the Green Party of England and Wales, the Scottish National Party (SNP), and the Scottish Greens. Support for universal basic income was widespread amongst opposition politicians in 2020, including those in: Labour (though rejected by the Starmer leadership), the SNP, Liberal Democrats, and Plaid Cymru, many of whom were among the 170 MPs and Lords who signed a proposal calling on the government to introduce a universal basic income during the coronavirus pandemic.

A public poll by YouGov in 2020 found that in the view of coronavirus pandemic 51% of the public in the United Kingdom supported a universal basic income, with 24% unsupportive. A public petition on the UK government website that ran for six months from 16 March 2020 to 16 September 2020 calling for universal basic income during the course of the COVID-19 pandemic in the United Kingdom raised over 114,000 signatures.

== History (from Thomas Paine to the year 2000) ==
=== Thomas Paine: Agrarian Justice ===
Thomas Paine, an English-American philosopher and revolutionary, proposed a system whereby all citizens, when reaching adulthood, should be given an equal amount of money from the state. The idea was developed in Agrarian Justice, published 1797. The basic philosophical idea behind the proposal, explained in the book, was the contention that in the state of nature, "the earth, in its natural uncultivated state... was the common property of the human race". His contemporary and fellow pamphleteer, Thomas Spence, responded with a proposal that more closely fits the contemporary definition of basic income.

=== Speenhamland ===
The Speenhamland system was a form of poverty relief in England at the end of the 18th century and during the early 19th century. It started in the village of Speenhamland, but soon spread to most parts of the country. William Pitt the Younger tried to have the system implemented nationally but failed. Although it has one similarity to basic income, in that theoretically everyone was eligible, it was means-tested and it included work conditions and supervision that made it very different from basic income.

=== 1920s and 1930s ===
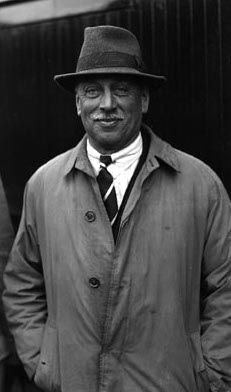
C.H. Douglas, an early British proponent of basic income and monetary reform

Even though basic income and related ideas had been proposed a few times before the 1920s (most notably Bertrand Russell in 1918), it was not until then that a social movement seems to have started around the idea. Valter Van Trier has described this movement, which started in United Kingdom, in his book Every One a King.

The idea of basic income was revived prominently by Dennis Milner and his wife Mabel Milner in their pamphlet Scheme for a State Bonus: A rational method of solving the social problem published in 1918. Following this publication, the so-called "State Bonus League" was formed in July of the same year. The League pushed the idea inside the Labour Party, which dedicated several hearings at the National Congress in 1920 and 1922, but the idea was eventually rejected.

At the same time Major C.H. Douglas, a British engineer and social philosopher, developed a new economic philosophy which he labelled Social Credit. At the heart of the philosophy was a firm belief in the importance of individual freedom, but also that the monetary system had to be changed so that the market system could function properly. In short he combined monetary reform and basic income.

=== 1940s ===
The Beveridge report, published in 1942, stated that social insurances should be the main system in society for economic security. Besides that the report also proposed a selective system for those without access to social insurances. Beveridge himself did not like means-testing and selectivism, because it created high marginal tax rates for the poor, but he nevertheless thought that it was a necessary complement. After the war the "Beveridge-model" became the guiding principle for the welfare state, both in Britain and internationally. Lady Juliet Rhys Williams proposed the "New Social Contract" as an alternative to the Beveridge Report. In short she proposed basic income in the form of a negative income tax, except that she also recommended a work test.

=== 1950s – 2000 ===
In 1972 the Cabinet of Edward Heath put forward a proposal for a tax-credit scheme which resembled a citizen's income in some ways but did not cover the whole of the population. In 1979 child benefit which is a citizen's income for children in all but name was introduced.

== 21st century debate and development ==
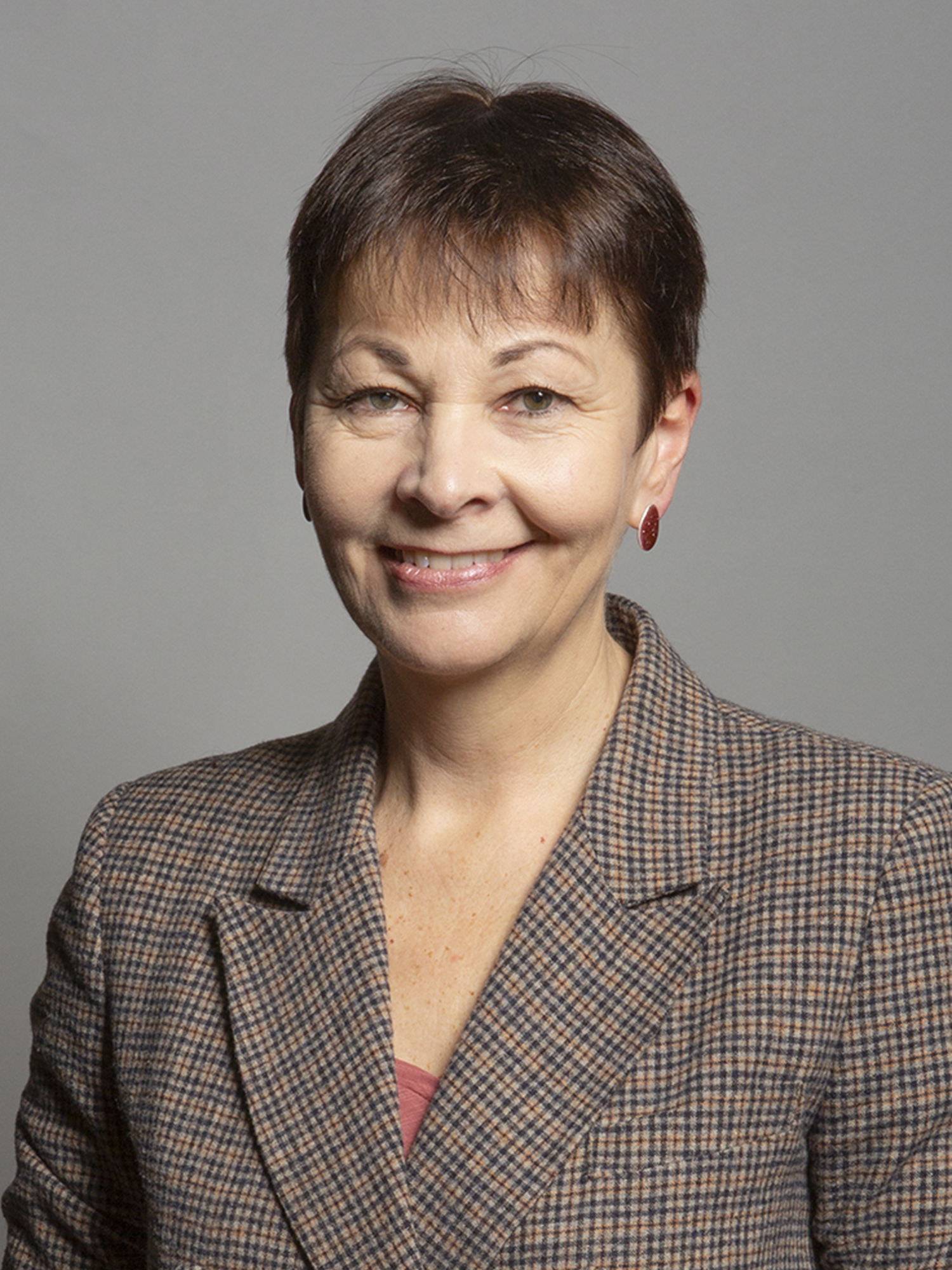
Caroline Lucas, 2019

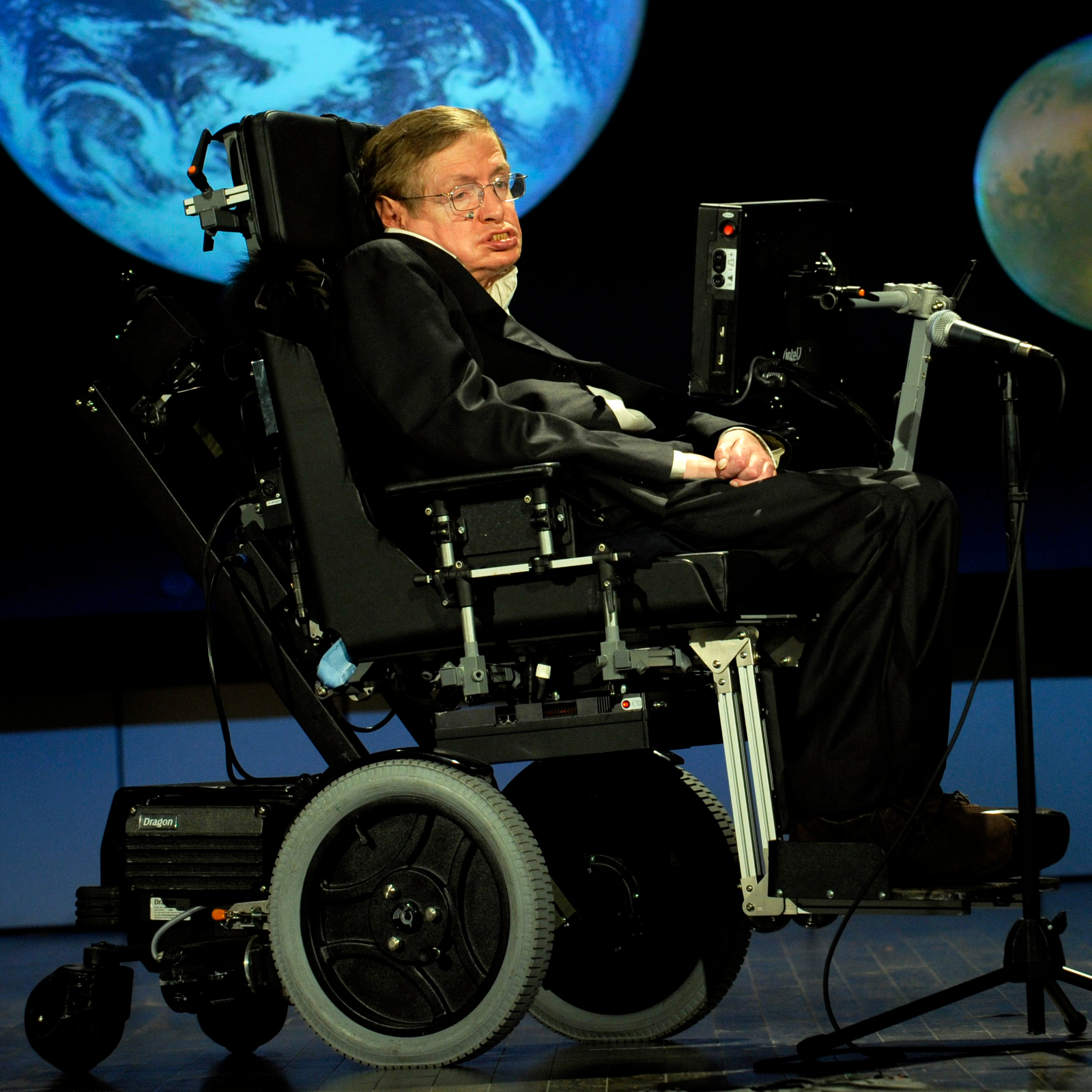
English theoretical physicist, cosmologist and author Stephen Hawking was a supporter of a universal basic income.

A system of universal basic income is supported by the Green Party of England and Wales, the Scottish National Party Scottish Greens, and the Scottish Socialist Party. For a period the Liberal Democrats also accepted it as official policy, but modified their support before members voted to adopt it as party policy in September 2020. In March 2023, a majority of members of the Liberal Democrats at the party's Spring Conference voted in favour of adopting a "Guaranteed Basic Income" (GBI) instead of a universal basic income as the Liberal Democrats official policy.

In January 2016, the sole MP of the Green Party of England and Wales, Caroline Lucas, tabled a motion in the British Parliament, calling on the Government to commission research into the effects of a universal basic income and examine its feasibility to replace the UK's existing social security system.

Former Shadow Chancellor John McDonnell is said to be a supporter of universal basic income and on 16 February 2016 said that universal basic income is "an idea we want to look at". Writing in The New Statesman on 17 February, Labour MP Jonathan Reynolds argues in its favour, (1) as a policy for coping with "inevitable but fundamental economic change," (2) as an alternative to "the bewildering complexity of our welfare system" when "people move frequently into and out of work", and (3) as a "platform from which [people] might fulfil their potential". Labour Party MP, Clive Lewis, has also stated his support for universal basic income.

In March 2020, a combined total of over 170 opposition politicians from MPs and Lords, called for the UK government to implement a universal basic income during the coronavirus pandemic in the United Kingdom. However, the Conservative government and then Chancellor of the Exchequer, Rishi Sunak, both rejected the calls.

In July 2020, the economist Karl Widerquist proposed a poverty-level universal basic income figure for the UK of £7,706 per adult per year, which is about £148 a week (or just over £642 per month) and £3,853 a year for children. Widerquist based his proposed figure for the UK on a study using data from the 2014/15 UK Family Resource Survey.

On 25 September 2020, the Liberal Democrats adopted at their party conference a policy of supporting UBI.

In mid-May 2021, after the 2021 Senedd election in which Welsh Labour won half the seats in the Welsh Parliament, Mark Drakeford, leader of Welsh Labour and First Minister of Wales, announced that a universal basic income scheme would be trialled in Wales. Plaid Cymru supported a Welsh pilot for a universal basic income in their manifesto going into the election and the Welsh Liberal Democrats also made an election commitment to support a trial, while the Welsh Conservatives rejected the idea. Recipients of the income would be given independent financial advice and support throughout the pilot who are "regularly reminded of their end point on the pilot so that appropriate plans can be made for their transition out of the pilot." As of June 2023, the pilot is ongoing with the final results expected to be thoroughly evaluated at the end of the trial.

In a poll of 2,184 adults in Great Britain in November 2021 by Savanta ComRes, 44% of respondents stated their support for a universal basic income, compared to 23% who stated that they oppose it.

=== Recent reports ===
In 2015 the London-based RSA (Royal Society for the encouragement of Arts, Manufactures and Commerce) launched its own proposal for Basic Income entitled Creative Citizens, Creative State. It advocated replacing a swathe of UK means-tested benefits with a single universal payment as a response to the changing landscape of work and an ageing population.

In March 2019, the New Economics Foundation (NEF) produced the report Nothing Personal: Replacing the personal tax allowance with a Weekly National Allowance. The report maintained that if the Government abolished the personal allowance of income tax and replaced it with a weekly cash payment of £48 a week it could lift 200,000 families out of poverty. The proposed policy swap would shift £8bn currently spent on tax allowances for the 35% highest income families to the remaining 65% of families. However, the report was critical of the notion of a universal basic income, ie, a guaranteed income for all citizens.

Approximately a week after the report by the NEF, the think tank Compass published a report written by economists Stewart Lansley and Howard Reed. Entitled Basic Income for All: From Desirability to Feasibility it suggested the government could make tax-free payments of £60 to every adult, £175 for those over 65 and £40 for each child under 18, regardless of other income. This would be designed to cut rising levels of poverty and inequality across the United Kingdom. Their report suggested the cost of reworking the tax and benefits system would be £28bn, less than the aggregate cuts to benefits since 2010 and the changes would return social security spending back to the level of a decade ago to help cover the costs of the UBI. Lansley and Reed followed up this report with a second in 2019, that took a closer look at the financial possibilities of universal basic income in the UK. In Basic Income for All: From Desirability to Feasibility, Lansley and Reed claim that "a meaningful basic income of, for example, over £10,000 per year could be paid to a family of four. Sums at this level, paid without condition, would significantly improve the living standards and life chances of millions of people and ... are affordable."

In May 2019, a report by Professor Guy Standing, commissioned by the Progressive Economic Forum and forwarded to John McDonnell (the acting Shadow Chancellor of the Exchequer) suggested different models for piloting basic income. Standing's report (Basic Income as Common Dividends: Piloting a Transformative Policy. A Report for the Shadow Chancellor of the Exchequer) cites a "perfect storm" of factors that lead to the need for a basic income: Broad ethical justifications for basic income, which Standing cites as "social justice, security, freedom and solidarity" are now working in combination with urgent socio-economic demands. "A growing proportion of people," the report states, "are in the precariat, living bits-and-pieces lives, relying on low wages and incomes that are increasingly volatile and unpredictable and on inadequate and uncertain benefits in times of loss of earnings power." Echoing William Beveridge's 1942 report suggesting the need for a Welfare State in the UK, Standing states there are eight modern giants, stretching form inequality, debt through to neo-fascism, that basic income could help tackle. The report is also highly critical of current UK welfare schemes, mainly Universal Credit, which he states are unfair for large families, have high administrative costs and limit personal freedom.

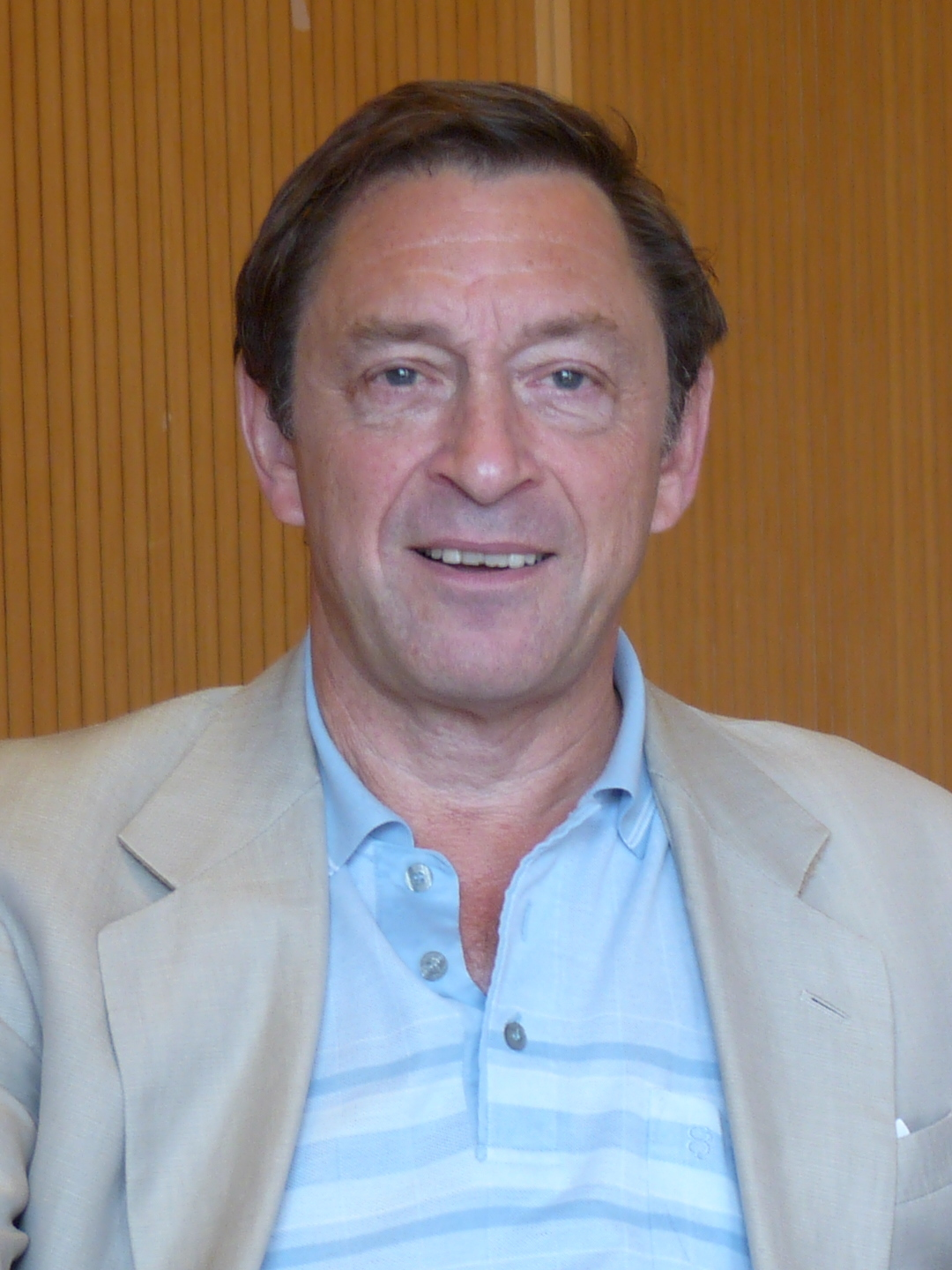
Guy Standing, author of Basic Income: And How We Can Make It Happen and Basic Income as Common Dividends: Piloting a Transformative Policy

The report deals with the most common objections to a basic income. To the objection that basic income is not affordable, Professor Standing said there are 1,156 tax reliefs in the UK at the moment and if they were scrapped that would pay for a basic income. "If we phased out those tax reliefs the total revenue foregone by the Treasury from tax reliefs is £420bn per year and that's their own estimates, not mine," he added. He also suggests "a more general Commons Permanent Fund, in which a national investment fund would be built mainly from levies on commercial intrusions into the commons, boosted by contributions from a land-value tax, eco taxes, digital information levies and several others."

In July 2022, data was published from polling by YouGov that suggested that a plurality of British people support a universal basic income.

In November 2023, The Trussell Trust calculated that a single adult in the UK in 2023 needs at least £29,500 a year to have an acceptable standard of living, up from £25,000 in 2022. Two partners with two children would need £50,000, compared to £44,500 in 2022. 29% of the UK population – which works out to 19.2 million people – belong to households that bring in below the minimum standard.

=== Proposed pilots ===
Until July 2022 there were no regional universal basic income pilots running in the UK. In 2018, the Scottish Government agreed to provide £250,000 to undertake initial research on the feasibility of a basic income pilot, making use of experience and expertise from four areas of the country: Glasgow, Edinburgh and the regions of Fife and North Ayrshire. The project determined that such a pilot was feasible. Making use of the term Citizen's Basic Income (CBI), the writers of the report recommended that pilot should be "a randomised controlled study, with two study areas where the whole community receives a CBI". One study area should receive a high payment, the other receiving a lower payment. The goal of the pilot would be to "understand the impact of CBI on poverty, child poverty and unemployment, as well as health and financial wellbeing, and experience of the social security system." The report was clear in its preference for a pilot that met all the characteristics of a universal basic income - ie, that the communities should receive the income as money (rather than as a voucher), as a regular payment, given to all individuals within the defined community, and that it should be unconditional.

However, the report also noted that there were "substantive and complex legislative and delivery barriers to piloting a CBI", given that Scottish Parliamentary powers were limited in their ability to make the needed changes to the social security system (which were determined at the UK Parliament in Westminster). The current constitutional and legal set up "would place significant restrictions on the pilot model design and potentially compromise learnings." The Scottish Government of 2022 therefore decided to focus on a Minimum Income Guarantee (MIG)

The Royal Society for the Encouragement of Arts, Manufactures and Commerce has also produced a report examining some of the benefits and challenges of a basic income system in the region of Fife. And in 2019, the council of Sheffield agreed to work on ensuring that "UBI can be implemented successfully in Sheffield”. The council of Liverpool has also shown enthusiasm for experimenting with a basic income.

In October 2020, Wales' Future Generations Commissioner Sophie Howe recommended that a universal basic income and a shorter working week should be piloted by the next Welsh Government.

A 2023 report produced by the think tank Autonomy proposed a trial of basic income of £1,600 a month in Jarrow, in north-east England, and East Finchley, in north London. The proposed trial would involve 30 people and would last two years.

=== Basic income for care leavers pilot ===
In 2022, the Welsh Government established the Basic Income for Care Leavers in Wales pilot with an initial budget of £20 million. The intervention was designed to reduce disadvantage and strengthen support for young people transitioning out of local authority care into adulthood.

==== Target group and payment structure ====
The scheme targeted Category 3 care leavers in Wales who turned 18 years of age between 1 July 2022 and 30 June 2023. Participation was voluntary, and 97% of eligible care leavers (644 individuals) enrolled in the scheme.

Enrolled participants received regular payments of £1,600 per month gross, paid unconditionally for up to 24 months (two years). Income tax of £320 per month was deducted at source by the Welsh Government and paid directly to HM Revenue and Customs (HMRC), giving recipients a net monthly income of £1,280.

==== Governance and additional support ====
The pilot was designed to supplement, rather than replace, existing statutory provision for care leavers. Participants retained existing entitlements, including support from allocated Young Person’s Advisors, council tax liability exemptions, higher education bursaries, and access to discretionary grants via the St David’s Day Fund. Optional, demand-led financial guidance was also offered to participants through Citizens Advice Cymru.

Policy governance was maintained through an Operational Group, a Steering Group, and an independent Technical Advisory Group chaired by Professor Sir Michael Marmot. Because social security and justice are non-devolved matters in the UK, the pilot experienced intergovernmental friction. For example, the UK Ministry of Justice declined a request by the Welsh Government to disregard pilot payments in means assessments for legal aid.

==== Evaluation and participant outcomes ====
Delivery of the pilot payments has concluded, with the overarching research evaluation running through 2027. Qualitative findings published in the evaluation's third annual report (2025 - 2026) captured participants' and professionals' experiences mid-pilot and 2 to 3 months after payments ended.

These qualitative evaluations found that unconditional payments increased recipients' personal autonomy, financial security, and social participation while reducing financial stress and anxiety. However, outcomes across the participant cohort were varied:

- Education and employment: While some recipients used financial security to pursue higher education, complete job training, or fund driving lessons to improve employability, others reported that the income reduced their immediate urgency to seek work.
- Housing: Interactions with means-tested Housing Benefit caused financial disparities. Recipients residing in high-cost supported accommodation or temporary housing had significant portions of their basic income absorbed by rental charges.
- Post-pilot transition: Following the conclusion of the two-year payment window, some participants experienced anxiety and financial hardship when adjusting to lower, conditional welfare benefits such as Universal Credit.

Quantitative assessments of overall policy impact and formal economic cost-effectiveness analyses will be published in a fourth annual report in spring 2027 and a final evaluation report later in 2027. Long-term participant outcomes will also be tracked via anonymised administrative data linkage in secure research environments such as the SAIL Databank.

==== Professional perspectives ====
Evaluations capturing the perspectives of local authority social workers, personal advisors, and team managers revealed mixed professional views. Practitioners most frequently described the scheme as an “opportunity”. However, many expressed concerns regarding the lack of behavioural conditions, potential financial exploitation by third parties, and the long-term sustainability of recipient outcomes after payments ended.

==== Critics ====
There are also several critics on both the right and left of British politics. The former Conservative MP Nick Boles said in 2017 that talk of a universal basic income as a response to the rise of robots is "dangerous nonsense". The main argument against basic income for the Conservatives, he said, should be that it is morally wrong. In his online book "Square Deal" he writes: "Mankind is hard-wired to work. We gain satisfaction from it. It gives us a sense of identity, purpose and belonging ... we should not be trying to create a world in which most people do not feel the need to work."

Ian Goldin, Professor of Globalisation and Development at the University of Oxford, has written against UBI claiming it "will lead to higher inequality and poverty" and "undermine social cohesion." Various pressure groups and think tanks share such suspicions. A report by DPAC (Disabled People Against Cuts) consider that "the need to finance universal basic income payments could lead to even more pressure to save money by restricting eligibility [for welfare payments for the disabled] than under the current system. The New Economics Foundation concluded that "UBI is an individualistic, monetary intervention that undermines social solidarity and fails to tackle the underlying causes of poverty, unemployment and inequality", it instead favours a guaranteed minimum income and a "National Energy Guarantee" (NEG).

== Academic debate ==
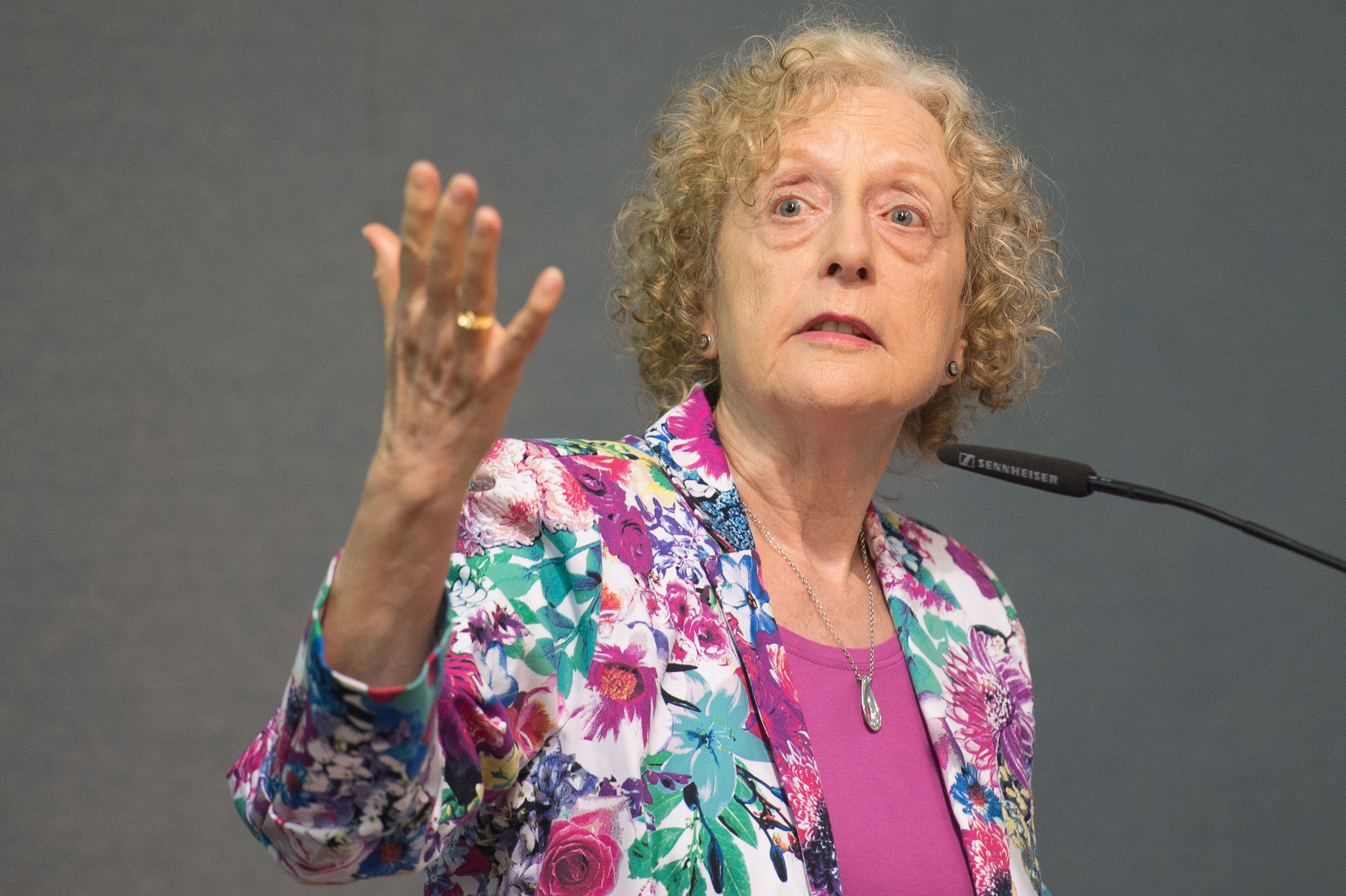
Carole Pateman, 2015

Several British academics have been involved in the basic income debate. Among them the following:

- Stephen Hawking, an English theoretical physicist, cosmologist, and author was a supporter of a universal basic income.
- James Meade, a left-leaning economist and winner of the 1977 Nobel Memorial Prize in Economic Sciences, took part in the basic income discussion from time to time. In his last books Full Employment Regained and Agathopia he returned to the question.
- Guy Standing has been very active in the debate since the 1980s. He is now especially well known for his theory about the so-called precariat, a new social class which he thinks is growing because of globalisation, and that this development is yet another strong argument for why basic income should be implemented.
- Carole Pateman, a British political scientist, has declared that she sees basic income as a fundamental human right. For the system to reach its full potential, however, it is important that the level is not set too low.

== In media ==
The documentary The Cost of Living: Does Britain Need a Basic Income? – a companion piece to the film The Future of Work and Death – was released on Amazon Prime on 8 October 2020. The documentary explores the feasibility of a basic income in Britain and ultimately asks if the cost of living can be subsidised, should it be subsidised? It features welfare advisors, philosophers, economists and many basic income advocates including Guy Standing, George Monbiot, David Graeber and A. C. Grayling. The film received an online premiere screening during the COVID-19 lockdowns hosted by The Green Party.

== Organisations ==
The organisation Basic Income UK is "a collective of independent people promoting unconditional basic income as a progressive social policy for the United Kingdom, and beyond".

"The Citizen's Basic Income Trust promotes debate on the desirability and feasibility of a Citizen's Income by publishing a newsletter and other publications, maintaining a library of resources, and responding to requests for information". In February 2021, it launched an educational podcast exploring various ways on how UBI could tackle social issues. The trust was founded in 1984 as the Basic Income Research Group and later changed its name to CIT. The current director is Malcolm Torry, who is also the general manager of Basic Income Earth Network (BIEN).

Founded in Sheffield in 2016, the UBI Lab Network is made up of "a growing number of grassroots groups set up to examine the idea’s potential impact within a certain area and explore the launching of pilot schemes."

Chaired by Willie Sullivan, the Citizen's Basic Income Network Scotland "is a new organisation set up to raise awareness of the benefits that a Basic Income would bring to Scotland".

== See also ==
- Tony Atkinson
- Ailsa McKay
