= WikiWarMonitor =

Wikipedia-affiliated website

WikiWarMonitor is a website dedicated to resolving Wikipedia edit wars. It is operated by a group of researchers from Oxford Internet Institute, Rutgers University, and Central European University.

WikiWarMonitor is part of a project called ICTeCollective (which stands for Harnessing ICT-enabled Collective Social Behaviour) and is supported by the European Commission, CORDIS FP7 (Seventh Framework Programme), information and communications technology (or ICT), and Future and Emerging Technologies Open Scheme (FET-Open).

According to CORDIS, the objective of ICT research under the EU's Seventh Framework Programme (which ICTeCollective and WikiWarMonitor are part of) is "to improve the competitiveness of European industry – as well as to enable Europe to master and shape the future developments of these technologies so that the demands of its society and economy are met."

== Findings ==
WikiWarMonitor publishes a list of the 100 most controversial Wikipedia articles in 13 different languages using a special algorithm. One of their findings was that the editorial conflicts vary by language and are endless when it comes to polarizing terms such as 'homosexuality', or individuals such as former U.S. President George W. Bush.

=== Top 100 controversial articles on English Wikipedia ===
WikiWarMonitor list of top 100 controversial articles in English Wikipedia as of 2013:

- George W. Bush
- Anarchism
- Muhammad
- List of World Wrestling Entertainment employees
- Global warming
- Circumcision
- United States
- Jesus
- Race and intelligence
- Christianity
- Michael Jackson
- Barack Obama
- Islam
- Intelligent design
- Adolf Hitler
- Falun Gong
- European Union
- Abortion
- Kosovo
- Islamophobia
- September 11 attacks
- John Kerry
- Transnistria
- Chiropractic
- Macedonians (ethnic group)
- Homeopathy
- Srebrenica massacre
- Scientology
- Capitalism
- Japan
- Israel and apartheid
- Israel
- Prem Rawat
- White people
- Catholic Church
- Ann Coulter
- Jehovah's Witnesses
- Hamas
- Jimmy Wales
- Elvis Presley
- Fidel Castro
- Joseph Stalin
- Jyllands-Posten Muhammad cartoons controversy
- John Howard
- Black people
- India
- List of Barney & Friends episodes and videos
- 2006 Lebanon War
- Evolution
- Assyrian people
- Republic of Macedonia
- Wikipedia
- United Kingdom
- Socialism
- Ayn Rand
- Developed country
- Holodomor
- Freemasonry
- Fox News Channel
- Libertarianism
- World War II
- Fascism
- Afghanistan
- Deaths in 2008
- Moldova
- Ron Paul
- Canada
- Mahmoud Ahmadinejad
- Liberation Tigers of Tamil Eelam
- Iran
- Wii
- Armenian genocide
- British Isles
- Britney Spears
- Banu Qurayza
- Mexico
- United States and state terrorism
- Lyndon LaRouche
- John Cena
- Nicolaus Copernicus
- Second Amendment to the United States Constitution
- Turkey
- Akatsuki (Naruto)
- 9/11 conspiracy theories
- Super Smash Bros. Brawl
- Atheism
- Ward Churchill
- Islam and antisemitism
- Scotland
- Quebec
- God
- Homosexuality
- International recognition of Kosovo
- Creation Science
- People for the Ethical Treatment of Animals
- Ronald Reagan
- Northern Ireland
- The Used
- Northern Cyprus
- Truth

== Publications ==
- Sumi, Róbert; Yasseri, Taha; Rung, András; Kornai, András; Kertész, János (2011). "Edit Wars in Wikipedia". 2011 IEEE Third International Conference on Privacy, Security, Risk and Trust and 2011 IEEE Third International Conference on Social Computing. pp. 724–727. arXiv:1107.3689. doi:10.1109/PASSAT/SocialCom.2011.47. ISBN 978-1-4577-1931-8. S2CID 14151613.
- Yasseri, Taha; Sumi, Robert; Rung, András; Kornai, András; Kertész, János (2012). "Dynamics of Conflicts in Wikipedia". PLOS ONE. 7 (6) e38869. arXiv:1202.3643. Bibcode:2012PLoSO...738869Y. doi:10.1371/journal.pone.0038869. PMC 3380063. PMID 22745683.
- Török, János; Iñiguez, Gerardo; Yasseri, Taha; San Miguel, Maxi; Kaski, Kimmo; Kertész, János (2013). "Opinions, Conflicts, and Consensus: Modeling Social Dynamics in a Collaborative Environment". Physical Review Letters. 110 (8) 088701. arXiv:1207.4914. Bibcode:2013PhRvL.110h8701T. doi:10.1103/PhysRevLett.110.088701. PMID 23473207. S2CID 2496524.
- Yasseri, Taha; Spoerri, Anselm; Graham, Mark; Kertész, János (2013), The most controversial topics in Wikipedia: A multilingual and geographical analysis, arXiv:1305.5566, Bibcode:2013arXiv1305.5566Y, doi:10.2139/ssrn.2269392, S2CID 12133330, SSRN 2269392
