= Wikipedia Star Trek Into Darkness debate =

Stylistic Wikipedia debate (2012–2013)

- Part of the Wikipedia controversies
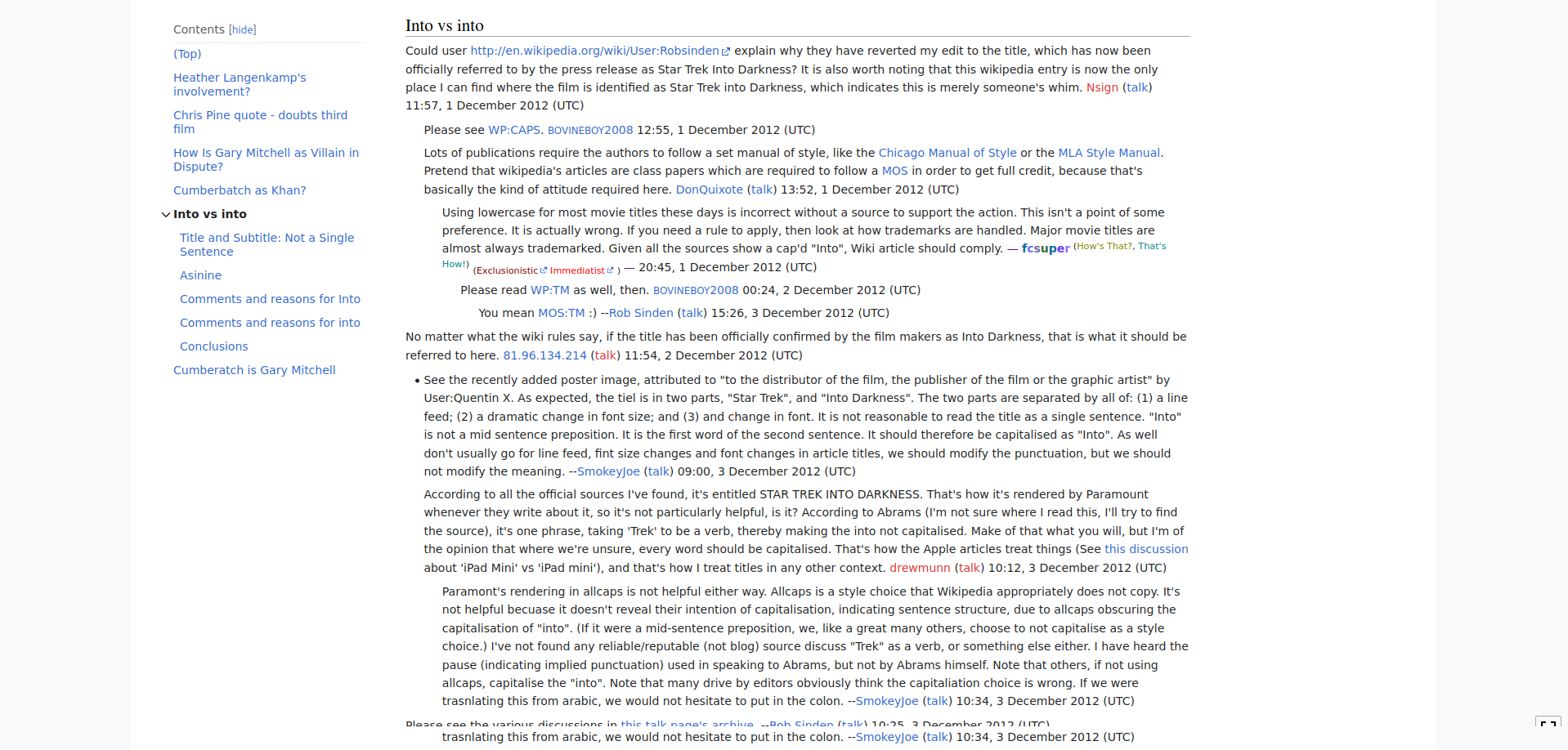
- The beginning of the discussion and the table of contents showing the sections created during it
- Date: December 1, 2012 – January 31, 2013
- Caused by: Dispute over capitalization of Star Trek Into Darkness page title
- Resulted in: Consensus to render the article title as Star Trek Into Darkness

From December 1, 2012, until January 31, 2013, a stylistic disagreement unfolded between editors on the English-language Wikipedia as to whether the word "into" in the title of the Wikipedia article for the 2013 film Star Trek Into Darkness should be capitalized. More than 40,000 words were written on the article's talk page (a page for editors to discuss changes to the article) before a consensus was reached to capitalize the "I".

== Debate ==
Director J. J. Abrams planned to release the film Star Trek Into Darkness in April 2013. Its title did not contain a colon after "Star Trek", such as in Star Trek II: The Wrath of Khan and eight other Star Trek films. The "I" was to be capitalized in Abrams's April release, but Wikipedia's Manual of Style stipulates that prepositions with fewer than five letters are not to be capitalized.

The full discussion that would decide if Wikipedia should lowercase or uppercase the "I" in the word "into" in the film's title unfolded at the article's talk page from December 1, 2012 to January 9, 2013, and then was picked up again from January 13 to January 31, 2013. The dispute over whether to adhere to or make an exception to Wikipedia's guideline stretched to over 40,000 words.

A major area of the debate concerned whether or not "Into Darkness" was a subtitle of Star Trek Into Darkness, which was not clear without the colon. If the phrase was a subtitle, as with every other Star Trek film with a title longer than two words except for Star Trek Generations, then Wikipedia's manual of style would recommend that "Into" be capitalized as the first word in the subtitle. The opposing side argued that it would violate Wikipedia's policy against original research to assume that "Into Darkness" was a subtitle, that Star Trek Into Darkness may have been intended to be read as a sentence, and that it would support the studio's marketing strategy to allow "Into Darkness" to be interpreted as a subtitle. If "Into Darkness" was not a subtitle, then Wikipedia's manual of style would recommend that "into" be uncapitalized as a four-letter preposition. Furthermore, the uncapitalization camp argued that Abrams said that the film's title would not have "a subtitle with a colon".

The side in favor of capitalization further argued that both secondary and primary sources used a capital "I". In an outburst, an unregistered Wikipedia editor wrote "READ THE GODDAMN OFFICIAL WEBSITE, YOU POMPOUS IDIOTS". (Note: For an archived copy of the film's official website as it appeared at the time this comment was posted, see http://www.startrekmovie.com at the Wayback Machine (archived January 30, 2013).) As a compromise, the lead for the article initially read "Star Trek into Darkness (usually written as Star Trek Into Darkness) ..." before consensus was reached for the capitalization of "I".

== Reaction and aftermath ==
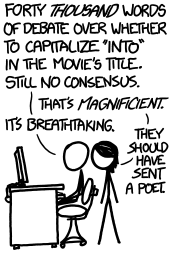
An excerpt of the January 30, 2013, xkcd cartoon by Randall Munroe about the extended talk page discussion

On January 30, 2013, Kevin Morris wrote in The Daily Dot, "When it comes to world class pedantry, few groups can challenge the prowess of Wikipedians and Star Trek fans".

During the dispute, cartoonist Randall Munroe wrote and drew a January 30, 2013, xkcd comic strip both honoring and making fun of the edit war, depicting an editor who resolved the edit war by rewriting the title as "~*~StAr TrEk InTo DaRkNeSs~*~".

A month after the discussion had ended, the dispute was still interfering with Google searches for Star Trek Into Darkness—searches for the film would return the title with a lowercase i, even though by that point the argument had been decided in favor of the capitalized I. Morris commented that the incident shows the impact small groups of Wikipedia editors can have, especially in situations more severe than a simple capitalized letter.

The 2016 Christian Science Monitor article "The Source Code of Political Power", by Simon DeDeo of Indiana University, used the debate as one example of how Wikipedia is an evolving system of ideas and found comparison to the Talmud. Accordingly, DeDeo opined that Wikipedia was moving towards increased complexity, refinement, and bureaucracy. Wikipedia co-founder Jimmy Wales discussed the controversy in his 2025 book The Seven Rules of Trust as an example of the encyclopedia's rigor.

== See also ==
- List of edit wars on Wikipedia
