= Disputes on Wikipedia =

Conflicts among Wikipedia editors

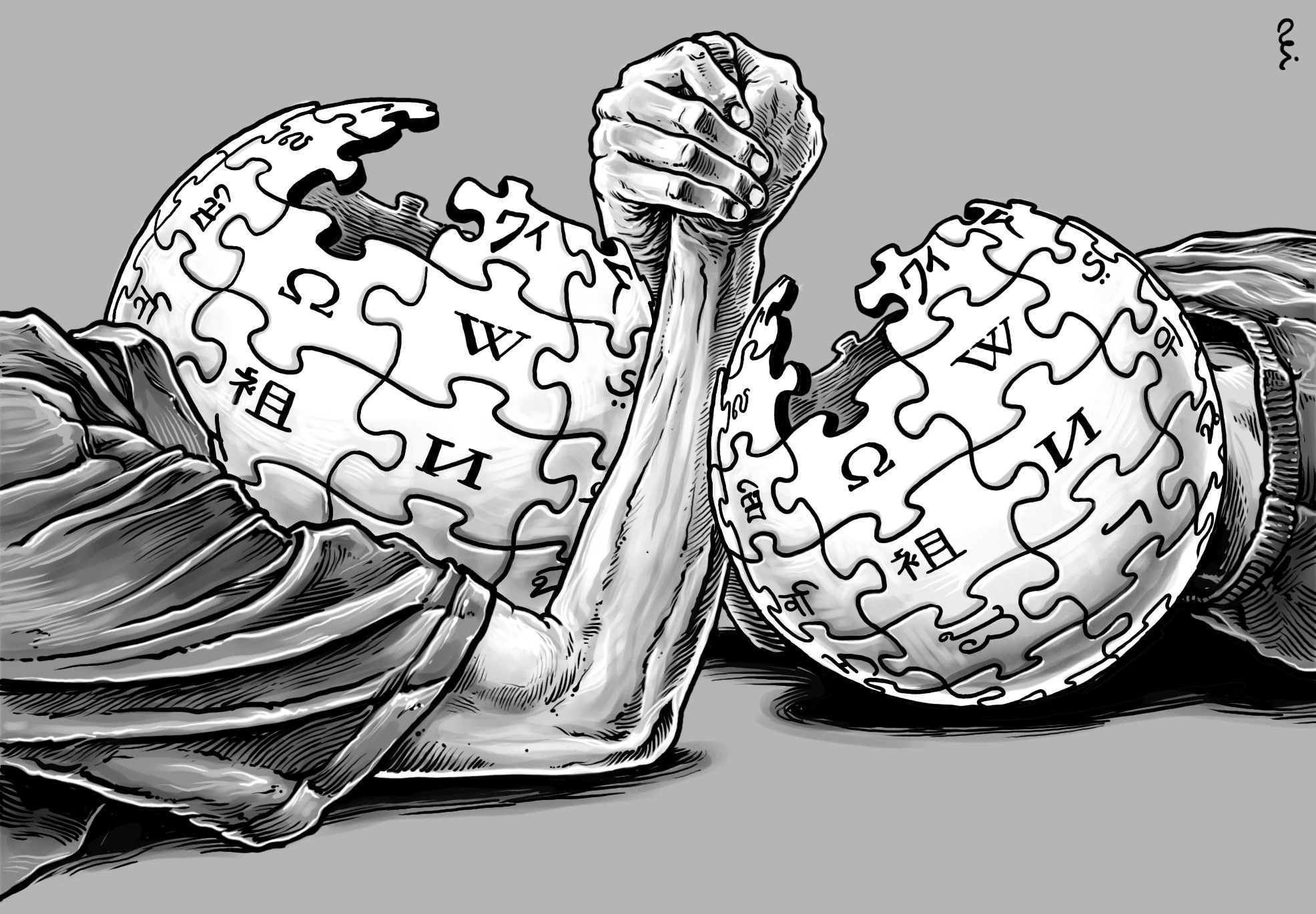
Graphic depicting an edit war by Czech illustrator Pavel Reisenauer

On Wikipedia, disputes arise from Wikipedians, who are volunteer editors, disagreeing over article content, internal Wikipedia affairs, or alleged misconduct. Disputes often manifest as repeated competing changes to an article, known as "edit wars", where instead of making small changes, edits are "reverted" wholesale. Disputes may escalate into dispute resolution efforts and enforcement.

Disputes are encouraged to be discussed on talk pages, but can go straight to editing bans, and some editors just "walk away" from conflict, especially if they do not know how to defend their edits within Wikipedia's complex systems.

An early but persistent source of conflict is "proprietary editing", where an editor, who may have started an article, will not allow other editors to make changes to their content or language. Many current conflicts play out in articles about contentious topics, often with two entrenched opposing sides, that reflect debates and conflicts in society, based on ethnic, political, religious, and scientific differences.

Dispute resolution efforts have shifted over the years. For content disputes in English Wikipedia, as of 2024, editors most often resort to Requests for Comment, along with specialized discussion structures, such as Articles for Deletion. For alleged user misconduct, some Wikipedias rely on Arbitration Committees as the final word.

Disputes, editor behavior, and collaboration on Wikipedia have long been the subject of academic research, especially in the English Wikipedia. A 2023 review identified 217 articles about contributor goals, interactions, and collaboration processes, which identified 34 studies of "the causes and impact of conflict, the mechanisms for resolving conflict, and the measurement and prediction of conflict or controversial articles." The review examined numerous studies of editor coordination, especially on Talk pages, as well as algorithmic governance using bots to enforce Wikipedia policies. The review found that research attention peaked in 2012, and overall Wikipedia editing peaked in 2007.

== Identification of disputes ==
As an open collaboration writing project, from the outset Wikipedia expected disagreements among contributors. The point at which disagreements turn into disputes, and conflicts, is not uniformly defined by Wikipedia communities and the scholars who study them.

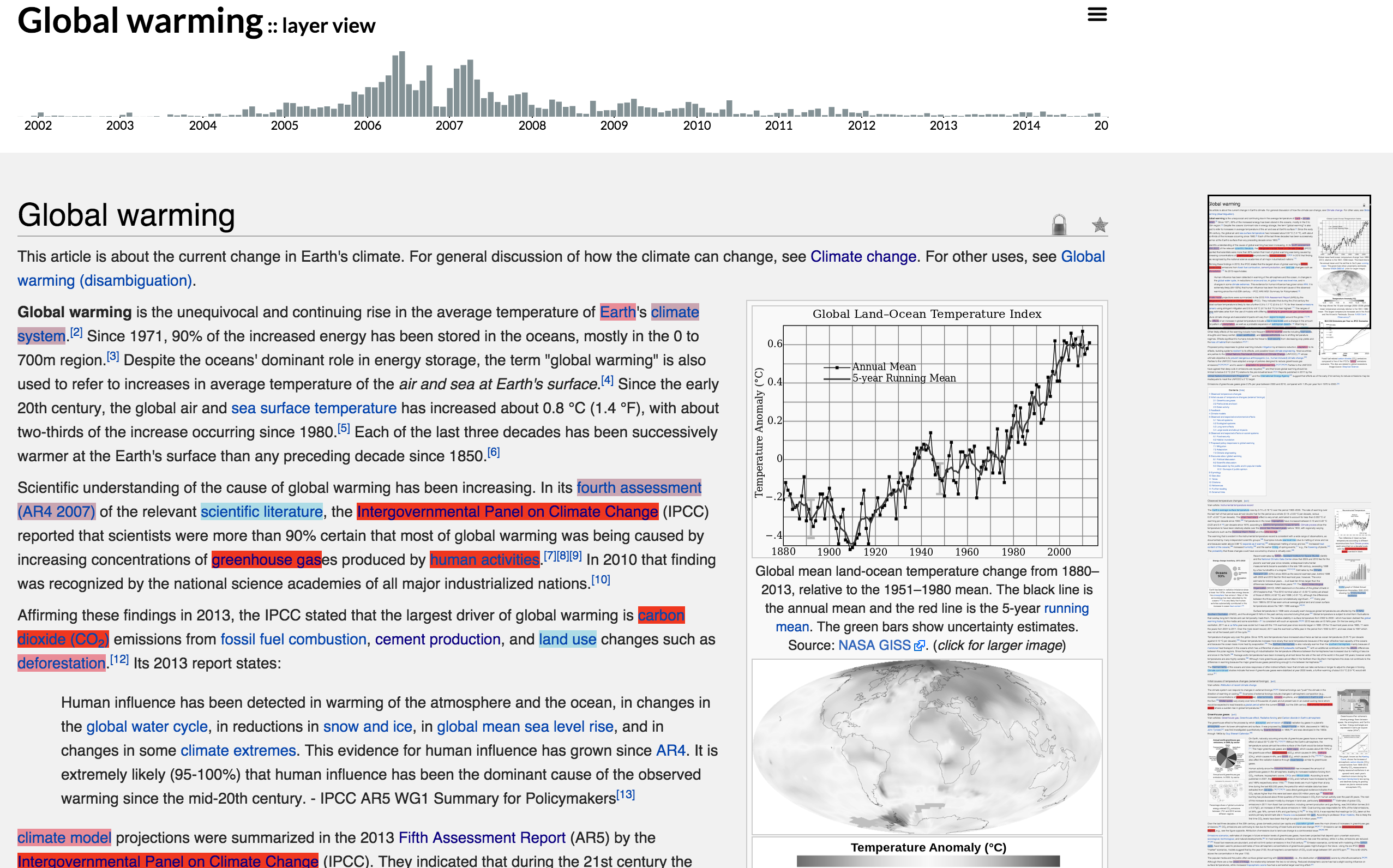
Visualization of disputed edits, using the Contropedia platform

Conflicts over content within articles often arise among editors, which may result in edit wars. An edit war is a persistent exchange of edits representing conflicting views on a contested article, or as defined by the website's policy: "when editors who disagree about the content of a page repeatedly override each other's edits." Edit wars are prohibited on Wikipedia and editors are encouraged to seek consensus through discussion, however administrative intervention may be applied if discussion is unfruitful in resolving the conflict. Generally, edit wars are provoked by the presence of highly controversial content, such as abortion or the Israeli–Palestinian conflict, but can also occur due to other disputed matters, such as the nationality of artist Francis Bacon. According to a 2020 study, the longest edit war sequence, with 105 reverts by 20 users, was a 2008 tug-of-war over the biography of Turkey's first president, Mustafa Kemal Atatürk.

Researchers also designed an analytical platform, titled Contropedia, to observe and measure protracted editing controversies, such as global warming.

Edit wars may be defined and detected in terms of reverts and mutual re-reverts. In 2004, the community instituted the three revert rule, which was examined in subsequent scholarship. The rule reportedly cut reverts in half. To identify editing disputes, scholars also tried using the number of article revisions, deletion rates between editors, or a tag placed on controversial articles. For example, up to mid-2020, there were in-depth Talk page arguments over 7,425 instances of a dispute tag. In 2012, Yasseri et al. identified disputes through a pattern recognition algorithm and tested it against human evaluations of article. By avoiding language-based criteria, they stated that their method "makes possible both inter-cultural comparisons and cross-language checks and validation". Accordingly, in a 2014 chapter, Yasseri led a different team to identify the most controversial articles in 10 Wikipedias, including Arabic, Hebrew, and Hungarian.

Later research has used other methods, even absent reverts and deletion patterns. A 2021 study claimed 80% accuracy in identifying "conflict-prone discussions" by their structural features, such as back and forth commenting by two editors (ABA pattern), before any contributions by a third person. Other features include phrases and pronoun usage that mark the level of politeness or collaboration. De Kock and Vlachos classified disputes with a natural language processing (NLP) model that improved on feature-based models.

Many disputes center on the deletion of written content, which can be seen as a kind of gatekeeping. In a comparative study of such network gatekeeping on French and Spanish decolonization cases, it was found that more active editors experience fewer deletions and appear to function within rival camps.

== Impact of disputes ==
Disputes are widely seen as a drain on the Wikipedia community, without adding to useful knowledge, and as creating a competitive and conflict-based culture associated with conventional masculine gender roles. Research has focused on the impoliteness of disputes, which can harm personal identities, "violate boundaries", and diminish voluntarism. Entrenched editor conflicts are said to detract from the quality and purported neutrality of Wikipedia articles.

Occasionally, a behind-the-scenes dispute will garner negative media attention as a Wikipedia controversy. For example, after the 2019 ban of a user by the Wikimedia Foundation, media stories covered the internal debate and the resignation of 21 administrators from English Wikipedia. Nonetheless, adversarial editing has been defended by Wikipedia leadership as important for collaboration and scholars have argued that well-managed friction among editors can benefit the encyclopedia. Controversial topics may also attract editors, as found by a 2017 lab experiment with people exposed to German Wikipedia.

== Features of disputes ==
With civility as a core principle of Wikipedia, user disputes often feature impoliteness. According to a study of disputes on 120 Talk pages, by and large "Wikipedians do not prolong the conflicts." The most common incivility is scorn, ridicule, or condescension, followed by "pointed criticism". Impolite comments got no traction, no response, two-fifths of the time. Regardless of the topic area, overt responses were divided: 37 percent of responses to rude conduct were defensive, such as explaining oneself or asking for information about the critic's concern. However, 53.5 percent of the time, people responded offensively. According to a similar study, personal attacks were reciprocated 26% immediately.

Editors use a range of rebuttal tactics, ranging from insults to derailing to counterargument and refutation. Higher quality rebuttals "correlate to more constructive outcomes". Coordination tactics include asking questions, providing information, supplying context, offering a compromise, conceding or admitting lack of knowledge. Deferential wording reduces conflict, such as the phrase "by the way" or hedging to signal an openness to compromise.

During editing disputes, Wikipedians have been found to adopt five conversational roles: architect (of the discussion structure), content expert, moderator, policy wonk, and wordsmith. The edit-focused roles, of expert and wordsmith, tended to be more successful than the conceptual, organizational roles, such as policy wonk. Indeed, when editors bring up Wikipedia policies during a general content dispute, "wiki-lawyering", they tend to escalate the editorial conflict. Still, researchers found that citing Wikipedia policy, such as Notability, does help settle disputes over the deletion of articles.

Editing disputes may go through stages or a life cycle, as David Moats showed for the use of sources in the early days of writing about the Fukushima nuclear accident.

== Deletion disputes ==
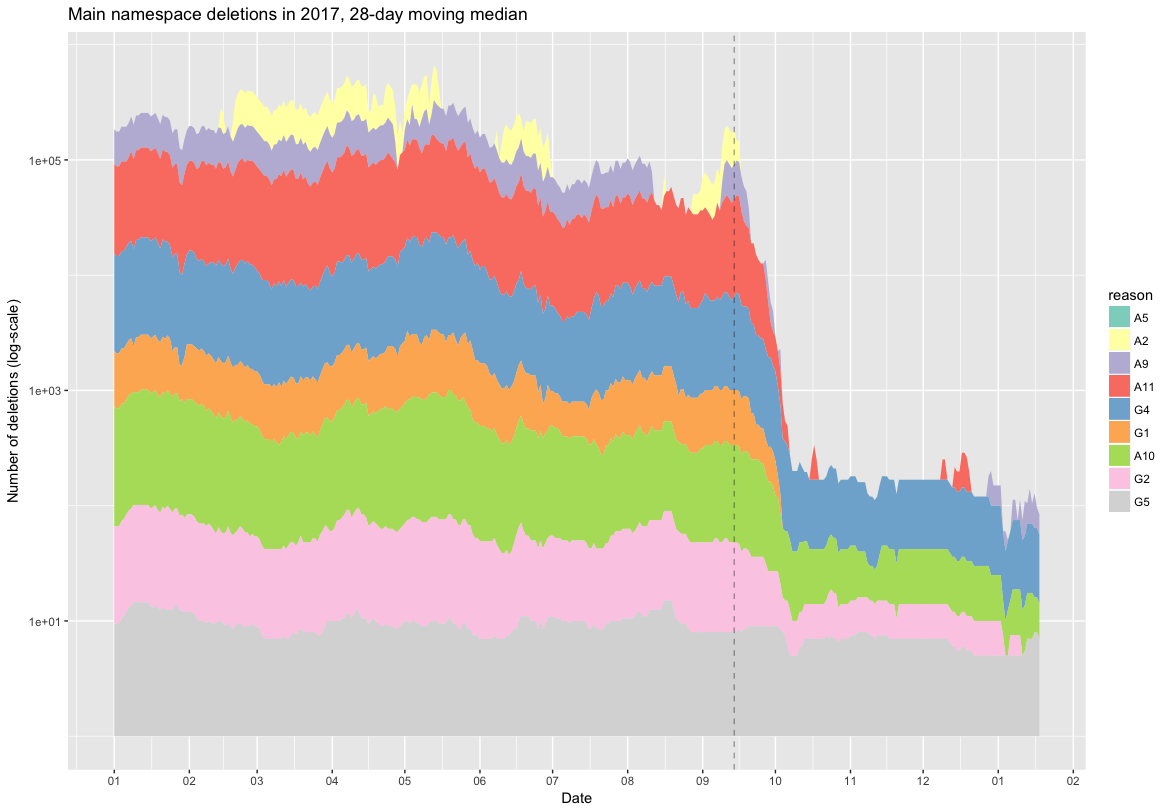
Graph showing reduction in AfDs following restrictions on article creation in 2017. The y-axis is log-scale and correct units are "pages deleted in the Main namespace."

Disagreements over the deletion of articles, and other types of encyclopedic content (e.g., categories and lists), are managed through discussion structures. Notably, Wikipedia (English) has had more than 400,000 Articles for Deletion (AfD) discussions since 2004, though the rate of AfD submissions has declined after Wikipedia article creation was restricted in 2017.

As of 2018, roughly 64 percent of debates ended in deletion and 24 percent in keeping the article, a ratio that is much lower than the early years of Wikipedia. Nearly all discussions are "closed" by a Wikipedian administrator. In 2019, researchers Mayfield and Black created an NLP model to forecast AfD outcomes. Consistent with previous research, they found that the first "vote" (i.e., comment) can generate a "herd effect" and predict outcomes 20 percent or more over the baseline.

Deletion disputes vary among the language Wikipedias. In English Wikipedia, about 20 percent of AfD comments justify their stance with a policy, compared to less than 3 percent in German and Turkish Wikipedia. Long-time Wikipedians play an outsized role in deletion disputes. Although over 160,000 users had spoken up in AfD discussions, over half the debate comments were made by only 1,218 users. This dominance of veteran editors has increased over time.

== Contentious topics ==
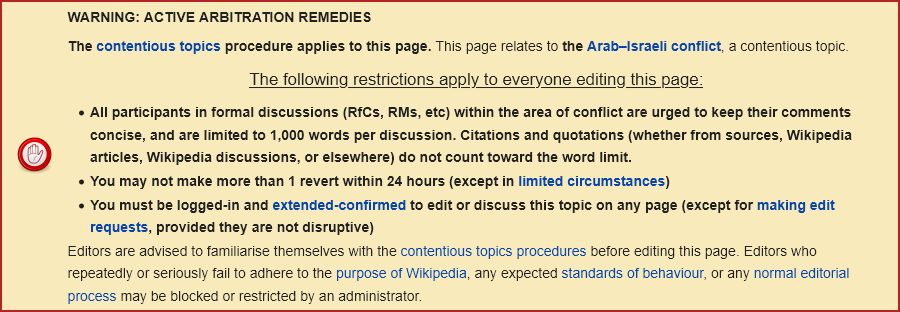
A talk page notice warning editors of the Arab–Israeli conflict, a contentious topic, and accompanying ArbCom-placed restrictions

In English and several other Wikipedias, an Arbitration Committee (ArbCom) handles a variety of intractable disputes, including conflicts among users who edit multiple articles within a topic. The Committee itself defines such a situation as a "contentious topic" and its sanctions may apply expansively to all articles with the topic. Disputes within contentious topics are a distinct area of research, some based on ArbCom cases and others on quantifiable variables.

Some topics appear to be unavoidably polarizing, such as abortion and climate change, although the level of editor conflict may not match the degree of public debate. In addition, a topic may be contentious in one language Wikipedia and not another. A 2014 study identified Israel, Adolf Hitler, The Holocaust, and God as the most hotly debated articles across 10 languages.

Editors have been found to line up in rival camps over contentious articles and topics. It is unclear how much such editors coordinate outside of the Wikipedia platform, contrary to Wikipedia policy. Apparent editor coordination can be detected through discourse analysis, such as the 2020 study of 1,206 contentious articles that found "contentious Wikipedia articles seem to clearly partition others into friends (those who have the same opinion on a given topic) and enemies." At the same time, Wikipedians can enhance their reputations with successful editing, which can influence other editors into like-minded approaches to a contentious topic. The most reputable editors tend to write lasting content and they are less involved in disputes.

In an analysis of 5,414 editor profiles, two types of rival camps were discerned: those whose viewpoints tended to be subsumed and those that tended to be maintained. Those found to "win" an edit war were more likely to ban opposing editors, revert edits, remove competing wikilinks, cite Wikipedia policies, show disrespect, be active in ArbCom proceedings, and especially exert control over cited references. Researchers expressed surprise that Wikipedia policies, designed to ensure balanced viewpoints, were instead leveraged to favor one point-of-view in contentious articles.

Looking at two contentious topics in French Wikipedia, Shroud of Turin and Sigmund Freud, researchers noticed a shift in focus from the editors' conflicting opinions to their disagreements over encyclopedic sources (e.g., are they scientific) and fellow editors (e.g., did they read the sources). Editors argued in adversarial, not collaborative, ways because of personal, non-encyclopedic goals, such as religious commitments, beyond Wikipedia. With Freud, the split among editors could be explained in terms of their competing epistemologies. However, the Shroud of Turin article was vulnerable to the meta-fallacy of bothsideism, according to the case study authors, because the "tenacity" of religious Wikipedians "might simply aim to enable other believers to continue to do so, by illustrating possible lines of argumentative defense, that indeed seem unending".

In a case study of two post-colonial topics, Algeria vs. France, and Gran Colombia vs. Spain, scholars found that the most active, presumably reputable, editors suffered the fewest deletions of their writing. Moreover, evidence suggested that fewer deletions were made by those who make use of Talk pages, as recommended by Wikipedia policy. The two ingroups with the most Wikipedians — France and Gran Colombia — were more likely to delete contributions by their presumed opposition — from Algeria and Spain, respectively.

== Dispute resolution ==
Mediation Committee logo

Soon after its founding, Wikipedia provided avenues to resolve content and conduct disputes. Just as editing disputes are difficult to define precisely, scholars have disagreed about identifying when disputes are resolved. Yasseri et al. categorized articles into three levels of disputation: "Consensus", "Sequence of temporary consensuses", and "Never-ending wars".

For content disagreements, Wikipedia has experimented with a variety of mechanisms. Experienced editors have been found to reduce reverts by citing Wikipedia policies, especially "Neutral point of view" (NPOV), "Consensus", and "No original research". Editing disagreements may be resolved by argumentation, compromise, and explaining previous discussions. As of 2024, editors may pursue dispute resolution by requesting a third party opinion, an informal arrangement intended for two editors in disagreement.

If their dispute remains unresolved, another recourse is the Dispute Resolution Noticeboard (DRN). The DRN approach does not offer formal closure or a binding compromise, but many cases are rejected for not pursuing other avenues, so it has become less useful. Of 2,520 DRN cases through mid-2020, there were 237 successful resolutions, 149 failures, and 2,134 (85%) closed without a result.

Moreover, editors may submit content disagreements into the Requests for Comment (RfC) system. These requests, circulated to uninvolved editors by a bot, benefit from the RfC's distinctive structure and the imposition of a 30-day deadline. During a seven year period, (English) Wikipedia had over 7,300 requests for comment discussions. RfC discussions are often closed with a Wikipedia-style "consensus" on the content dispute. However, a significant number "go stale" because they are ignored by veteran editors or, conversely, the RfCs are overwhelmed with comments and too complex or controversial to be closed.

In the past, editors in unresolved content disputes could file for formal mediation by a Mediation Committee, which was discontinued due to inactivity in 2018. Dispute resolution was also provided by informal groups such as the "Mediation Cabal". A 2010 study, cited by Ren et al., found that "mediators can alter the text discussion between conflicting editors (e.g., by striking through some statements), clarify ambiguity, differentiate between personal and substantive arguments, and show the editors how their exchanges could be made more constructive. They can also help manage temporal discontinuities (i.e., when one party is unavailable, the other party may make misattributions), and reduce power differences among editors."

For user conduct issues, in 2003, Jimmy Wales created the Arbitration Committee (ArbCom), an overarching authority for binding resolution of conduct disputes. ArbCom cases are structured in a formal manner, though it tends to be flexible and informal as it works toward decisions. More than 500 complaints were submitted to ArbCom between 2004 through 2020. ArbCom examines evidence of misconduct but its decisions have been criticized for favoring the more socially effective parties.

== History of disputes on Wikipedia ==
One of the first large-scale disputes about Wikipedia was an internal argument over advertising, starting with Larry Sanger and dissent by Spanish editors, which led to a 2002 fork of the Spanish Wikipedia. Edit warring gave rise to the rule against three repeated reverts by the same editor. In 2005–2006, Wikipedians debated whether to display controversial images from the Jyllands-Posten Muhammad cartoons. On internal matters, early disputes included the 2006 userbox controversy, which was resolved partly by placing templates in personal user pages and partly by administration actions by Jimmy Wales.

Meanwhile, in its first decade, Wikipedia set up dispute resolution mechanisms, including the Arbitration Committee, and refined policies to govern and reduce disputes. In its second decade, the Wikimedia Foundation funded and tracked research on disputes. Some Wikipedia dispute resolution efforts were disbanded. A Universal Code of Conduct for all Wikipedia organizations is designed to restrain the most egregious actions, some of which may arise from editing disputes.

== See also ==
- Ideological bias on Wikipedia
- List of edit wars on Wikipedia
- List of Wikipedia controversies (including some disputes among Wikipedia editors)
