= Universal basic income in India =

Universal basic income in India refers to the debate and practical experiments with universal basic income (UBI) in India. The greatest impetus has come from the 40-page chapter on UBI that the Economic Survey of India published in January 2017. It outlined the three themes of a proposed UBI programme:

- Universality - intent of providing every citizen "a basic income to cover their needs"
- Unconditionality - accessibility of all to basic income, without any means tests
- Agency - citizen's independent ability to choose how they spend their income

The survey mentions that UBI "liberates citizens from paternalistic and clientelistic relationships with the state".

Several scholars, including Guy Standing and Pranab Bardhan, have expressed strong support of the implementation of UBI as an alternative to corrupt and ineffective existing social programmes in India. Organisations such as the Self Employed Women's Association (SEWA) and UNICEF have backed the proposal since launching the earlier 2010 UBI pilot programme in Madhya Pradesh, India.

== History ==
In 2016, the idea of a Universal Basic Income in India received significant attention by taking up over forty pages in the 2016–2017 India Economic Survey as a serious and feasible solution to India's poverty and a potential economic stimulus. In India, this was an idea that has been discussed for decades in both the public and private spheres. Discussion of UBI in India began due to concerns about technologically driven unemployment and poor results of current welfare programmes. Given India's sheer size, implementation of UBI would have to be state-administered. Supporters believe this large-scale welfare programme could be revolutionary and could provide a poverty alleviation blueprint for other developing countries. However, critics are wary of establishing such a wide-scale programme because it might undermine the fragile social security architecture, cause already employed workers to drop out of labor force and encourage idleness, and also encourage wasteful spending. In the forward, the Chief Economic Adviser Arvind Subramanian wrotes, "providing a Universal Basic Income (UBI) that has emerged as a raging new idea both in advanced economies and in India." In the chapter itself, he notes: "Universal Basic Income is a radical and compelling paradigm shift in thinking about both social justice and a productive economy. It could be to the twenty first century what civil and political rights were to the twentieth."

From June 2011 to November 2012, Self Employed Women's Association (SEWA) and the United Nations Children's Fund (UNICEF), launched two pilot programmes to examine the impact of unconditional, monthly transfers through a modified and controlled trial. The pilot programme was notable in three main ways. First, it was universal, meaning that every individual test subject, irrespective of gender, ethnicity, or level of wealth, received a cash transfer. Second, these grants were provided beyond the existing welfare program, meaning it was not a substitute to payments which were already received. Third, these two pilot programmes were the latest of the eight UBI pilots which have been conducted around the world. Furthermore, these pilot programmes were one of the first in Asia and the second experiment to be conducted in the developing world.

During the global COVID-19 pandemic of 2020 and 2021, there has been several new articles in the Indian press. In June and July 2020 C. Rangarajan, former chairman of the Economic Advisory Council to the Prime Minister and S. Mahendra Dev, director and vice-chancellor, IGIDR, Mumbai, published an article arguing that India now must do two things, above all. The health care system must be improved, and there must be a robust system to provide minimum income support to all the poor, all the weak and vulnerable in society. For the purpose of minimising poverty they propose a basic income of Rs 4,000 annually, but only to women above 20. That would cost, according to their calculations, Rs 1.72 lakh crore or 0.84 per cent of GDP. Apart from that they also propose an expansion of the MGNREGA system in rural areas and to introduce an employment guarantee programme in urban areas.

=== Pilot programmes ===
==== Government experiments ====
Indian policymakers conducted two important studies testing the impact of unconditional cash transfers in Madhya Pradesh and Delhi. The first study conducted from January to December 2011 in New Delhi tested the impact of cash transfers when offered in conjunction with existing public welfare. The Indian government in partnership with SEWA and the Madhya Pradesh state government, carried out a controlled trial. This experiment gave 100 randomly selected households 1,000 rupees per month. The money was deposited under the name of the female head of participating households in a bank. A more ambitious version of this study took place in Madhya Pradesh as a two pilot programme.

Madhya Pradesh, state in India

==== SEWA programme ====
In 2009, the Self Employed Women's Associations (SEWA) began organising pilot programmes to test the effect of an unconditional cash transfer in Madhya Pradesh, one of India's least developed states. SEWA is a trade union that was established in 1972 to promote the rights of self-employed, low income women throughout India. Its mission is to improve the standards of living for women in India and help women achieve full employment. The purpose of the Madhya Pradesh Unconditional Cash Transfers Project (MPUCTP) is to test the potential for cash transfers to address vulnerabilities that low income Indians face. The unconditional cash transfer is a form of a universal basic income, as it provides a set allowance to all civilians in a village every month without any restrictions on what the money can be used for.

The MPUCTP, backed by funding from UNICEF and implemented by SEWA, consisted of two pilot programmes in 2011 and 2012, both in Madhya Pradesh, a rural area in which SEWA tried to alleviate poverty and inequality. In the first pilot, which lasted 17 months, 20 similar villages were chosen. In eight villages, everyone received grants and in the remaining 12, no one did. In half of all the villages, regardless of whether a village received a grant or not, there were SEWA representatives present to monitor the village. These test villages had similar variables of socio-economic levels, service access, geographical location, and similar infrastructure. In the second pilot, which lasted 12 months, two similar tribal villages were chosen. Everyone in one village received grants and no one in the other village received anything. Between both pilots, over 6,000 individuals received cash transfers. In both pilots, every man, woman, and child in the selected villages were given a moderate unconditional cash grant: 200 per adult per month and 100 per child per month for 12 months. After 12 months, their grants were raised to 300 and 150, respectively, per month for 6 months. A child's grant was given to its mother or other designated guardian. These amounts accounted for 20 to 30 percent of a monthly income for a low income family.

To distribute money to families without bank accounts, SEWA used "door-step" banking. Some villagers were suspicious of SEWA giving "free money", fearing later conditions. SEWA could not directly address these issues and were dependent upon time and understanding.

On May 30 and 31 of 2013, SEWA presented its preliminary findings from the studies at a conference on "Unconditional Cash Transfers: Findings from Two pilot studies" in Delhi. The findings show numerous improvements in health, productivity, and financial stability. In terms of impacts to health, the unconditional cash transfers were associated with better food security and lower rates of malnutrition in female children. Less food deficiency improved children nutrition and led to more balanced diets. Recipient villages had lower rates of illness, more consistent medical treatment, and more consistent medicine intake. Families receiving cash transfers had more livestock, which helped improve health and financial stability. Additionally, productivity rates increased, as children in recipient villages had higher rates of school attendance. Villages receiving cash transfers had higher expenditures on schooling and agricultural inputs, promoting better education and higher agricultural yields. Some concerns of the universal basic income are that it will discourage labor and encourage consumption of alcohol. However, cash recipients had higher rates of labor and work, especially in self- employed contexts. And, there was no evidence of higher alcohol consumption in recipient villages than control villages; in fact, in the recipient tribal village, alcohol consumption actually decreased. The effect on labor productivity was especially strong for women and tribal communities. Financial stability improved significantly in villages receiving cash transfers. Households with cash grants were three times more likely to open a new business or take on a new production activity than households that did not receive the cash transfer. These households also decreased their indebtedness and increased their savings, and some were even able to open bank accounts to remit the cash grants.

One important factor not addressed in the study was the impact of environmental hazards on the sustainability of the project and, thus, the larger universal income idea. Although the positive results of the pilot programmes were overwhelming, the long-run impacts of such short term (12–18 months) projects cannot be measured. The results of the pilot programme disprove many criticisms of the programme, but further investigation and experimentation is necessary to test the feasibility of a universal basic income for India.

==== 2025 ====
As of mid-2025, nearly 15 Indian states and Union Territories had launched unconditional cash transfer programmes for women, a significant expansion from just two states in 2022–23, according to a June 2025 issue brief by the Observer Research Foundation. These included Goa (the first, in 2013), Assam, West Bengal, Madhya Pradesh, Karnataka, Tamil Nadu, Telangana, Chhattisgarh, Jharkhand, Maharashtra, Odisha, Himachal Pradesh, and Delhi. The BBC estimated that 118 million women in the twelve states were receiving the cash transfers, typically for ₹1,000–₹2,500 per month. Most of the women receiving the cash in West Bengal in 2023 and in Maharashtra in 2025 controlled the money themselves. Those in West Bengal typically spent the money on food, education, and health. According to research by Prabha Kotiswaran, Gale Andrew, and Madhusree Jana, evidence was not found for two feminist arguments proposed against women's basic income: the possibilities of the income discouraging women from looking for paid work or reinforcing gender roles.

== Arguments for, against, and around basic income in India ==
Since 2016 there has been significant discussion and debate surrounding the idea of implementing a UBI in India. Through these talks, several politicians, economists, and leading national figures have raised the following arguments surrounding UBI and its potential effects for the country. Although UBI in India has been extensively discussed, specific policies surrounding the UBI in India is yet to be determined and enforced.

=== Arguments for ===
==== Emancipatory value ====
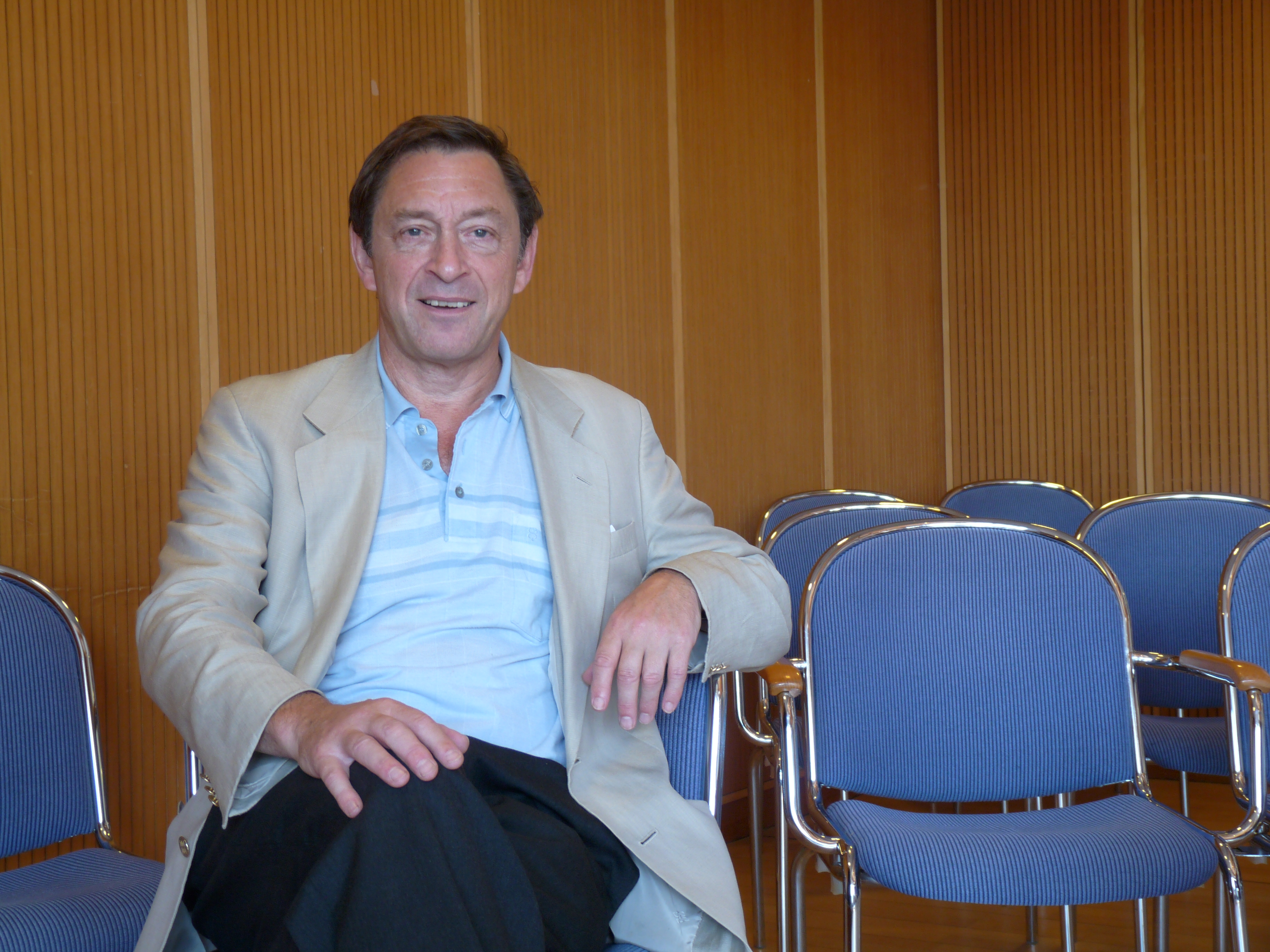
Guy Standing, economist who has been involved in the basic income experiments in India

Guy Standing has argued, based on SEWA's 2010–2013 Madhya Pradesh basic income pilot, that the emancipatory value of basic income exceeds its monetary value where money itself is a scarce commodity. The emancipatory value is, according to Standing, greater because basic income has effects on the economic security of the receivers that goes beyond the increase in their income. He identifies four explanations for such effects: 1) While the basic income was used to reduce debt, it was also used to accumulate savings to be used in the case of sickness or other emergencies. In SEWA's basic income pilot the propensity to save was significantly higher among those who received the basic income. 2) The basic income reduced the level and severity of indebtedness beyond the monetary value of the basic income by giving household access to credit on better terms. For example, it decreased the dependency on expensive loans from an oligopolistic money lending class by enabling friends and relatives to offer loans to each other. Moreover, the basic income provided incentives for moneylenders to offer lower interest rates and aided households in avoiding taking on new loans. 3) On a community level, basic income may induce entrepreneurial efforts by reducing the consequences of failure. This may, in the long run, be beneficial for the economic security of a village as a whole. 4) Basic income increased the resilience to economic shocks by enabling collective responses to individual hazards. Furthermore, basic income functions as a secure source of revenue in times of economic insecurity.

==== UBI versus Indian public distribution system ====
Guy Standing argues that contrary to IPDS (Indian Public Distribution System), a basic income does not limit the choice of the recipient to a set of subsidised goods. Moreover, IPDS entails a higher cost associated with the distribution of goods which must be stored and transported by a branch of the government. This is particularly costly due to the decentralised nature of the ration shops currently characterising Indian rural life. Standing also points to certain costs related to shortcomings of the current scheme. For instance, the provision of subsidized grain is in some cases uncertain, potentially putting families under the burden of debt, and women must in some cases spend hours singling out good grains from bad. These are, according to Standing, costs that a basic income, with its more decentralised structure, may reduce or avoid.

==== Basic income to empower women ====
There are two qualifications that uniquely position India for the implementation of a universal basic income (UBI) - the lack of women in the public labor force and the presence of a large informal sector.

First, the UBI would help Indian women gain greater financial independence and thus enhance gender equality. In 2018, about 75% of adult Indian women are not employed in jobs outside of the home; without a source of income they are financially dependent on their husbands or families. If family relationships become strained, women often have nowhere else to go and are forced to remain in the difficult situation. Their lack of income constraints many women from making their own choices, even in situations of abuse and violence. A UBI would give these women some measure of autonomy.

==== Benefits for the informal work sector ====
Second, a UBI would uniquely benefit India because of its large informal sector. More than 90% of the Indian population works in the informal sector; the informal sector includes all businesses of less than 10 workers that are not taxed or monitored by government authorities. This segment of the workforce receives no benefits or pensions, and hence informal sector workers have no access to retirement savings, health benefits, or financial security. Although this is especially prominent in rural India, even without accounting for the agricultural sectors of the economy, more than 80% of the Indian population is still employed in informal sector jobs. A UBI would enable this large part of the population to have some financial security in the case of unemployment, health issues, or any other extenuating circumstance.

==== Financial inclusion ====
Incorporating UBI through direct transfers would bring more people into the formal banking system. This also increases rural access to formal credit. This is a huge positive for farmers as they often gets trapped by informal credit indebtedness.

=== Arguments against ===
The biggest concern against the distribution of UBI is a worry for conspicuous spending, especially for males of the household on drugs, gambling or alcohol since most rural bank account holders are male. Another concern is a reduction of labour supply, since an insured income would lead people to work fewer hours. This theory, however, has been disproven in a study done by Banerjee, Hanna, Kreindler and Olken in 2015 who conducted a meta-analysis of government cash transfer programmes in Honduras, Morocco, Mexico, Philippines, Indonesia and Nicaragua and found that there was no significant drop in the workforce due to these programmes: "They find no significant reduction in labour supply (inside and outside the household) for men or women from the provision of cash transfers." Similar results derived from an experiment in few villages in Madhya Pradesh, India. Another argument Gender disparity (Since more males have financial access). Other arguments against UBI is the costs imposed on banks in carrying out UBI since it would require more workers and more hours required to implement the system. Lastly, there is also a claim that replacing things like food programmes with UBI would expose the population to more market risks. Price fluctuation will affect the purchasing power of the consumer.

=== Arguments around ===
==== Work unconditionality ====
A key concern is with the "work unconditionality" of the basic income proposal by which the income is paid no matter a person's employment status. Some believe money should not be given to those who do not contribute to society through their labor. Many fear that the unemployed would spend basic income money on items like alcohol, cigarettes and other addictive goods. Another related prevailing fear is that a universal basic income will deter people from working or seeking work altogether.

==== Universality ====
A very common concern regarding the UBI is whether or not it should be distributed to rich as well to the poor. Most advocates argue that it should be a universal and basic right for every citizen. Its function as a payment to everyone, rich and poor, is the very premise of its universality as opposed to just a basic income. Furthermore, many agree that the methods for determining who would and would not qualify are costly and time-consuming (open to corruption and system leaks) and risk leaving out too many needy individuals. They note that a UBI can be an effective safety net for anyone who encounters a crisis, including those who are middle class. However, there might be resistance to the wealthy gaining benefit of UBI.

Another reason for making the basic income universal is more logistical. In order to segment the population and ensure that the correct people are receiving the benefits without corruption a large amount of administrative labor is required, in addition to infrastructure and technology in place to support it. To this extent, universalising is important because the potential for misallocation and corruption with targeting is considered too great by many. In this manner, there would be no administrative labor required to define and operate the poor from the non-poor. In this way, the result of universalising is beneficial for the state and its people.

The question to consider is how can we fairly determine this data and ensure equal distribution while not putting too much strain on the administration. There have been issues in the past with allocation of well fare programmes such as targeting and misallocation. It is tough to try and target only the poor and deserving. Whether it was self-reporting or more multidimensional – identification criteria, or government audits, there has been criticism from many sides and reports of corruption. As for misallocation, many deserving households are excluded from welfare schemes due to misallocation. "For instance, consider the states of Bihar, Madhya Pradesh, Rajasthan, Orissa and Uttar Pradesh: despite accounting for over half the poor in the country, these states access only a third of the resources spent on the MGNREGS in 2015–2016" MGNREGS is a welfare scheme. However, this issue is easier to resolve if UBI is implemented through direct deposits rather than through state allocation of funding.

==== Alternatives ====
Other options are being considered and proposed. One idea is to target certain populations instead of giving an income to the entire population. This idea is resisted by others for whom the universality is a fundamental and inviolable principle of the basic income. In order to reduce GDP expenditure on UBI, alternative proposals have been made. Other options for a more targeted programme have been aired: The first is an "opt out" system in which the wealthiest 25% of India are given the option of withdrawing. The names of those in the top 25% who choose to remain in the programme would be published, as a shaming device. Another option is to target specifically marginalised and vulnerable groups such as the disabled or widowed. Another option is providing UBI as a choice to beneficiaries of other programmes. People who receive other benefits would have the choice between opting in for UBI instead. There have also been considerations of UBI for Women as women are worse of in employment opportunities, education and financial inclusion. Finally, there is an option of starting UBI for urban areas because they have bank accounts, have access to banks vs rural populations, the infrastructure is tricky and they mostly have allocations through state.

== Funding strategies ==
Something to consider is whether the universal basic income in India is financially feasible. Research indicates that in order to implement the UBI, existing welfare programmes would have to be terminated to free up resources. This raises questions, especially about the Indian government's large programmes such as the Food Subsidy or Public Distribution System (PDS) and the Mahatma Gandhi National Rural Employment Guarantee Scheme (MGNREGS) which would have to be stopped for the UBI to be implemented. Current social welfare schemes cost India about 3.7% of GDP, but UBI is expected to cost 4.9% of GDP. The question of where this extra funding will come from remains.

== Prominent advocates ==
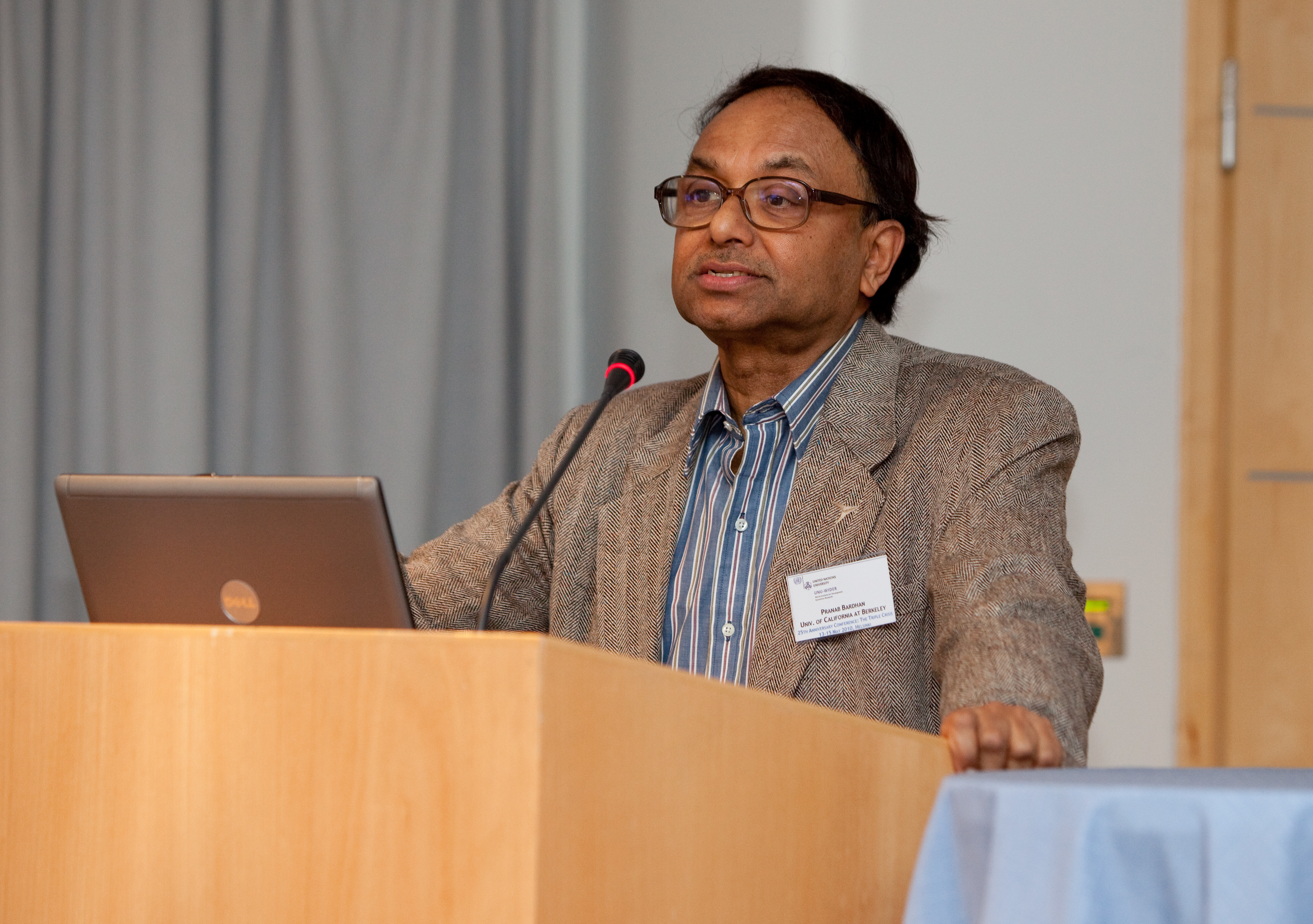
Professor of Economics Pranab Bardhan

Guy Standing, is a professorial research associate and former professor of development studies at SOAS University of London, and co-author of Basic Income: A Transformative Policy for India, who claims basic income is a "matter of social justice." Among Standing's co-authors are other advocates such as Sarath Davala, an independent sociologist, who, in his 2017 Tedx Talk, expressed support for unconditional basic income due its emancipatory effects. Renana Jhabvala, a long-serving leader of the Self-Employed Women's Association (SEWA) who served as its elected Secretary and later as president of SEWA Bharat, and who facilitated the basic income pilot programme, advocates for basic income as "a social policy whose time has come." Pranab Bardhan, a professor of economics at the University of California, Berkeley, explains that "basic income may very well be fiscally feasible – not to mention socially desirable – in places where the poverty threshold is low and existing social safety nets are both threadbare and expensive to administer." Indian politician Baijayant Panda has also advocated for basic income in India, explaining that "India may be actually be a better case for a basic income" compared to other nations. In 2019, the Indian National Congress announced the NYAY (Nyuntam Aay Yojana) scheme in its election manifesto, Vikas Singh, an Indian economist and advocate of basic income, spoke in his TedX talk about equality being the bedrock of democracy.

== See also ==
- Poverty in India
- Income in India
- Universal basic income around the world
- List of basic income models
- Guaranteed minimum income
