= List of edit wars on Wikipedia =

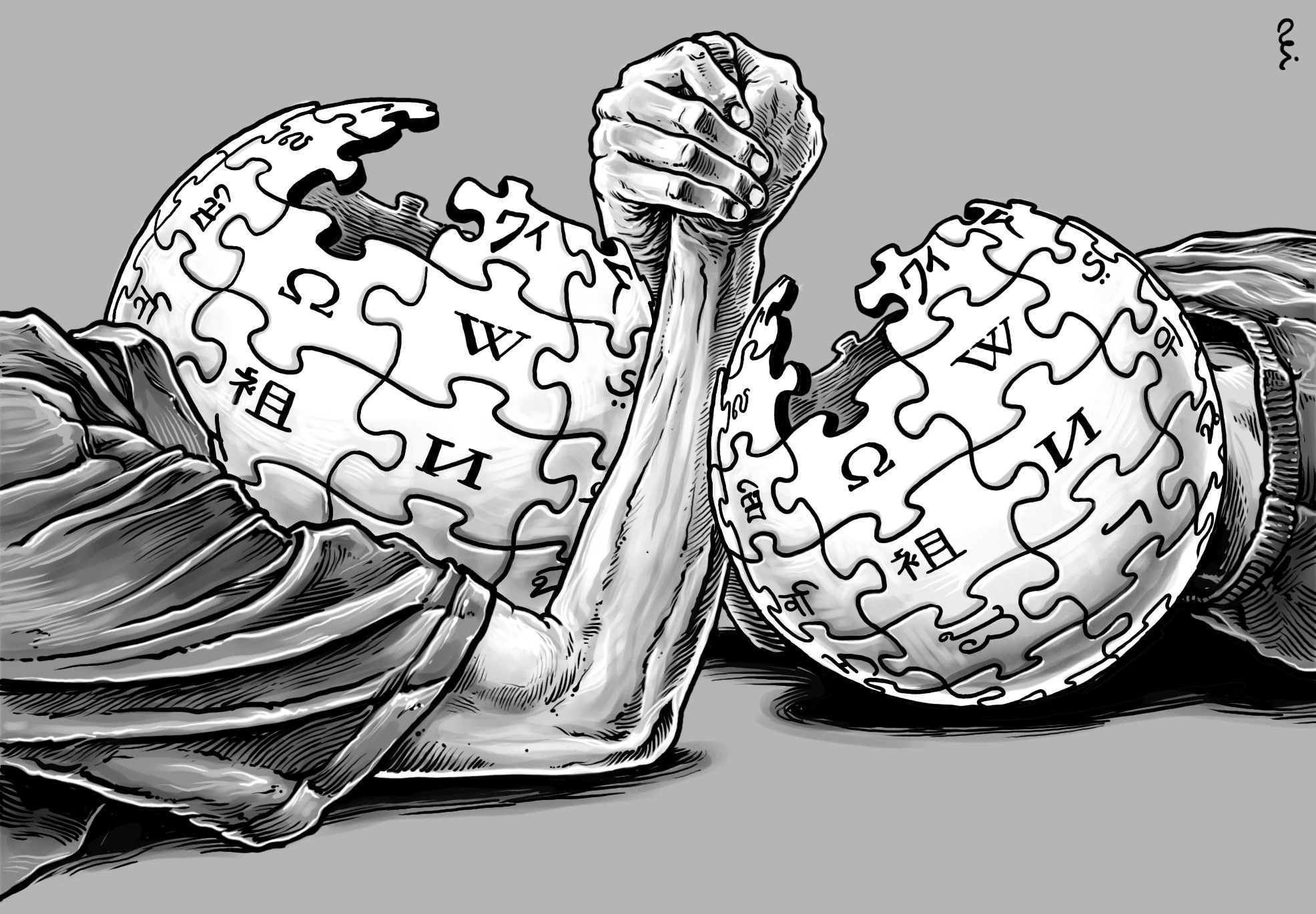
Representation of edit wars on Wikipedia by Czech illustrator Pavel Reisenauer

Disputes on Wikipedia between editors, concerning content within articles, may give rise to edit wars—in which there is a repeated exchange of opposing edits made to a contested article. Some edit wars have received media and academic attention.

== Background ==
Wikipedia is a free, collaborative, online encyclopedia which allows its users to write articles and edit them via wiki software. The website provides a user-friendly interface for both editing on articles and reversing other users' edits. Conflicts over content within articles often arise among editors, which may result in edit wars. An edit war is a persistent exchange of edits representing conflicting views on a contested article, or as defined by the website's policy: "when editors who disagree about the content of a page repeatedly override each other's edits." Edit wars are prohibited on Wikipedia and editors are encouraged to seek consensus through discussion; however, administrative intervention may be applied if discussion is unfruitful in resolving the conflict. Generally, edit wars are provoked by the presence of highly controversial content, such as abortion or the Israeli–Palestinian conflict, but can also occur due to other disputed matters, such as the nationality of artist Francis Bacon.

== Edit wars ==
Various edit wars have received coverage outside the website, and media articles noting several such wars have been published.

Article	Edition	Start date	End date	Description	Outcome	Refs.
Gdańsk	English Wikipedia	Dec 24, 2003	Mar 4, 2005	Whether to use the German name, Danzig, or the current official name of the Polish city, Gdańsk, was a subject of dispute and edit warring.	A vote was held to determine the choice of name, with 80 editors casting 657 votes in two weeks. A clear majority of votes decided on the Polish-language name on the modern city, while references to the city in the period from 1793 to 1945 would use the German name.	
Yogurt	English Wikipedia	Dec 25, 2003	c. 2012	Editors conflicted over the spelling used in the title of the article, with some promoting the American English yogurt and others the British English spelling yoghurt.	Consensus was established in 2012 to title the article yogurt, and to note variant spellings in the article's lead sentence.	
Ganges	English Wikipedia	c. 2006	Ongoing	The name used for the river, whether Ganges (familiar to English speakers in Western countries) or Ganga (familiar to English speakers in India) has been contested.	—N/a	
Star Trek Into Darkness (Note: Main article: Wikipedia Star Trek Into Darkness debate)	English Wikipedia	c. Dec 2012 (Note: In January 2013, the Daily Dot stated that the war had raged for "nearly two months.")	Feb 21, 2013	The capitalization of into in Star Trek Into Darkness was a matter of debate as some wished to have it capitalized and others preferred "Star Trek into Darkness."	Consensus was reached that the article be titled Star Trek Into Darkness, with a capitalized into.	
Gamergate	English Wikipedia	c. Aug 2014	c. 2015	Various editors accused the article covering the harassment campaign of having bias towards a feminist viewpoint.	Following a decision by the Arbitration Committee of the English Wikipedia, several editors were banned from editing on articles relating to sex and gender. Although this decision did not end the edit war, the harassment campaign lost momentum during 2015.	
Guy Standing (economist)	English Wikipedia	c. Feb 2015	Unclear	Various editors have debated whether or not "Guy Standing sitting" was an appropriate caption for Standing's portrait photo. While some users claimed it was an accurate description of the image, others denounced it as distracting wordplay.	As of 2026, the consensus is to exclude "sitting" from the caption. Furthermore, a different photo was chosen as Standing's portrait, only showing him from the shoulders up. A screenshot of the original photo and caption, along with a paragraph about the edit war, are included on Standing's page.	
Heights of presidents and presidential candidates of the United States	English Wikipedia	c. 2016	Apr 25, 2026	Various users made conflicting edits about the height of Donald Trump and about whether or not he is taller than Lyndon B. Johnson and Abraham Lincoln.	All edits that have put Donald Trump as being taller than Lyndon B. Johnson or Abraham Lincoln, or have made Donald Trump's height taller or shorter than 6 ft 3 in (190 cm) have been reverted.	
Garfield (character)	English Wikipedia	Feb 24, 2017	Feb 27, 2017 (Note: The Washington Post states that edit warring on Garfield's gender occurred for "2½ days" before administrative intervention.)	The infobox of the cartoon cat Garfield, protagonist of the Garfield comic strip, was changed multiple times to indicate an indeterminate gender, after podcaster Virgil Texas claimed in a tweet that an interview of strip creator Jim Davis indicated so and subsequently updated the infobox to reflect this.	The argument ended in the consensus that Garfield was male, citing four strips. Jim Davis later clarified to The Washington Post that he was indeed male.	
Donald Trump	English Wikipedia	Jul 16, 2018	Jul 26, 2018	Various editors wished to emphasize criticism of Trump's comments during the 2018 Russia–United States Summit.	After a vote "which clarified little," Wikipedia admin Awilley concluded the discussion with the article noting bipartisan criticism of Trump's comments.	
History of the Jews in Poland	English Wikipedia	May 15, 2019	Jun 4, 2019	Editors disagreed over the reliability of sources regarding the degree of restitution offered to Jews who lost property in Poland during the Holocaust.	The article eventually reflected the sources which describe the restitution as minimal.	
Once Upon a Time in Hollywood	English Wikipedia	Jul 23, 2019	Jul 26, 2019	Several editors expressed backlash over the inclusion of movie spoilers in the article's plot summary prior to a more public release. The article was also repeatedly vandalized with erroneous plot summaries.	As public access to the film increased, editors swiftly resolved to include the entire plot.	
2019 Yuen Long attack	Chinese Wikipedia	c. Aug 2020	Sep 13, 2021	Pro-Beijing editors and pro-democracy editors dispute over various topics in the article, including the title's naming, the tone of the content, whether certain pictures or videos can be used, and whether sources such as the Apple Daily are reliable.	2021 Wikimedia Foundation actions on the Chinese Wikipedia: Pro-Beijing editors were blocked by the Wikimedia Foundation after being suspected of acting as agents of the government of China.	
Myles Turner	English Wikipedia	Nov 17, 2020	Nov 18, 2020	Following an intentional joke edit that remained for 30 minutes which claimed the basketball center had been traded by the Indiana Pacers to the Boston Celtics, over 200 vandalizing edits were made in the course of only about 2 hours.	The vandalizers were believed to be a large group of Boston Celtics fans. The edits resulted in countless editors (the vast majority unregistered or newcomers) being banned from Wikipedia.	
Recession	English Wikipedia	Jul 14, 2022	Jul 30, 2022	A dispute broke out among Wikipedia editors over the definition of an economic recession given in the article on that subject. Right-wing commentators accused editors on the platform of being influenced by the Biden administration's interpretation of the term, inciting further edit warring.	After the page was placed under protection from edits by new users, a consensus arose to explain the varied definition of the word among scholars and in common usage.	
Yasuke	English Wikipedia	May 15, 2024	Unclear	Following the announcement of Yasuke as a playable character in the video game Assassin's Creed Shadows, editors conflicted on if the historical Yasuke was ever granted samurai status.	The pages were put on extended confirmed protection on both wikis - edit war on jawiki was suppressed after consensus to impose a series of heavy local rules was reached on the page. As of February 2025, the jawiki page describes Yasuke as a retainer, not a samurai.	
Yasuke	Japanese Wikipedia	May 15, 2024	c. Sep 2024	Following the announcement of Yasuke as a playable character in the video game Assassin's Creed Shadows, editors conflicted on if the historical Yasuke was ever granted samurai status.	The pages were put on extended confirmed protection on both wikis - edit war on jawiki was suppressed after consensus to impose a series of heavy local rules was reached on the page. As of February 2025, the jawiki page describes Yasuke as a retainer, not a samurai.	
Nuseirat rescue and massacre	English Wikipedia	Jun 8, 2024	Oct 12, 2024	An edit war erupted concerning whether an Israeli military raid during the Gaza war should be titled a "massacre" or a "rescue operation."	A consensus emerged to merge the two titles under the single name of "Nuseirat rescue and massacre."	
Leon Schreiber	English Wikipedia	Jun 30, 2024	Jul 3, 2024	South African politician Leon Schreiber's article was edited multiple times over his birthplace and nationality. Schreiber was born in South Africa; however, several users changed the article to indicate he was born in Zimbabwe.	On July 3, the article was protected from arbitrary editing and his birthplace was stated as South Africa.	

== See also ==
- List of Wikipedia controversies
