= Guy Standing (economist) =

British labour economist (born 1948)

Guy Standing FAcSS FRSA
- Standing in 2025
- Born: Guy Maxwell Standing; 9 February 1948 (age 78); London, England

Academic background
- Education: University of Sussex (BA); University of Illinois, Urbana-Champaign (MA); University of Cambridge (PhD)
- Thesis: Labour Force Participation and Underdevelopment with Special Reference to Female Economic Activity (1978)

Academic work
- Discipline: Labour economist
- School or tradition: Basic Income Earth Network
- Institutions: Monash University; University of Bath; SOAS University of London
- Main interests: Universal basic income; Deliberative democracy
- Notable ideas: Theory of the precariat
- Standing's voice Standing talking about the precariat Recorded 19 September 2024
- Website: guystanding.com

Guy Maxwell Standing (born 9 February 1948) is a British labour economist. He is a professorial research associate at SOAS University of London. Standing co-founded the Basic Income Earth Network (BIEN) in 1986 and has written widely in the areas of labour economics, active labour market policies, unemployment, labour market flexibility, structural adjustment programs and social protection.

His best known book is the 2011 publication The Precariat: The New Dangerous Class, which has been translated into 25 languages. In it, Standing created the term "precariat" to describe an emerging class of workers who are harmed by low wages and poor job security as a consequence of globalisation.

After making The Precariat, his work has focused on the precariat, deliberative democracy, commons, and has become a major advocate of universal basic income. Standing was elected a fellow of the Academy of Social Sciences in 2009 and a fellow of the Royal Society of Arts in 2019.

== Life and career ==
Guy Maxwell Standing was born on 9 February 1948, in Greenwich, London. He gained his bachelor's degree in economics from the University of Sussex in 1971. After taking a masters in labour economics and industrial relations at the University of Illinois, he received his doctorate in economics from the University of Cambridge in 1978.

From 1975 to 2006, Standing worked at the International Labour Organization (ILO), latterly as director of the ILO's Socio-Economic Security Programme. The programme was responsible for a major report on socio-economic security worldwide and for creation of the Decent Work Index. In 1986, he co-founded the Basic Income Earth Network (BIEN), a group of individuals and organizations to advocate Universal Basic Income (UBI). It was one of the earliest groups to advocate UBI in its modern form.

From April 2006 to February 2009, he held a position of Professor of Labour Economics at Monash University in Melbourne, Australia. In 2006, he became professor of economic security at the University of Bath, leaving in 2013 to become professor of development studies at the School of Oriental and African Studies, University of London. Since October 2015, he has been a professorial research associate at SOAS.

From 2011 to 2012, Standing worked with Indian activist Renana Jhabvala to set up trials in the Indian state of Madhya Pradesh, in which more than 6,000 people were given a basic income. After working on topics relating to universal basic income in India, he wrote two books relating to the precariat, The Precariat: The New Dangerous Class (2011) and A Precariat Charter: From Denizens to Citizens (2014).

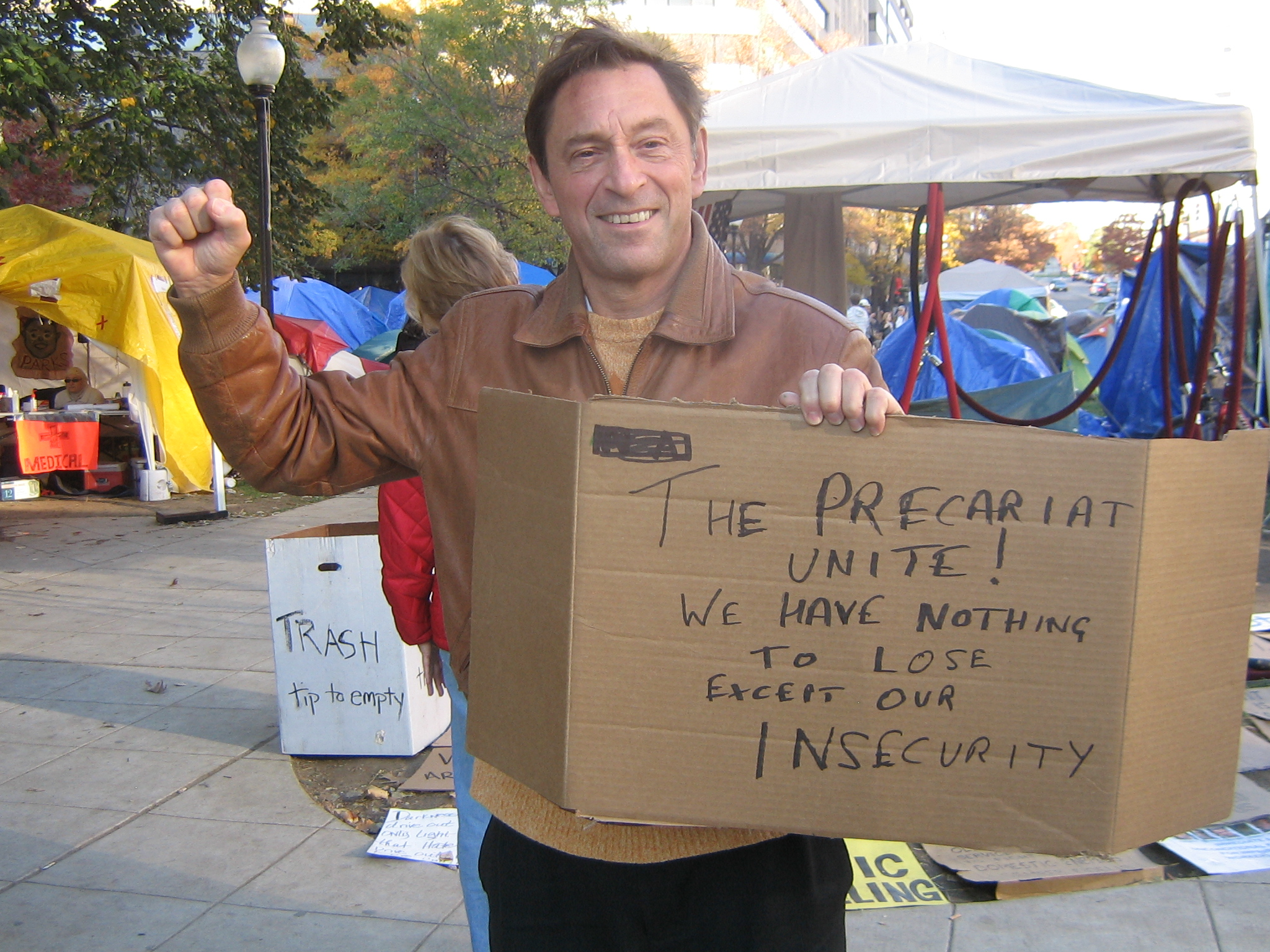
Standing at the Occupy D.C. protest in 2011

Standing's most-known book is The Precariat: The New Dangerous Class, published in 2011. In it, Standing coins the term "precariat" to refer to the class of people suffering from precarity and job insecurity, which he analyses as a new emerging social class, and blames globalisation for having plunged more and more people into the precariat. The book has been translated into 25 languages.

According to Standing, the precariat is not only suffering from job insecurity but also identity insecurity and lack of time control, not least due to workfare social policies. Standing describes the precariat as an agglomerate of several different social groups, notably immigrants, young educated people, and those who have fallen out of the old-style industrial working class. In his 2014 book entitled A Precariat Charter he argued that all citizens have a right to socially inherited wealth. After writing his book, Standing's work has focused on UBI, deliberative democracy, and the commons.

On 27 March 2015, 19 economists including Standing, Steve Keen, Ann Pettifor and Robert Skidelsky signed a letter to the Financial Times calling on the European Central Bank to adopt a more direct approach to its quantitative easing plan announced earlier in February. In 2020, Standing collaborated with the English band Massive Attack for their EP Eutopia. Standing was one of three political speakers for the EP, along with Christiana Figueres and Gabriel Zucman. Each of the album's tracks discusses a political issue; Standing's track is about universal basic income. In 2021, Standing was appointed deputy chair of the Welsh government’s advisory panel on a basic income pilot for care leavers in Wales.

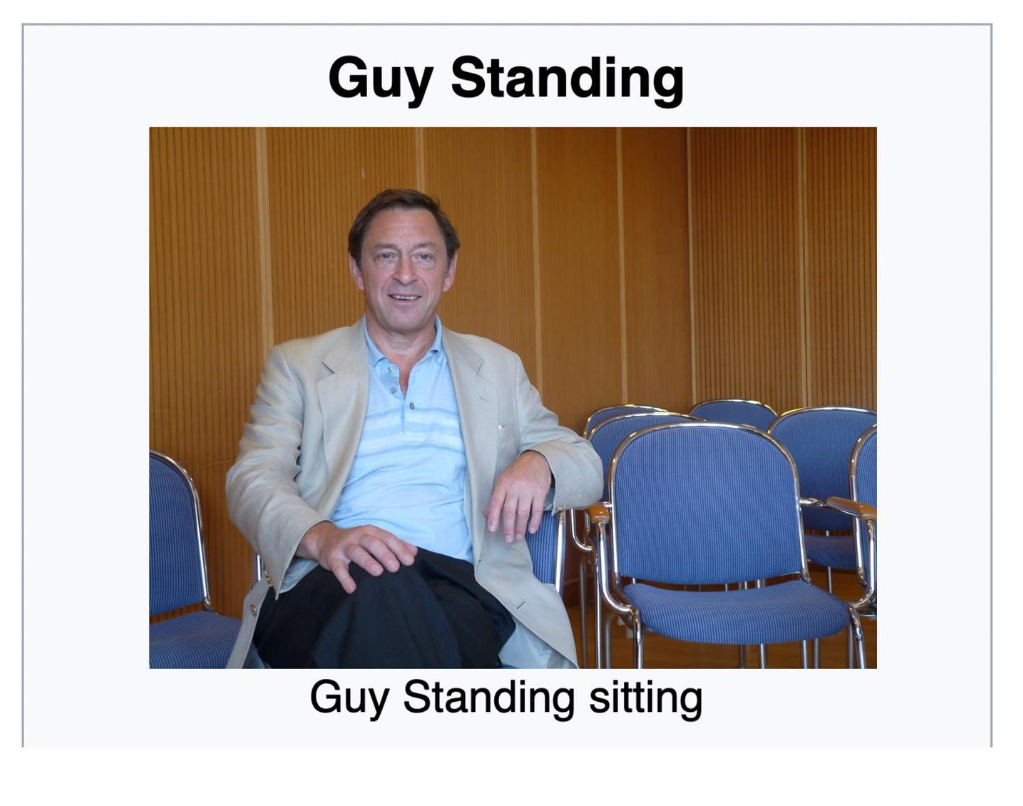
Screenshot from a version of Standing's English Wikipedia article c. 2015, which caused an edit war over its caption, and has become a viral internet meme

From February 2015, the image caption for Standing's English Wikipedia article was part of an edit war. Users debated whether the caption should read "Guy Standing sitting". A consensus formed to exclude the word "sitting". The controversy has become a viral internet meme. Annie Rauwerda, known for her social media accounts named Depths of Wikipedia, has cited the "Guy Standing sitting" image in many of her live shows about Wikipedia. In May 2022, Standing featured on the American podcast Reply All to discuss the "Guy Standing sitting" joke, saying that he hoped it drew people's attention to the serious message of his work.

== Views ==
Standing endorsed Jeremy Corbyn's campaign in the Labour Party leadership election in 2015 and endorsed Corbyn's campaign in the United Kingdom general election in 2017 and 2019. Standing calls for politicians to make social reforms towards ensuring financial security as a right. He argues for UBI as an important step to a new approach, (Note: Why the precariat requires a basic income (Prof. Guy Standing) (ENG) on YouTube Conference in Ljubljana. BKTVkanal (3 November 2012). Retrieved 4 July 2014.) stating that it would create more economic activity. According to Standing, if politicians fail to take the necessary actions, there would be a wave of anger, violence and a rise of far-right parties. In 2012, Standing noted that far-right groups are "growing very, very fast."

In his 2016 book, The Corruption of Capitalism: Why Rentiers Thrive and Work Does Not Pay, Standing said that rentier capitalism has become more predominant since the 1970s. In 2017, Standing described having basic income as a "matter of social justice." In 2019, Standing told the BBC the amount of money for UBI "would change over time as the funding for a basic income is built up." Standing predicts that the initial payment would be about £48 per week. In his 2019 book, Plunder of the Commons: A Manifesto for Sharing Public Wealth, Standing said that the post-Thatcher period was characterized by neoliberalism becoming dominant.

In the aftermath of the COVID-19 pandemic, Standing argued in 2021 that the pandemic's consequences showed that a universal basic income was "inevitable". Standing has also endorsed a carbon tax as a means to reduce greenhouse gas emissions. In May 2022, Standing echoes the same sentiment about basic income on his appearance on the Reply All podcast, saying that the right for UBI is a "realistic possibility".

== Membership and honours ==
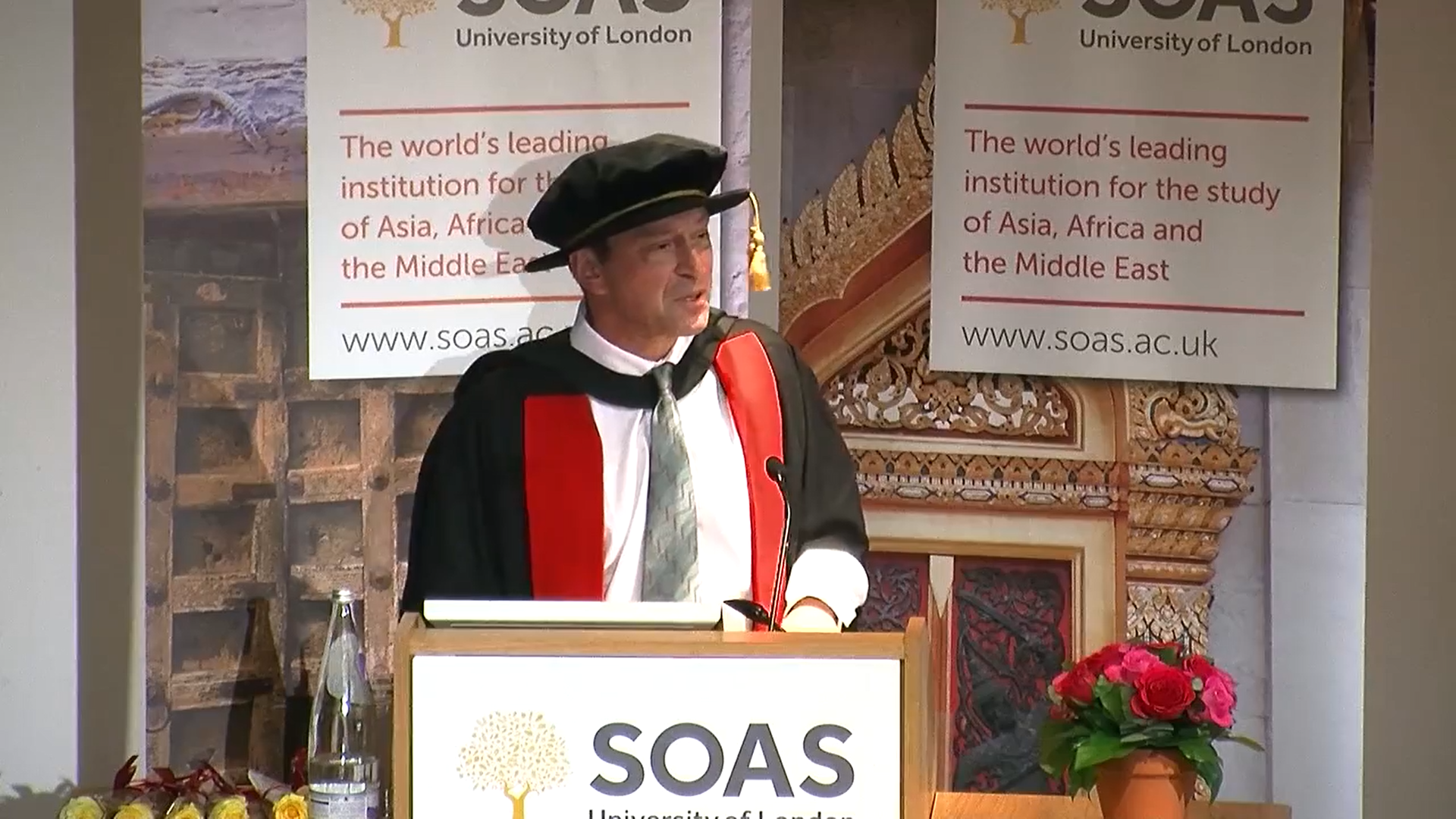
Standing speaking at SOAS University of London in 2013

Standing was elected Fellow of the Academy of Social Sciences in 2009. In 2019, Standing became a Fellow of the Royal Society of Arts. He was assigned an honorary professor at the University of Sydney. Standing is a member of the Progressive Economy Forum.

== Bibliography ==
- Labour Force Participation and Development. Geneva: International Labour Office. 1978. ISBN 9789221027621.
- Sheehan, Glen, ed. (1978). Labour Force Participation in Low-income Countries. Geneva: International Labour Office. ISBN 9789221018124.
- Szal, Richard (1979). Poverty and Basic Needs Evidence from Guyana and the Philippines. Geneva: International Labour Office. ISBN 9789221020349.
- Unemployment and Female Labour: A Study of Labour Supply in Kingston, Jamaica. London: Palgrave Macmillan UK. 1981. ISBN 9781349061488.
- Rodgers, Gerry (1981). Child Work, Poverty and Underdevelopment: Issues for Research in Low-Income Countries. Geneva: International Labour Office. ISBN 9789221028130.
- Peek, Peter (1982). State Policies and Migration: Studies in Latin America and the Caribbean. London: International Labour Office, World Employment Programme. ISBN 9781003459408.
- Bilsborrow, Richard E.; Oberai, A. S. (1984). Migration Surveys in Low-Income Countries: Guidelines for Survey and Questionnaire Design. London: Chapman & Hall. ISBN 9781041274940.
- Labour Circulation and the Labour Process. London: Croom Helm. 1985. ISBN 9780709933427.
- Unemployment and Labour Market Flexibility: The United Kingdom. Geneva: International Labour Office. 1986. ISBN 9789221052913.
- Unemployment and Labour Market Flexibility: Sweden. Geneva: International Labour Office. 1988. ISBN 9789221062653.
- Lilja, Reija; Santamäki-Vuori, Tuire (1990). Unemployment and Labour Market Flexibility: Finland. Geneva: International Labour Organization. ISBN 9789221072737.
- Tokman, Victor, ed. (1991). Towards Social Adjustment: Labour Market Issues in Structural Adjustment. Geneva: International Labour Office. ISBN 9789221077459.
- In Search of Flexibility: The New Soviet Labour Market. Geneva: International Labour Office. 1991. ISBN 9789221077442.
- Fischer, Georg, ed. (1993). Structural Change in Central and Eastern Europe: Labour Market and Social Policy Implications. Paris: International Labour Organisation. ISBN 9789264139909.
- Vaughan-Whitehead, Daniel, ed. (1995). Minimum Wages in Central and Eastern Europe: From Protection to Destitution. Budapest: Central European University Press. ISBN 9781858660431.
- Sender, John; Weeks, John (1996). Restructuring the Labour Market: The South African Challenge. Cape Town: International Labour Office. ISBN 9789221095132.
- Russian Unemployment and Enterprise Restructuring: Reviving Dead Souls. Basingstoke: St. Martin's Press. 1996. ISBN 9780312161347.
- Deshpande, Sudha (1998). Labour Flexibility in a Third World Metropolis. New Delhi: Commonwealth Publishers. ISBN 978-8171694228.
- Global labour flexibility: seeking distributive justice. New York: St. Martin's Press. 1999. ISBN 978-0-333-77652-0.
- Beyond the new paternalism: basic security as equality. London New York: Verso. 2002. ISBN 978-1-85984-345-1.
- Minimum Income Schemes in Europe. Geneva: International Labour Organization. 2003. ISBN 9789221148395.
- Standing, Guy; Samson, Michael (30 September 2003). A Basic Income Grant for South Africa. Cape Town: University of Cape Town Press. ISBN 978-1-919713-86-1.
- Standing, Guy; November, Andràs (2003). Un revenu de base pour chacun(e). Genève: Bureau international du travail. ISBN 9789222151264.
- Promoting income security as a right Europe and North America. London: Anthem Press. 2005. ISBN 978-0-85728-732-8.
- Work after globalization: building occupational citizenship. Cheltenham, UK Northampton, Massachusetts: Edward Elgar. 2009. ISBN 978-1-84844-778-3.
- Standing, Guy; Jhabvala, Renana; Unni, Jeemol; Rani, Uma (2010). Social income and insecurity: a study in Gujarat. London New York: Routledge. ISBN 978-0-415-58574-3.
- The Precariat: The New Dangerous Class. London: Pelican Books. 2011. ISBN 978-1474294164.
- The Precariat. London: Bloomsbury Academic. 2011. ISBN 978-1-84966-455-4.
- A Precariat Charter: from denizens to citizens. London New York: Bloomsbury Academic. 2014. ISBN 978-1-4725-1039-6.
- Basic Income: A Transformative Policy for India (with S. Davala, R. Jhabvala and S. Kapoor Mehta. London and New Delhi: Bloomsbury Academic. 2015. ISBN 978-1-4725-8310-9.
- The Corruption of Capitalism: Why Rentiers Thrive and Work Does Not Pay. London: Biteback. 2016. ISBN 978-1-78590-044-0.
- Basic income: and how we can make it happen. London: Pelican/Penguin (A Pelican Introduction). 2017. ISBN 978-0-14-198549-7.
- Plunder of the Commons: A Manifesto for Sharing Public Wealth. London: Penguin Books Limited. 2019. ISBN 9780241396339.
- Battling Eight Giants: Basic Income Now. London: I.B. Tauris. 2020. ISBN 9780755600663.
- The Precariat: The New Dangerous Class - Special Covid-19 Edition. London: Bloomsbury Publishing (published 15 July 2021). 2021. ISBN 9780755637096.
- The Blue Commons: Rescuing the Economy of the Sea. London: Pelican Books. 2022. ISBN 978-0-24-147-58-74.
- The Politics of Time: Gaining Control in the Age of Uncertainty. London: Penguin Books Limited (published 26 October 2023). 2023. ISBN 9780241475935.
- Human Capital: The Tragedy of the Education Commons. London: Penguin Books Limited. 2026. ISBN 9780241688199.

== See also ==
- Basic income in the United Kingdom
- Decent work
- Policy Network
