= Precariat =

Class of wage-earners in a tenuous job situation close to unemployment

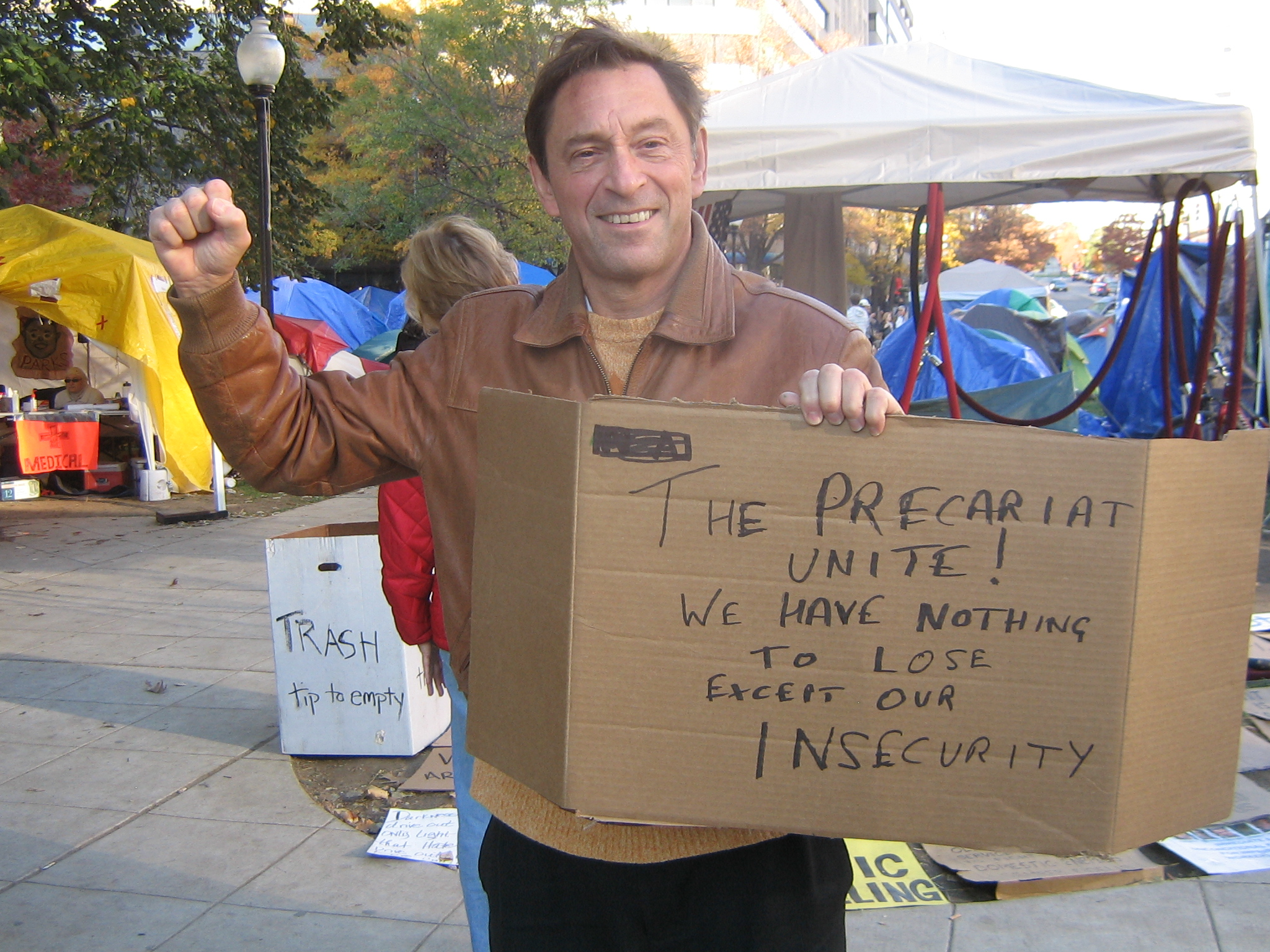
Guy Standing, who coined the term in 2011, pictured holding a sign referencing the precariat at Occupy D.C. in the same year

In sociology and economics, the precariat (/prɪˈkɛəriət/) is a social class formed by people suffering from precarity, which means existing without predictability or security, thereby affecting material or psychological well-being. The term is a portmanteau of precarious and proletariat. The theory was formulated by Guy Standing.

Unlike the proletariat of industrial workers in the 20th century, who lacked their own means of production and therefore sold their labor to survive, members of the precariat are only partially involved in labor. They must undertake extensive unremunerated activities that are essential to retaining access to jobs and decent earnings. Classic examples of such unpaid activities include continually searching and applying for work, as well as being expected to always be responsive to calls for gig work.

The theory has been criticized for defining a new class system without properly explaining it and failing to explain how the precariat is a different class from the working class, thereby obscuring more than clarifying how the class system in contemporary capitalism works.

== Overview ==
Some theorists suggest that the young precariat class in Europe has become a serious issue in the early part of the 21st century. This has been linked with major mass political developments including the Brexit referendum in the United Kingdom, and the first presidency of Donald Trump in the United States. The global COVID-19 pandemic has particularly exacerbated food insecurity in the United States. A survey conducted by the European Council on Foreign Relations discovered that only one third of Germans and one quarter of Italians and French had enough money remaining at the end of the month for discretionary spending.

The British economist Guy Standing has analysed the precariat as a new emerging social class in work done for the think tank Policy Network and the World Economic Forum. His 2011 publication titled The Precariat: The New Dangerous Class where he proposed a universal basic income as a solution for addressing the problem. In his 2014 book entitled A Precariat Charter he argued that all citizens have a right to socially inherited wealth.

The hallmark of the precariat is a lack of job security, including intermittent employment or underemployment and the resulting precarious existence. The emergence of this class has been ascribed to the entrenchment of neoliberal capitalism.

The analysis of the results of the Great British Class Survey of 2013, a collaboration between the BBC and researchers from several UK universities, contended that there is a new model of class structure consisting of seven classes, ranging from the Elite at the top to the precariat at the bottom. The Precariat class was envisaged as "the most deprived British class of all with low levels of economic, cultural and social capital." This was contrasted with "the Technical Middle Class" in Great Britain, in that instead of having disposable income but no interests, people of the new Precariat Class have all sorts of potential activities they like to engage in but cannot do any of them because they have no money, insecure lives, and are usually trapped in old industrial parts of the country.

The precariat class has been described in societies such as Japan, where it numbers over two million.

Erik Olin Wright has criticized Standing's theory for identifying seven social classes without explaining them in detail, arguing that it obscures more than it clarifies. The core of his criticism is on defining the precariat as a fully discinct class in the same sense as the working class. Wright argues that the precariat cannot be its own class in the sense of the working class as the two classes don't have different material interests and that members of the precariat do not have a unified way of securing a livelihood.

== See also ==
- Cost-of-living crisis – Situation where prices of essentials rise faster than wages
- Dead-end job – Job with little chance of advancement
- Endo contractualization – Form of exploitative temporary employment
- Lumpenproletariat – Marxist term to describe a subsection of the underclass
- McJob – Pejorative work-related slang
- Precarious work – Type of non-standard or temporary employment
- Reserve army of labour – Marxist term to describe the unemployed and undereployed in capitalist society
- Workforce casualisation – Shift from stable to often contractual labor relations
