= The Truth According to Wikipedia =

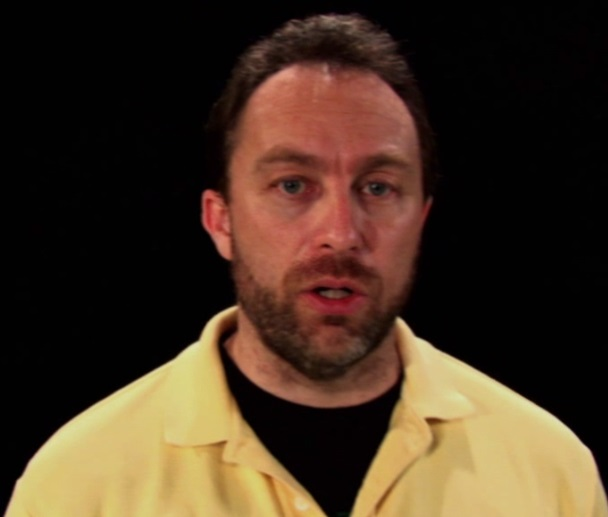
- 2007 fundraising appeal by Jimmy Wales, excerpted in the documentary
- Directed by: IJsbrand van Veelen
- Produced by: Judith van den Berg
- Starring: Jimmy Wales; Larry Sanger; Andrew Keen; Tim O'Reilly; Robert McHenry
- Cinematography: Niels van't Hoff; Pim Hawinkels; Richard Kille
- Edited by: Stefan Kamp; Jos de Putter; Doke Romeijn
- Music by: Chris Everts; Frank van der Sterre
- Distributed by: Backlight and YouTube
- Release date: 2008
- Running time: 48 minutes
- Country: Netherlands
- Language: English

The Truth According to Wikipedia, also referred to as Wiki's Truth (Dutch: Wiki's Waarheid), is a Dutch documentary about Wikipedia directed by IJsbrand van Veelen. It was screened at The Next Web conference in Amsterdam on 4 April 2008 and broadcast by the Dutch documentary series Backlight (Dutch: Tegenlicht) on Nederland 2 on 7 April 2008. It was subsequently made available through American Public Television.

The documentary examines the reliability of Wikipedia, and the dichotomy between the contributions of experts and amateur editors. The documentary includes commentary from Wikipedia co-founders Jimmy Wales and Larry Sanger, The Cult of the Amateur author Andrew Keen, O'Reilly Media chief executive officer Tim O'Reilly, and former editor-in-chief of Encyclopædia Britannica Robert McHenry. Keen says that experts should serve as guardians of information during the Web 2.0 phenomenon; this point of view is supported by analysis from Sanger.

The Truth According to Wikipedia received a generally positive reception, being described in Film Quarterly as "a sharp and wide-ranging overview of wikipistemology". The Center for Strategic and International Studies gave the documentary a rating of "Good", and called it a useful resource to teach students about appropriate sourcing. Media scholar Mirko Tobias Schäfer described it as an apt debate over truth as represented on the website. New media writer Stephen Downes said the documentary was captivating for its ability to place Wikipedia within the wider context of the Web 3.0 social phenomenon.

== Contents summary ==
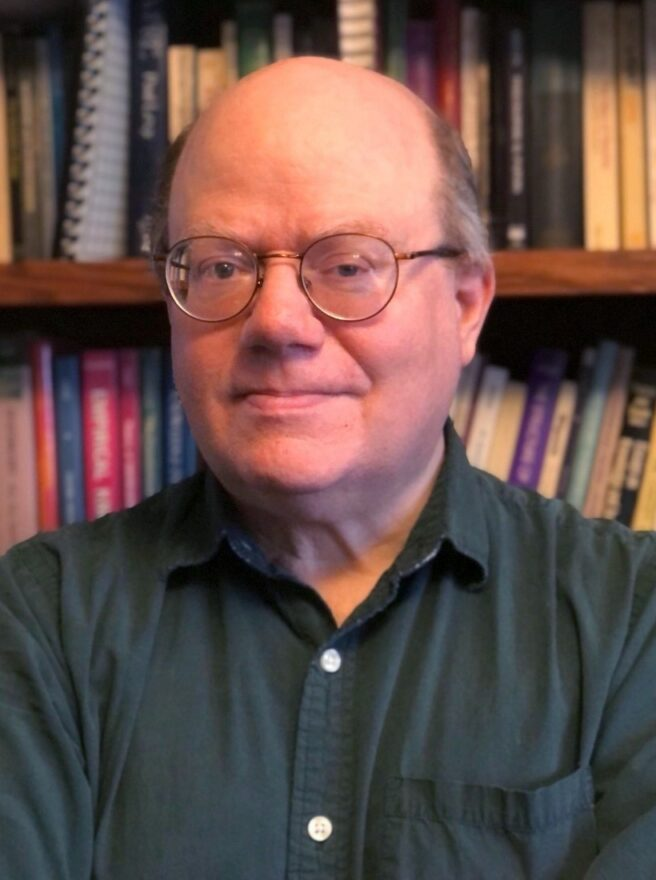
Commentary from Wikipedia co-founder Larry Sanger supports an analysis made by Andrew Keen in the documentary.

Director IJsbrand van Veelen examines questions about Wikipedia, such as whether it will harm traditional encyclopaedias, including Encyclopædia Britannica. He presents commentators who discuss the reliability of Wikipedia. Veelen also addresses the idea that information wants to be free. The documentary notes that within the period of 2006 to 2008, Wikipedia has increasingly been recognized as one of the top most popular websites, and that it often rivaled Google for those searching for information on the Internet.

Individuals who are interviewed and appear as commentators in the film include: Wikipedia co-founders Jimmy Wales and Larry Sanger; The Cult of the Amateur author Andrew Keen; How Wikipedia Works author and Wikipedia editor Phoebe Ayers; Swahili Wikipedia contributor Ndesanjo Macha; O'Reilly Media chief executive officer Tim O'Reilly; We Think author Charles Leadbeater; and former Encyclopædia Britannica editor-in-chief Robert McHenry.

Discussion topics include how the contributions of both unqualified and expert users affect Wikipedia, and more broadly, the Web 2.0 phenomenon. Charles Leadbetter puts forth the notion that the wider online community is an effective method of increasing the ideals of democracy. Leadbetter says the Web is the most effective medium for increasing individual freedoms and rights in totalitarian nations.

Andrew Keen is featured prominently in the documentary, and puts forth a thesis that veracity of information should be determined by experts who should function as guardians for such material. Keen says that without expert gatekeepers to discern what actual facts are, the danger exists that the wider community may simply invent its own perceived truths. Keen opines that in this unfortunate situation actual facts would instead be supplanted by "truthiness". (Note: "Truthiness" is a term coined by Stephen Colbert referring to perceptions about truth not supported by facts or reason.)

Keen's argument is supported in the documentary by commentary from Larry Sanger, who left Wikipedia over a conflict with Jimmy Wales regarding Sanger's desire for experts to be given additional influence on the project. Sanger acknowledges that in the early stages of Wikipedia, factual accuracy of articles was neglected in favor of a drive to increase raw content on the fledgling website.

== Production ==
The Truth According to Wikipedia was directed by IJsbrand van Veelen. He had previously directed the Backlight documentary Google: Behind the Screen. Interviews were conducted by Marijntje Denters, Martijn Kieft and IJsbrand van Veelen. William de Bruijn, Marijntje Denters, and Martijn Kieft researched and gathered information for the documentary. Judith van den Berg was the producer, and editors were Jos de Putter and Doke Romeijn. The documentary utilized 60 seconds of footage from a video made by Chris Pirillo, who later objected that such usage was done without obtaining his permission or crediting him with the content.

The documentary was released in 2008, during which time the controversy over the censorship of Wikipedia in China was ongoing. The documentary premiered globally at The Next Web conference in Amsterdam on 4 April 2008. It was broadcast by VPRO on Nederland 2 on 7 April 2008, and was made available for viewing on its YouTube channel the same year. The organization American Public Television (APT) began to make the documentary available in the summer of 2008, and was contracted to show the documentary as an APT program from February 2009 through January 2011.

== Reception ==
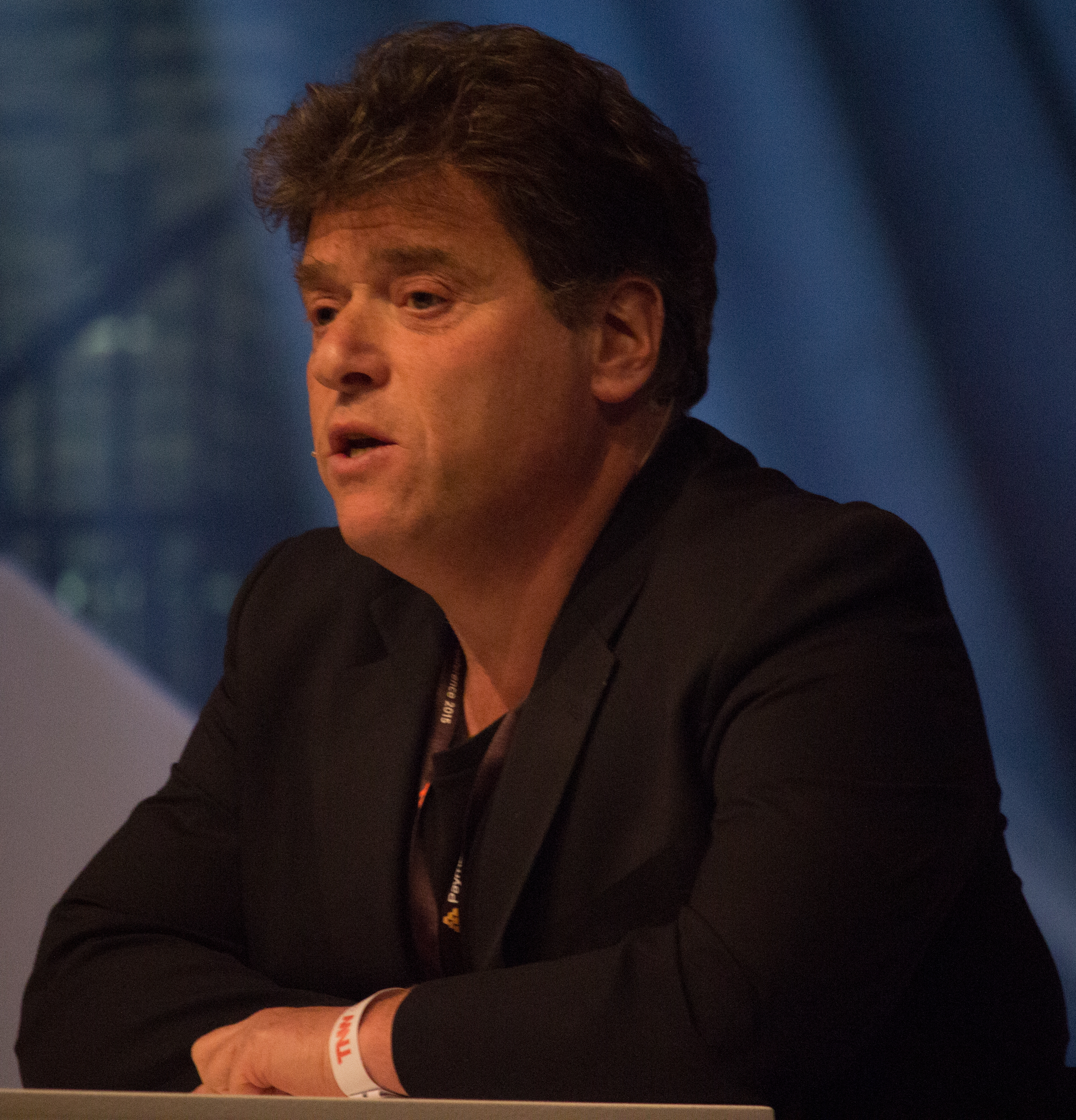
Thomas Leitch wrote in his book Wikipedia U that Andrew Keen (pictured) expressed a significant viewpoint in the documentary which merited further debate.

The Truth According to Wikipedia received a positive review in the journal Film Quarterly, where author Ben Walters‌ called the documentary, "a sharp and wide-ranging overview of wikipistemology". In a report entitled Teaching Seven Revolutions: A Tool Kit for Educating Globally Competent Citizens published by the Center for Strategic and International Studies, the documentary was given a rating of: "Good – especially if students think Wikipedia is the one source for everything". It was recommended as a resource to learn about information science.

Author Thomas Leitch in his book Wikipedia U wrote that Keen's perspective on Wikipedia in particular and Web 2.0 in general as expressed in the documentary was a significant viewpoint. Leitch said the criticism directed at Wikipedia by Keen merited further debate because it reflected assumptions explaining why Wikipedia was met with wariness by educators that discouraged the encyclopedia's use in a classroom setting. Bastard Culture! author Mirko Tobias Schäfer called the documentary a well-received analysis of the discussion over truth on Wikipedia.

The Truth According to Wikipedia was given positive reception by Eric Schonfeld of TechCrunch, who commented that the film was expertly created. Though he praised the documentary for displaying multiple different viewpoints, he was critical of the documentary's emphasis on Andrew Keen throughout, and said it became a tool for Keen to publicize his polemics against Wikipedia. Schonfeld assessed that Keen came away as the winner of his thesis by the end of the documentary. Of Keen's argument, Schonfeld pointed out that he did not address how researchers on Wikipedia could either be experts themselves, or subsequently become experts by virtue of improving the quality of articles on the website.

Commenting on the documentary himself, Keen called it an enlightening documentary. Media futurist, blogger, and writer Gerd Leonhard recommended the documentary and called it most entertaining. Nicholas Carlson of Gawker Media framed the documentary as a conflict of "Experts vs. amateurs", and distilled the essence of the documentary down to a 90-second version.

Designer and commentator in the fields of online learning and new media Stephen Downes characterized The Truth According to Wikipedia as a fascinating documentary both about its website of focus and the larger phenomenon of Web 2.0. Downes was critical of the film's use of a documentary-style format in order to present its message, and argued that the viewpoints presented were not subsequently backed up by documentation.

Ernst-Jan Pfauth of The Next Web praised the documentary's director for gathering together a varied group of experts to comment upon Wikipedia for the documentary. He posed questions raised by the documentary's analysis, and wondered whether the Web had succeeded in increasing intelligence and accuracy within society. Pfauth asked: "Are equality and truth really reconcilable ideals?"

== See also ==
- Bibliography of Wikipedia
- List of films about Wikipedia
- Truth in Numbers?
- The Virtual Revolution
