= List of films about Wikipedia =

The following is a list of films about Wikipedia.

== Films ==
- The Truth According to Wikipedia (also referred to as Wiki's Warhead and Wiki's Truth) is a 2008 Dutch documentary film about Wikipedia directed by IJsbrand van Veelen which was originally shown on Backlight. The documentary examines the reliability of Wikipedia, and the dichotomy between usage of experts versus amateur editors. The film includes commentary from Wikipedia co-founders Jimmy Wales and Larry Sanger, The Cult of the Amateur author Andrew Keen, O'Reilly Media chief executive officer Tim O'Reilly, and former editor-in-chief of Encyclopædia Britannica Robert McHenry. Keen argues that experts should serve as guardians of information during the Web 2.0 phenomenon; this point of view is supported by analysis from Sanger. The film was released both as a Dutch-language and an English-language edition (with subtitles for interviews in other languages).
- Truth in Numbers? is a 2010 American documentary film which explores the history and cultural implications of the online user-editable encyclopedia Wikipedia. The film attempts to answer the question of whether any individual or only experts should be tasked with editing an encyclopedia. A history and background of the website is given, as well as commentary from Wikipedia founders Jimmy Wales and Larry Sanger. Commentators that appear in the film include author Howard Zinn, Len Downie of The Washington Post, Bob Schieffer of CBS News, former Encyclopædia Britannica chief Robert McHenry, and former Central Intelligence Agency director James Woolsey. The documentary discusses incidents which shed a negative light on Wikipedia, including the Essjay controversy and the Wikipedia biography controversy.
- People are Knowledge
  People are Knowledge is a film made during the course of a research project that explored how alternate methods of citation could be employed on Wikipedia. The film documents a series of specific situations with regard to published knowledge, and, subsequently, with oral citations. It was made by Priya Sen, Zen Marie and Achal Prabhala.
- Wikipedia and the Democratization of Knowledge is a 2021 German documentary film by the directors Lorenza Castella and Jascha Hannover. The film reviews the twenty-year history of Wikipedia. Thoughts on the project are shared from the founders Jimmy Wales and Larry Sanger, authors from Germany, France, Ghana, South Africa, the United States and other countries. A South African Wikipedian explains their experience with the Xitsonga language Wikipedia.
- Wikipedia – Die Schwarmoffensive is a 2021 German documentary film by María Teresa Curzio. It was published September 2021 on the television channel 3sat.
- Wikipedia: The Documentary, a 2022 film directed by Patrick Ray Gallows.

== See also ==
- Bibliography of Wikipedia
