= Aaron Curry =

Aaron Curry may refer to:

- Aaron Curry (American football) (born 1986), American football linebacker
- Aaron Curry (politician) (1887–1957), British MP
- Aaron Curry (artist), winner of the Berlin Prize
- ORFN (Aaron Curry, 1974–2016), graffiti artist active in the San Francisco Bay Area
- Aaron Curry (producer) from Fight Club (novel)
