= Lockerbie Revisited =

- Backlight episode
- Directed by: Gideon Levy
- Cinematography by: Gregor Meerman
- Editing by: Jos de Putter
- Original air date: 27 April 2009
- Running time: 52 minutes

"Lockerbie Revisited" is a 52-minute episode of the Dutch VPRO documentary television series Backlight (Dutch: Tegenlicht) which was broadcast in the Netherlands on the eve of Abdelbaset al-Megrahi's second appeal against his conviction of multiple counts of murder for his connection to the bombing of Pan Am Flight 103 that started at the High Court of Justiciary in Edinburgh on 28 April 2009. The film's director, Gideon Levy, narrates in Dutch and conducts interviews in English with retired FBI officer Richard Marquise, Detective Chief Superintendent Stuart Henderson of the Scottish police, ex-FBI laboratory official Thomas Thurman, UN Observer at the Lockerbie trial Hans Köchler, author and journalist Ian Ferguson, former CIA agent Robert Baer, ex-FBI laboratory scientist Fred Whitehurst and former Lord Advocate Lord Fraser of Carmyllie.

In October 2009, Backlight – Lockerbie Revisited was awarded the Prix Europa as the Best Television Current Affairs Programme of the Year 2009. The prize was donated by the Directorate of Communication of the Council of Europe. The documentary has been nominated for a Rockie award in the 'Investigative & Current Affairs' category at the 2010 Banff World Television Festival.

== Summary ==
Robert Baer says that geopolitics and inter-agency rivalry prevented the CIA passing intelligence-derived evidence to the FBI following the bombing of Pan Am Flight 103. Richard Marquise states categorically that no money was paid to any of the witnesses before the trial. In relation to witness Tony Gauci, Marquise refuses to say whether any money was paid out after the trial. Lord Fraser says he gave strict instructions that no payment should be made to witnesses. Dr Whitehurst describes the FBI laboratory as a "crime scene", where his unqualified colleague Tom Thurman would routinely alter Whitehurst's scientific reports over a five-year period. Ian Ferguson reports that the timer fragment – allegedly found in the PA103 debris and which allegedly was part of the Mebo timer that triggered the bomb – had not been tested for explosives residue for 'budgetary reasons'. Whitehurst does not accept that cost could be the reason since it would have taken him just a morning's work to have tested the timer fragment. Thurman confirms that the fragment – the only real piece of evidence against Libya – had been brought over from the UK to the FBI lab, where he had personally identified it as coming from the circuit board of a Mebo MST-13 timer, only 20 of which had been made and all were supplied to Libya. Marquise agrees that "without the timer fragment we would have been unable to develop additional evidence against Libya." He says that of all the evidence retrieved from the crash scene, only one piece – the timer fragment – was brought to America. Lord Fraser disagrees saying he would have had to authorise the handing over to the FBI of this crucial piece of evidence, and he had not done so.

In another interview towards the end of the film, Marquise changes his mind and is prompted by DCS Henderson to say that the "fragment never came to the US." Marquise volunteers that he actually saw the timer fragment (PT-35) in London, but Henderson corrects him saying Marquise had seen it where all the other evidence was kept in the UK. Before taking his leave, Henderson emphasises to the camera that there are "no hidden holes to find because the culprit is in custody – take my word for it!"

Ian Ferguson is given the last word. He is heard to say: "This could bring an end to the appeal. If the Crown knew that this was all going to be heard in public, they may well drop their opposition to the appeal and Megrahi goes free. That's how fucking important it is. This could bring the Scottish judicial system and the FBI into fucking complete disrepute, and frankly they would not want this linen to be washed in public!"

== Marquise response ==
The FBI's Richard Marquise responded to this summary of the film 'Lockerbie Revisited' as follows: "I would like to clarify one point which so many people seem to have made important. A photograph of PT-35 was identified by Tom Thurman as similar to a photograph of a timer circuit board which had been located in Senegal in 1988 in the possession of two Libyan intelligence officers. He also compared that photograph with the circuit board of a similar MEBO timer found in Togo in 1986 and in the possession of the US in 1990. He believed them to be identical. The FBI asked the Scottish police to bring the fragment (PT-35) to the US in about June 1990 to be compared with the photograph of the Senegal timer and the circuit board of the Togo timer. Feraday did in fact bring the fragment to the US--it was never out of his possession and was brought back to the UK at the conclusion of his analysis with Tom Thurman in the FBI lab. This is what I said on my initial interview and later clarified my remarks made at Arlington in December by email to Mr Levy in December 2008 stating I believed that Feraday did in fact bring the fragment to the US but it was never out of his possession. I did not see the fragment on that trip. I later saw the fragment (PT-35) in person at RARDE when I traveled there with Mr. Henderson in the winter of 1991. I have many more things I would like to say but do not want to use this site to post my "rants" each time I disagree with what someone posts."

== Related interviews ==
On the VPRO website there are links to June 2005 interviews by Gideon Levy featuring Dr Jim Swire and Professor Robert Black.
