= Democratization of knowledge =

Term for the spread of knowledge to non-elites

The democratization of knowledge is the acquisition and spread of knowledge amongst a wider part of the population, not just elite groups such as clergy, professionals, or academia as in the past. This phenomenon is largely unique to the Information Age. Mass literacy, the printing press, public libraries, television, and modern information technology such as the Internet have played key roles, as they provide the masses with open access to information through a variety of means.

== History ==
Literate and illiterate world population over time

The Information Age is a historical period that began in the mid-20th century. It is characterized by a rapid shift from traditional industries, as established during the Industrial Revolution, to an economy centered on information technology.

Digitization efforts by Google Books have been pointed to as an example of the democratization of knowledge, but Malte Herwig in Der Spiegel raised concerns that the virtual monopoly Google has in the search market, combined with Google's hiding of the details of its search algorithms, could undermine this move towards democratization.

Google Scholar (and similar scholarly search services) and Sci-Hub (and similar scholarly shadow libraries) have also been pointed to as examples of democratization of knowledge.

Open Library's and HathiTrust's digitization efforts and their use of the controlled digital lending model are also examples of democratization of knowledge.

== Role of libraries ==
An article written in 2005 by the editors of Reference & User Services Quarterly calls the library the greatest force for the democratization of knowledge or information. It continues to say that public libraries in particular are inextricably linked with the history and evolution of the United States, but school library media centers, college and university libraries, and special libraries have all also been influential in their support for democracy. Libraries play an essential role in the democratization of knowledge and information by providing communities with the resources and tools to find information free of charge. Democratic access to knowledge has also been co-opted to mean providing information in a variety of formats, which essentially means electronic and digital formats for use by library patrons. Public libraries help further the democratization of information by guaranteeing freedom of access to information, by providing an unbiased variety of information sources and access to government services, as well as the promotion of democracy and active citizenship.

Dan Cohen, the founding executive director of the Digital Public Library of America, writes that democratic access to knowledge is a profound idea that requires constant tending and revitalization. In 2004, a World Social Forum and International workshop was held entitled "Democratization of Information: Focus on Libraries". The focus of the forum was to bring awareness to the social, technological, and financial challenges facing libraries dealing with the democratization of information. Social challenges included globalization and the digital divide, technological challenges included information sources, and financial challenges constituted shrinking budgets and manpower. Longtime Free Library of Philadelphia director Elliot Shelkrot said that "Democracy depends on an informed population. And where can people get all the information they need? —At the Library."

== See also ==
- Autodidacticism
- Citizen science
- Democratization
- Encyclopédie
- Ideagoras
- Intellectual property
- Trade secret
- Wikipedia and the Democratization of Knowledge, a 2021 German documentary
