= Backlight (disambiguation) =

Backlight is a form of illumination used in liquid crystal displays (LCDs).

Backlight may also refer to:

- Backlight (film), a 2010 Portuguese-American mystery film
- Backlight (TV program), a 2007 Dutch documentary television program
- Backlighting (lighting design), the process of illuminating a subject from the back

== See also ==
- Display motion blur, which involves the use of strobed backlights to minimize the effect
