= Dataveillance =

Monitoring and collecting online data and metadata

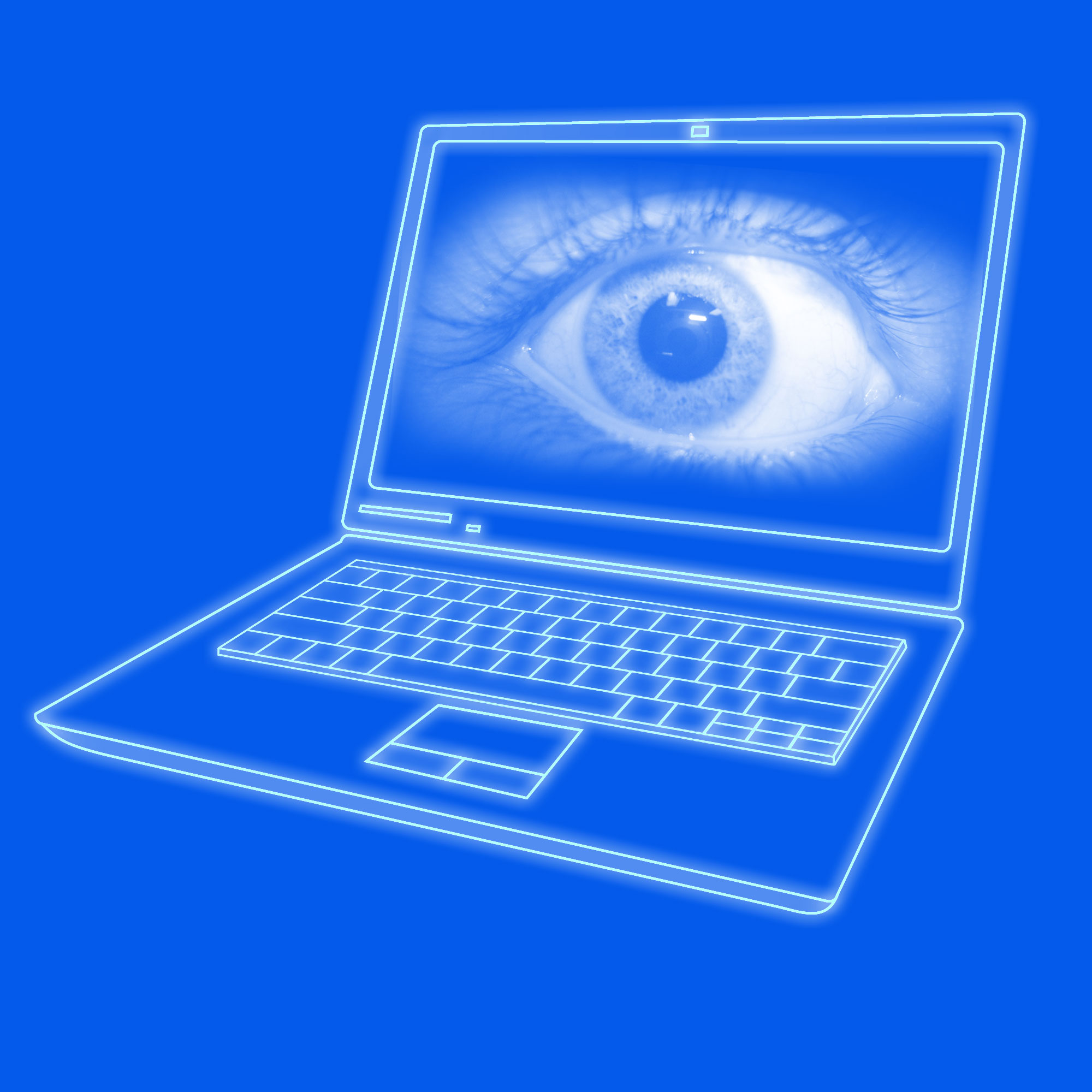

Dataveillance is the practice of monitoring and collecting online data as well as metadata. The word is a portmanteau of data and surveillance. Dataveillance is concerned with the continuous monitoring of users' communications and actions across various platforms. For instance, dataveillance refers to the monitoring of data resulting from credit card transactions, GPS coordinates, emails, social networks, etc. Using digital media often leaves traces of data and creates a digital footprint of our activity. Unlike sousveillance, this type of surveillance is not often known and happens discreetly. Dataveillance may involve the surveillance of groups of individuals. There exist three types of dataveillance: personal dataveillance, mass dataveillance, and facilitative mechanisms.

Unlike computer and network surveillance, which collects data from computer networks and hard drives, dataveillance monitors and collects data (and metadata) through social networks and various other online platforms. Dataveillance is not to be confused with electronic surveillance. Electronic surveillance refers to the surveillance of oral and audio systems such as wire tapping. Additionally, electronic surveillance depends on having suspects already presumed before surveillance can occur. On the other hand, dataveillance can use data to identify an individual or a group. Oftentimes, these individuals and groups have sparked some form of suspicion with their activity.

Dataveillance has significant impacts on advertising theory and practice. These impacts particularly stem from recent infrastructure and technological advancements that increase the extent to which advertisers can gain data information about consumers and their behaviours. For example, collecting data can be extended into collecting consumers’ offline behaviors and to places that are considered private.

== Types ==
The types of dataveillance are separated by the way data is collected, as well as the number of individuals associated with it.

Personal Dataveillance: Personal dataveillance refers to the collection and monitoring of a person's personal data. Personal dataveillance can occur when an individual's data causes a suspicion or has attracted attention in some way. Personal data can include information such as birth date, address, social security (or social insurance) number, as well as other unique identifiers.

Mass Dataveillance: Refers to the collection of data on groups of people. The general distinction between mass dataveillance and personal dataveillance is the surveillance and collection of data as a group rather than an individual.

Facilitative Mechanisms: Unlike mass dataveillance a group is not targeted. An individual's data is placed into a system or database along with various others where computer matching can unveil distinct patterns. An individual's data is never considered to part of a group in this instance.

== Benefits and concerns ==
=== Pros ===
There are many concerns and benefits associated with dataveillance. Dataveillance can be useful for collecting and verifying data in ways that are beneficial. For instance, personal dataveillance can be utilized by financial institutions to track fraudulent purchases on credit card accounts. This has the potential to prevent and regulate fraudulent financial claims and resolve the issue.

Compared to traditional methods of surveillance, dataveillance tends to be an economical approach, since it can monitor more information in a less time. In this case, the responsibility of monitoring is transferred to computers, therefore reducing time and human labor in the process of surveilling.

Dataveillance has also been useful in assessing security threats associated with terrorism. Authorities have utilized dataveillance to help them understand and predict potential terrorist or criminal threats. Dataveillance is very important to the concept of predictive policing. Since predictive policing requires a great deal of data to operate effectively and dataveillance can do just that. Predictive policing allows police to intervene in potential crimes to create safer communities and better understand potential threats.

Businesses also rely on dataveillance to help them understand the online activity for potential clients by tracking their online activity. By tracking their online activity through cookies, as well as various other methods, businesses are able to better understand what sort of advertisements work with their existing and potential clients. While making online transactions users often give away their information freely which is later used by the company for corporate or private interests. For businesses this information can help boost sales and attract attention towards their products to help generate revenue.

=== Cons ===
On the other hand, there are many concerns that arise with dataveillance. Dataveillance assumes that our technologies and data are a true reflection of ourselves. This presents itself as a potential concern. This becomes a critical concern when associated with the surveillance of criminal suspects and terrorist groups. Authorities who monitor these suspects would then assume that the data they have collected reflects their actions. This helps to understand potential or past threats for criminals as well.

There is also the lack of transparency and privacy regarding companies who collect and share their user's data. This is a critical issue with both the trust and belief of the data and its uses. Many social networks have argued that their users forfeit part of their privacy in order to provide their service for free. Several of these companies choose not to fully disclose what data is collected and who it is shared with. When data is volunteered to companies it is difficult to know what companies have gained data about you and your online activity. Much of an individual's data is shared with websites and social networks in order to provide a more customized marketing experience. Many of those social networks may share your information with intelligence agencies and authorities, without a user's knowledge. Since the recent scandal involving Edward Snowden and National Security Agency, it has been revealed that authorities may have access to more data from various devices and platforms. It has become very difficult to know what will happen with your data or what specifically has been collected. It is also important to recognize that while online users are worried about their information, many of those same worries are not always applied to their activities or behavior. With social networks collecting a large amount of personal data such as birth date, legal name, sex, and photos there is an issue of dataveillance compromising confidentiality. Ultimately, dataveillance can compromise online anonymity.

Despite dataveillance compromising anonymity, anonymity itself presents a crucial issue. Online criminals who steal users' data and information may exploit it for their own gain. Tactics used by online users to conceal their identity, make it difficult for others to track the criminal behavior and identify those responsible. Having unique identifiers such as IP addresses allows for the identification of users actions, which are often used to track illegal online activity such as piracy.

While dataveillance may help businesses market their products to existing and potential clients, there are concerns over how and who has access to customer data. When visiting a business's website, cookies are often installed onto users' devices. Cookies have been a new way for businesses to obtain data on potential customers, since it allows them to track their online activities. Companies may also look to sell information they have collected on their clients to third parties. Since clients are not notified about these transactions it becomes difficult to know where your data has been sold. Furthermore, since dataveillance is discrete, clients are very unlikely to know the exact nature of the data that has been either collected or sold. Education on tracking tools (such as cookies) presents a critical issue. If businesses or online services are unwilling to define cookies, or educate their users as to why they are being used, many may unwillingly accept them.

The issue stemming from companies and other agencies which collect personal data and information is that they have now engaged in the practices of data brokering. Data brokers, such as Acxiom, collect users' information, and are known for often selling that information to third parties. While companies may disclose that they are collecting data or online activity from their users, it is usually not comprehensible by everyday users. It is difficult for everyday people to spot this disclosure, since it is hidden by jargon and writing most often understood by lawyers. This is now becoming a new source of revenue for companies.

In terms of predictive policing, the proper use of crime data and the combination of offline practices and technology have also become the challenges for police institutions. Too much reliance on results brought up by big data may lead to the subjective judgement of police. It also may reduce the amount of real-time on site communication between local police officers and residents in particular areas, thus decreasing the opportunity for the police to investigate and cruise in local communities at a frequent basis. Secondly, data security still remains to be a huge dilemma, considering the access to crime data and the potential use of these data for negative purposes. Last but not least, discrimination towards certain community might be developed due to the findings of data analysis, which could lead to improper behaviours or over-reaction of surveillance.

One of the major issues with dataveillance is the removal of a human actors from the loop. Computer systems which oversee data and construct representations. This can allow for greater risk of false representations being created, as they are based on the data that has been surveilled. Computer systems can only use the data they have, wand if this is not an accurate depiction of individuals or their situations then false representations can be created. Dataveillance is highly automated through computer systems which observe our interactions and activities. Highly automated systems and technology eliminates human understanding of our activities.

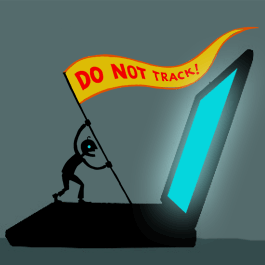

== Resistance ==
With such an increase in data collection and surveillance, many individuals are now attempting to reduce the concerns which have risen alongside it. Countersurveillance is perhaps the most significant concept focused on the tactics to prevent dataveillance. There are various tools associated with the concept of countersurveillance, which disrupt the effectiveness and possibilities of dataveillance.

Privacy-enhancing technologies, otherwise known as PETs, have been utilized by individuals to reduce data collection and decrease the possibility for dataveillance. PETs, such as adblocker, attempt to prevent other actors from collecting users data. In the case of adblock, the web browser extension is able to prevent the display of advertisements, which disrupts data collection about users online interactions. For businesses that may limit their opportunity to provide online users with tailored advertisements.

Recently, the European Union demanded companies to indicate that their website uses cookies. This law has become basic practice by many online services and companies, however, education on tracking tools with the general public differs and therefore can prevent the effectiveness of this sort of ruling. However, many companies are launching new PETs initiatives within their products. For example, Mozilla's Firefox Focus in pre-enabled with customizable privacy features, which allows for better online privacy. A few of the tools featured in Firefox Focus are also mimicked by other web browsers such as Apple's Safari. Some of the various tools featured with these web browsers are the capabilities to block ads and remove cookie data and history. Private browsing, otherwise known as Incognito for Google Chrome users, allows users to browse the web with having their history or cookies saved. These tools, aid in curbing dataveillance, by disrupting the collection and analysis of users' data. While several other web browsers may not pre-enable these PETs within their software users can download the same tools, like adblocker, through their browser's web store such as the Google Chrome Web Store. Many of these extensions help enable better privacy tools.

Social networks, such as Facebook, have introduced new security measures to help users protect their online data. Users can block their posts and other information on their account other than their name and profile picture. While this doesn't necessarily prevent data tracking these tools have helped to keep users data more private and less accessible for online criminals to exploit.

== See also ==
- Big data
- Critical data studies
- Global surveillance disclosures (2013–present)
- Mass surveillance
- Surveillance capitalism
- Dataism
- Internet privacy
