= Wikipedia and the Democratization of Knowledge =

2021 documentary about Wikipedia

- German: Das Wikipedia Versprechen – 20 Jahre Wissen für alle?
- Directed by: Lorenza Castella; Jascha Hannover
- Produced by: Andre Schäfer
- Starring: Katherine Maher; Jimmy Wales; Simon Winchester; Andrew Keen; Felix Nartey; Ivonne González Nuñez; Sverker Johansson; May Hachem; Achim Raschka; Dumisani Ndubane; Larry Sanger; Emna Mizouni; Martin Cohen; Marvin Oppong; Theresa Hannig; Aaron Halfaker; Jules
- Music by: Martin Gerke
- Release date: 5 January 2021
- Country: Germany
- Language: German

Wikipedia and the Democratization of Knowledge (German: Das Wikipedia Versprechen – 20 Jahre Wissen für alle?) is a German documentary film by the directors Lorenza Castella and Jascha Hannover. Released on January 5, 2021, for the WDR in cooperation with Arte.

== Synopsis ==
The film reviews the twenty-year history of Wikipedia, including its development from forerunner Nupedia to the start of the project in 2001 and up to 2020, at which point Wikipedia has developed into by far the largest encyclopedia of all time with over 50 million articles in many languages. It includes interviews with Wikipedia founders Jimmy Wales and Larry Sanger, as well as contributors from Germany, France, Ghana, South Africa, the United States and other countries.

In addition to Wikipedia's successes, the film discusses several weaknesses of the project including the influence exerted by politicians, states and companies, and the limited representation of women's biographies and topics from Africa and Asia.

Towards the end of the film, a South African Wikipedian with the native language Xitsonga is introduced, who was disappointed that there were only about eighty articles in the Xitsonga language Wikipedia when he first started. He could not easily expand and edit them because Wikipedia requires written, verifiable sources. In his culture, oral transmission of stories is a primary method of passing down knowledge over generations. The verifiable information recorded in writing was mainly recorded by "colonialist, white Europeans." In some cases, these accounts differed significantly from the views and information concerning the ethnic group. Not all information of humankind is passed on as verifiable information recorded in writing, but much also in the form of oral transmission. Therefore, Wikipedia's quality criteria cannot fully address sources describing this culture. Questioning whether Wikipedia's conception of verifiability requiring written records is neutral or reflects a Eurocentric bias, the film discusses whether a revision of these standards is necessary.

== Production and distribution ==
The film was a production by Florianfilm GmbH on behalf of WDR and in cooperation with Arte.

The first broadcast on German free TV took place on 5 January 2021 at 11:50 p.m. on Arte. The film was released two days earlier in Arte's online media library and was uploaded to YouTube on 4 January. An English subtitled version was made available on the website on 15 January 2021, and on the same day an English-language dubbed version was posted to YouTube. Four other subtitled versions were released on the website: in French with the title Il était une fois Wikipédia since 3 January (uploaded with dubbing on 4 January on YouTube), in Polish with the title Wikipedia - demokratyczna utopia czy stracona szansa? since 14 January, in Spanish with the title La promesa de Wikipedia since 15 January, and in Italian with the title Wikipedia: la conoscenza è per tutti? also since 15 January. All of these releases were made available for a limited time until 4 April 2021.

== Reception ==
In a review for Deutschlandfunk Kultur, Matthias Dell described the film as a good overview of the history of the project, trying to "weigh up and objectify" a lot. Otherwise, the film is only vague and works "like an average Wikipedia entry" according to Dell. For him, the discussion about standards of knowledge production is the strongest point of the film – for instance, how Western standards of knowledge production should apply to parts of the world that are non-Western-influenced and have a stronger oral tradition of knowledge transfer. However, regarding questions like how objective knowledge can be, what the standards for relevance are in a global perspective or what role Wikipedia could play in the media platform economy, to Dell the film "is not a unique contribution". The general enthusiastic tone left Dell with the impression that it was a "promotional film" for Wikipedia.

In a review for the daily newspaper Neues Deutschland, Bahareh Ebrahimi wrote that the documentary shows the "contradictions of a once utopian project". According to Ebrahimi, "the once radical lexicon, which actually wanted nothing to do with traditional science, is very similar to traditional – western – science 20 years after its foundation". The film shows that "Wikipedia authors now call themselves New World historians", but have "almost the same problem as the old historians", namely wanting to work globally "without being able to think globally".

== See also ==
- Bibliography of Wikipedia
- List of films about Wikipedia
