= Gideon Levy (Dutch journalist) =

Amsterdam-based independent filmmaker and producer

- Born: 1969 (age 56–57)
- Education: University of Amsterdam
- Occupations: Journalist and TV-presenter

Gideon Levy (born 1969) is an Amsterdam-based independent filmmaker and producer. He is a host for current affairs programs for Dutch Public Television. Levy's films have been sold internationally and his films have been screened at festivals worldwide. His work frequently examines political and cultural power structures evaluating the place of the individual within those structures. Levy's investigative film Lockerbie Revisited won the 2009 Prix Europa competition in Berlin.

== Academic ==
Levy studied at the University of Amsterdam where he obtained degrees in Social Geography (BA) and International Relations/Political Science (MA).

== Filmmaker / Television Host ==
Levy began his professional career working for the Dutch Public network VPRO where he produced TV series and documentaries. He was the co-host of the weekly current affairs program Levy & Sadeghi with Bahram Sadeghi. Together they created The Lobbyists, a series exploring politics and society in the United States during the run-up to the Bush/Kerry presidential election in 2004. He was also the creator and host of LEVY a current affairs program for the AVRO broadcaster.

Levy's investigative documentary film Lockerbie Revisited about the notorious bombing of Flight 103 over Scotland won the Prix Europa in Berlin in 2009 and was the ‘Gold World Winner’ at the New York Festival in 2011. The film was also nominated at Canada's Banff World Media Festival in 2010 for the prestigious ‘Rockie Award for Investigative Journalism & Current Affairs’. The film was screened before the Scottish Parliament.

His documentary series Israel, Between Dream and Reality featured prominent commentary by writer David Grossman and his Israeli namesake journalist Gideon Levy, among other notables. In 2013 another of his documentary series Levy and the Last Nazis led to the prosecution of Dutch SS volunteer Siert Bruins in Hagen, Germany.

Levy's documentary film Goodbye Amerika (2020) about U.S. government climate scientists working under then-President Trump's climate change denying administration played a key role in the establishment the Greenhouse Gas Monitor. The NGO, a collaboration of scientists from NASA, the VU University in Amsterdam, TNO and a group of creatives, is developing affordable networks to monitor greenhouse gas emissions.

== Producer ==
In 1999, Gideon Levy Productions began operations in Amsterdam. Its first fiction project was the short film Lot by director Tamar van den Dop. The film was the Dutch nominee for the Academy Awards in 2002 and won both the ‘Public‘ and ‘Special Jury’ prizes at Festival Premiers Plans d'Angers/France.

In 2016 Gideon produced the documentary Unknown Brood by director Dennis Alink, which opened at the IDFA Festival in the Royal Carré Theatre and was the Dutch nominee in the festival's Music competition .

The company also produced the documentary film Defending Brother No2 by Jorien van Nes, which was nominated for a Golden Calf for 'Best Feature Documentary' at the Dutch Film Festival, in 2017. The film, shot over a period over many years, followed the criminal defense team of lawyers defending Nuon Chea, accused of war crimes and atrocities while he was the second-in-command of the Khmer Rouge in Cambodia.
