= Piece by Piece (2005 film) =

- Directed by: Nic Hill
- Produced by: Nic Hill
- Narrated by: Senor One
- Edited by: Nic Hill; John Murillo
- Production company: Underdog Pictures
- Release date: 2005
- Running time: 79 minutes
- Country: United States
- Language: English

Piece by Piece is a 2005 American documentary film directed by Nic Hill. The film documents San Francisco's graffiti culture from the early 1980s to 2004. It is narrated by the San Francisco graffiti artist Senor One, better known as Renos.

The San Francisco Bay Guardian's Cheryl Eddy singled the film out as the highlight of the 2006 Hi/Lo film festival, calling it "an educational experience" and "a thoughtful document". In a full review for that same paper, Johnny Ray Huston said it was "a thorough history that still makes time ... for abstract, lyrical flowing passages". Huston complained that sections such as those featuring Tie One or Reminisce could make movies in themselves, and wished to see more detailing of artists' entries into the legitimate art world. He concluded that the film and director "succeeded at a mighty task" and were interested in displaying "a deep but entertaining understanding of the city as both a historical site and a nexus for contemporary change". Rory L. Aronsky of Film Threat wrote that the documentary "gets this graffiti culture completely right", while for Dennis Harvey of Variety, it was "an excellent overview of two decades' graffiti in San Francisco".

== Synopsis ==
=== Chapter 1 ===
The first segment of Piece by Piece lays out the fundamentals of San Francisco graffiti by documenting topics that laid the groundwork for artists today. Items covered are “Cholo” writing, the impact of PBS's Style Wars (1983), and the development of San Francisco's defined style. This segment includes not only San Francisco's graffiti originals, but also commentary from noted New York City writers such as Seen, Cope2 and Case2. It also covers the life and death of Dream One, a San Francisco graffiti pioneer and a vocal figurehead in Bay Area urban welfare activism.

=== Chapter 2 ===
The second segment elaborates on what it takes to establish credibility among the graffiti community, documents a shift from words to images, and tetcreats of how San Francisco developed graffiti styles yet to be seen in other parts of the world. This segment features works from writers such as KR and the horses of Reminisce, following writers and documenting their creative expression. Also featured here are Grey, Buter, Joro, Norm and Barry McGee (Twist).

=== Chapter 3 ===
The final segment of Piece by Piece explores the wide range of public opinion towards graffiti by giving voice to citizens of San Francisco and to representatives of law enforcement on the subject. It also details the artists’ confessions of their love and addiction to graffiti art and typographic lettering, instances of their social activism, and the short life span of their work.

== Featured artists and crews ==
Dug, Cycle, Grey, Seen, Dream, Tie One, KR, Revok, Twist, Renos, Crayone, Diet, Ub-40, Reminisce, Deen, Buter, Giant, Jorone, Vegan, Kode/Kodigo/Koder, Norm, Reyes, Abhor, Awe, Bisie, Bles, Bzaro, Case2, Charo, Chief, Cope2, Cuba, Cyme, Cypher, Darks, Dj Rise, Emuse, Erupto, Five0, Flack, Fury, Igni, Jase, Maseo, Mque, Nate, Kid, Neon, Omen, ORFN, Phine, Phresh, Piccaso, Poesia, Quake, Raeyvn, Revers, Rolex, Saber, Saytr, Sibl, Skew, Skrag, Spie, Sprays, Trem, Twick, UFO, Vogue, 1Werd, TMF, TDK, TWS, ICP, AS, THR, HTK, BMB, FSC, MSK, AWR, AOK, LORDS, BA, US, GTB, KUK, OSD, BST et al.

== Soundtrack ==
- "War Night" – A.A. Kertz
- "Untitled," "Untitled" – TD Camp
- "Razorblade Alcohol Slide," "Invasion of the Octopus People," "Cosmic Assassins" – DJ Qbert
- "Shin" – Lusine ICL
- "Lil J Says Wus Up" – produced by Equipto
- "San Francisco Knights," "Slow Bullet" – People Under the Stairs
- "Taste Your Own Medicine," "Population Birth Control" – Distopia
- "Fifteen" – Stab1, written/produced by Jason Foote
- "DWA" – Topr Holiday, written/produced by Dick Nasty & Bootleg
- "White Film" – Tujiko Noriko
- "West Side," "Misbehaving," "SlooShea" – written/produced by Chris Fox
- "Move to the Left" – produced by Board Stiff
- "Roko" – written/produced by Crayone
- TMF section: "Untitled" – artist unknown
- "Cleanrok" – produced by Rundown (opusfreqlabs.com)
- "H.T.'s Mist," "Interrupted Silence" – produced by Josh Hertel
- "Are You With Me," "That's How It Was" – produced by Ink One for Bhrn Poppie Music
- "SF Mafia" – Angelo Shadik
- "Random Thought" – Kool DJ Rize
- "Evacuate" – Baligerance
- "Lit Up and Protruding" – Electric Company
- "Off the Block" – R Clothing & Music
- "You Just Don't Understand" – produced by Kid 606
- "Silly," "Havana," "Take Over" – produced by Archetect
- "Catharsis" – All Bets Off
- "Bad Bender" – B-Student
- "A.C.P.P.F.G," "Trapture" – Ika Dry (Gus & Dryhump)
- "Straight Outta Frisco" – D-Styles
- "Electrosynthesis" – Bas1

== Awards and selections ==
- Best Documentary at the Bare Bones International Film Festival
- DC International Film Festival: Official Selection
- Documenta Madrid: Official Selection
- Hi/Lo Film Festival: Official Selection
- Rhythm of the Line - International Graffiti & Hip-hop Film Festival, Berlin: Official Selection
