= Nic Hill =

American film director (born 1981)

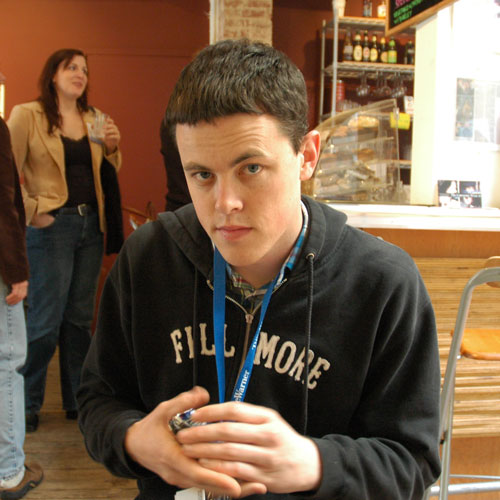
- Born: May 24, 1981 (age 45); San Diego, California, United States
- Education: University of San Francisco
- Occupation: Film director

Nic Hill is an American film director. He has directed films including Truth in Numbers?, Tokyo to Osaka, and Piece by Piece.

== Filmography ==
| Year | Film | Role |
|---|---|---|
| 2005 | Piece by Piece | Director, producer, editor |
| 2005 | Dark Places | Editor |
| 2005 | Music video: MC Rajh, "Piece by Piece" | Director |
| 2008 | Music video: TOPR, "Security Security" | Director |
| 2010 | Tokyo to Osaka | Director, producer, editor |
| 2010 | The Violent Kind | Editor, producer |
| 2010 | Ray Charles America | Editor |
| 2010 | Truth in Numbers? | Director, producer, editor |
