= Andrew Keen =

British-American entrepreneur and author (born 1960)

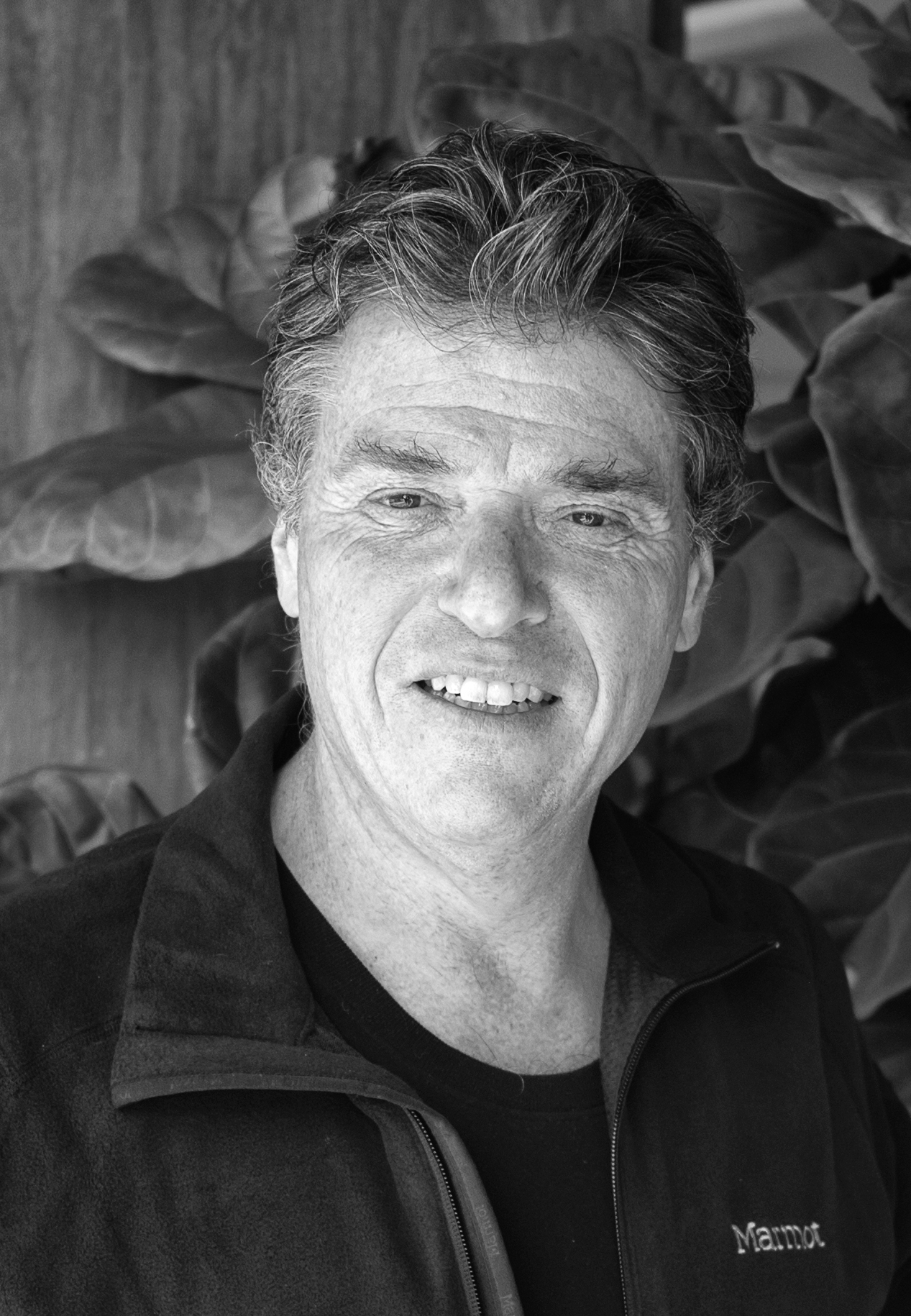
- Keen in 2017
- Born: c. 1960 (age 65–66); Hampstead, London, England
- Education: University of London (BA); University of California, Berkeley (MA)
- Occupations: Author, teacher, entrepreneur, and public speaker
- Known for: The Cult of the Amateur; Digital Vertigo; The Internet is Not the Answer; How to Fix the Future
- Andrew Keen introducing himself recorded April 2015

Andrew Keen (born c. 1960) is a British-American entrepreneur and author. He is particularly known for his view that the current Internet culture and the Web 2.0 trend may be debasing culture, an opinion he shares with Jaron Lanier and Nicholas G. Carr among others. Keen is especially concerned about the way that the current Internet culture undermines the authority of learned experts and the work of professionals.

== Life ==
Keen was born in Hampstead, North London, to a Jewish family. He attended the University of London, studying History under Hugh Seton-Watson, a British historian and political scientist. Keen earned a bachelor's degree in history and then studied at the University of Sarajevo in Yugoslavia. Having been influenced by Josef Škvorecký, Danilo Kiš, Jaroslav Hašek and especially the writings of Franz Kafka; Keen relocated to America, where he earned a master's degree in political science from the University of California, Berkeley, studying under Ken Jowitt. After Berkeley, Keen taught modern history and politics at Tufts University, Northeastern University and the University of Massachusetts Amherst. He currently lives in San Francisco, California with his family.

== Career ==
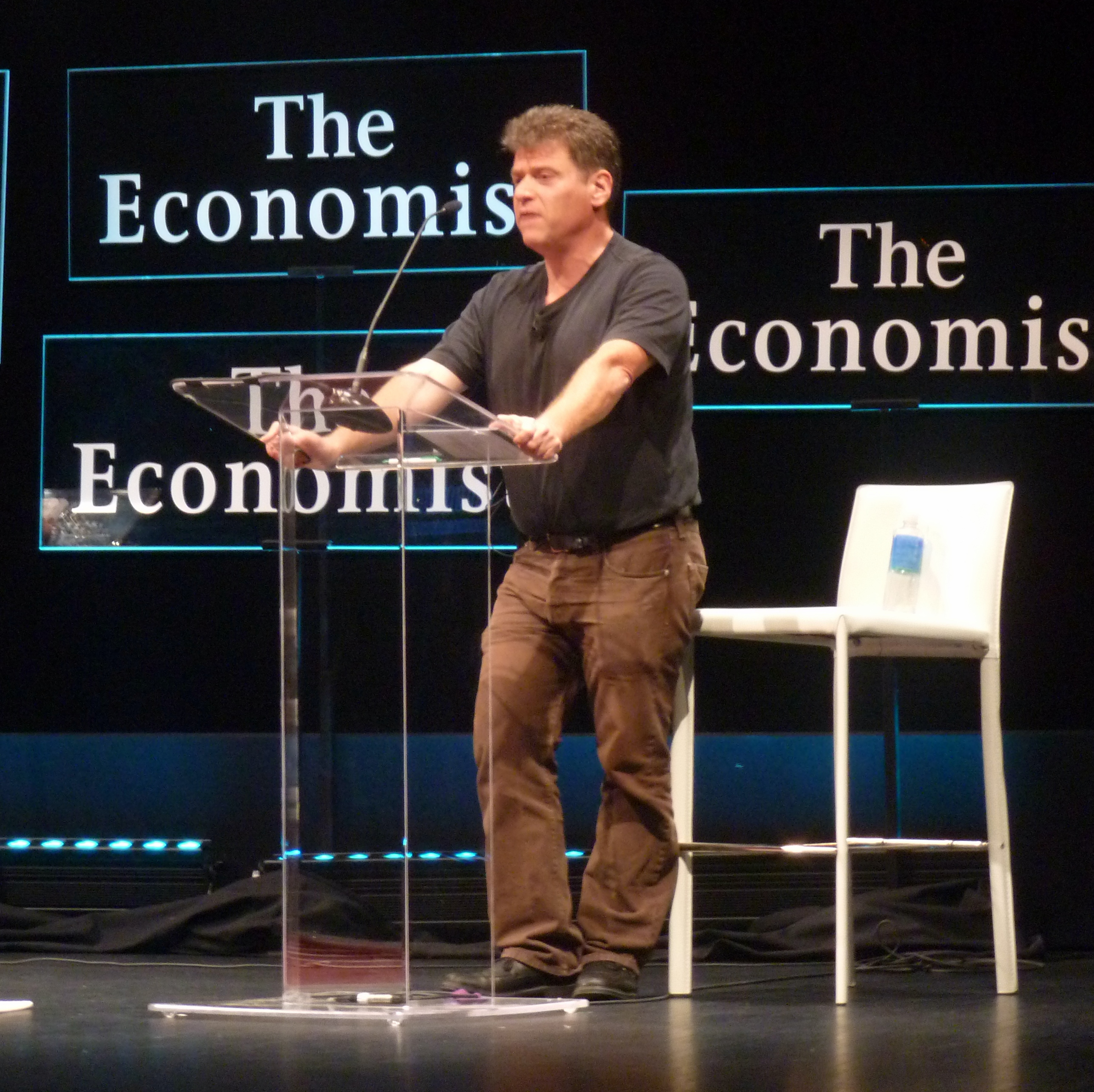
Andrew Keen in San Francisco in 2012

Keen returned to Silicon Valley in 1995 and founded Audiocafe.com, which received funding from Intel and SAP. The firm folded in April 2000 and after the demise of Audiocafe.com, Keen worked at various technology companies including Pulse 3D, SLO Media, Santa Cruz Networks, Jazziz Digital and Pure Depth, where he was director of global strategic sales. Keen stated in October, 2007, that he is working on his new book, tentatively titled, Star Wars 2.0.

In 2013, Keen founded FutureCast, a salon-style event series hosted by the AT&T Foundry and Ericsson, which brings together start-up entrepreneurs, investors, and technologists to discuss the digital revolution. He is currently the host of "Keen On" show, a TechCrunch chat show.

== Views ==
=== Criticism of Web 2.0 ===
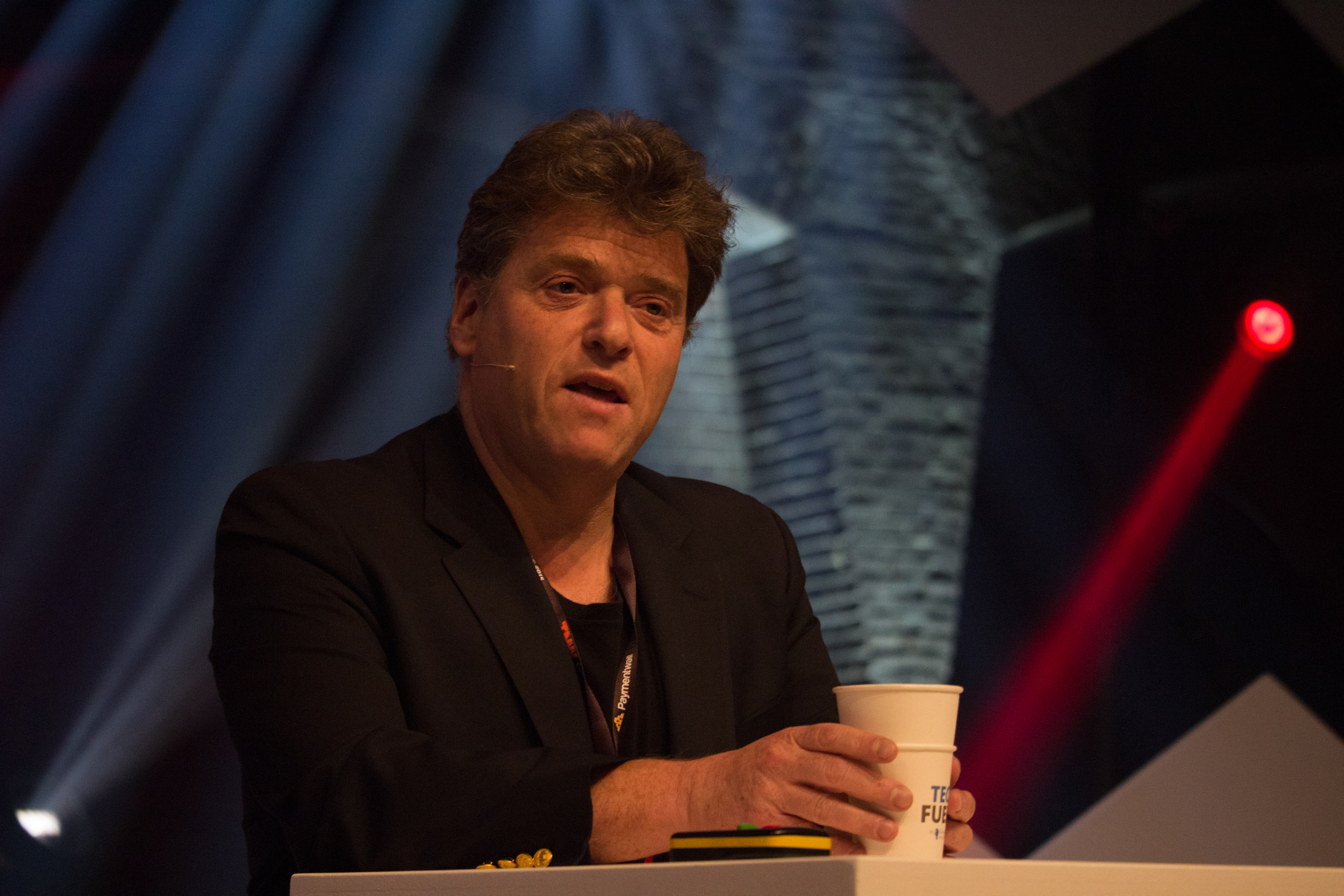
Keen speaking in Amsterdam in April 2015

In 2005, Keen wrote that Web 2.0 is a "grand utopian movement" similar to "communist society" as described by Karl Marx. He also states:

It worships the creative amateur: the self-taught filmmaker, the dorm-room musician, the unpublished writer. It suggests that everyone – even the most poorly educated and inarticulate amongst us – can and should use digital media to express and realize themselves. Web 2.0 "empowers" our creativity, it "democratizes" media, it "levels the playing field" between experts and amateurs. The enemy of Web 2.0 is "elitist" traditional media.

— Andrew Keen, The Weekly Standard

On 5 June 2007, Keen released his first book The Cult of the Amateur, published by Doubleday Currency, and gave a talk at Google the same day. The book is critical of free, user-generated content websites such as Wikipedia, YouTube, Digg, Reddit and many others. He prominently featured in the 2008 Dutch documentary The Truth According to Wikipedia and was also featured in the 2010 American documentary Truth in Numbers?.

Keen stresses the importance of media literacy and claims that user generated blogs, wikis and other "democratized" media, cannot match the resources of mainstream media outlets. Pointing to examples like being able to gather teams together, travel to dangerous locations (sometimes spending years in the region) and having skilled and experienced editors oversee the process, Keen forecasts that if the current Web 2.0 mentality—where content is either given away or stolen—continues, in 25 years there will not exist a professional music business, newspaper industry or publishing business and challenges his audience to question whether they value these or not.

Keen discusses often-overlooked problems with participatory technology. He describes the Internet in amoral terms, saying it is a mirror of human culture. "We see irreverence, and vitality, and excitement. We see a youthfulness. But we also see, I think, many of the worst developments in modern cultural life, and, in particular, I think we see what I call digital narcissism, this embrace of the self. It's Time magazine's person of the year for last year was you." Keen is also heavily critical of anonymity on the Internet, believing that it makes users behave worse, not better. He says: "The Web's cherished anonymity can be a weapon as well as a shield." Showing that misbehavior using anonymity has been so widely adopted, new definitions such as "trolls" and "sock puppets" have emerged.

=== Criticism of social exhibitionism ===
In the book Digital Vertigo, Keen argues that the "hypervisibility" promoted by social networks like Facebook and Twitter traps users into sacrificing vitally important parts of the human experience, like privacy and solitude. He compares the experience of participating in modern social networks with Jeremy Bentham's Panopticon, concluding that: "The future should be anything but social."

He is not without his critics. Tim O'Reilly has said: "he was just pure and simple looking for an angle, to create some controversy to sell a book, I don't think there's any substance whatever to his rants."

=== Criticism of the Internet ===
In his book The Internet Is Not the Answer, Keen presents the history of the internet and its impact on psychology, economy, and society. He argues that the more the internet develops, the more detrimental it is to those who use it.

Keen writes: "It is more like a negative feedback loop, a digital vicious cycle in which it is us, the Web's users, who are its victims rather than beneficiaries". Keen goes on to argue that the internet has allowed for the emergence of "new, leviathan-like monopolists like Apple, Google, and Amazon," impeding economic competition and economic justice between the rich and poor. Keen also argues that the internet encourages intolerance and that "rather than fostering a cultural renaissance, it has created a selfie-centered culture of voyeurism and narcissism".

=== On the Digital Revolution ===
Published in 2018 by Grove Atlantic, Keen's most recent book How to Fix the Future deals about how societies need to address the challenges caused by the Digital Revolution as they did with its counterpart the Industrial Revolution, which similarly disrupted human lives and various industries. Rather than a critique on current technology, How to Fix the Future showcases what global leaders are doing to mitigate the effects of new technology on politics, culture, society, etc. Keen argues that people must try to preserve human values in an increasingly digital world and ensure the future is something everyone can look forward to again.

According to Keen, there are five key tools to addressing the negative effects caused by the Digital Revolution, including changes in regulation, competitive innovation, social responsibility, education, and worker and consumer choice.

== Published works ==
1. The Cult of the Amateur, Crown Publishing Group, 2007, ISBN 9780385520805
2. Digital Vertigo, St. Martin's Press, 2012, ISBN 9780312624989
3. The Internet Is Not The Answer, Atlantic Monthly Press, 2015, ISBN 9780802123138
4. How to Fix the Future, Grove Atlantic, 2018, ISBN 9780802126641
