= Truth in Numbers? =

2010 American documentary film by Scott Glosserman and Nic Hill

Truth in Numbers? Everything, According to Wikipedia
- Film poster
- Directed by: Scott Glosserman; Nic Hill
- Produced by: Michael Ferris Gibson; Scott Glosserman; Nic Hill
- Cinematography: Eric Koretz; John Murillo
- Edited by: Madeleine Gavin; Nic Hill; John Murillo
- Music by: Jeff MacDonald
- Production company: Underdog Pictures
- Distributed by: GlenEcho Entertainment
- Release date: July 2010
- Running time: 85 minutes
- Country: United States
- Language: English
- Budget: $55,134

Truth in Numbers? Everything, According to Wikipedia is a 2010 American documentary film that explores the history and cultural implications of the online, editable encyclopedia Wikipedia. The film considers the question of whether all individuals or just experts should be tasked with editing an encyclopedia.

The site's history and background is given, along with commentary from Wikipedia founders Jimmy Wales and Larry Sanger. Commentators that appear in the film include author Howard Zinn, Len Downie of The Washington Post, Bob Schieffer of CBS News, former Encyclopædia Britannica chief Robert McHenry and former Central Intelligence Agency director James Woolsey. The documentary discusses incidents that shed a negative light on Wikipedia, including the Essjay controversy and the Wikipedia biography controversy.

The long-delayed film premiered at Wikimania 2010 in Gdańsk in July 2010, and was screened at the Paley Center for Media in New York City on October 20, 2010. It was shown as part of the Savannah Film Festival on November 3, 2010, at Savannah College of Art and Design's Trustees Theater. Truth in Numbers? received a mixed reception, with favorable commentary from author Ted Leonsis, in the AOL publication Urlesque, and coverage at the Savannah Film Festival by Carlos Serrano of District.

== Contents ==
Truth in Numbers? Everything, According to Wikipedia, an American documentary film, explores the history and cultural implications of Wikipedia. The film presents Wikipedia as a new form of communication and cultural dialog. The directors attempt to answer the question of whether ordinary individuals should be tasked with collecting knowledge for presentation online, or this should be relegated solely to academic scholars in specific fields. The film gives an overview of the history of the enterprise, as well as biographical information on founder Jimmy Wales. Wales is shown discussing Wikipedia with an Indian reader, who points out an inaccuracy in an article. Wales proceeds to show the reader how to click the "edit" tab on the website. Wikipedia founder Larry Sanger is featured in the documentary and speaks critically about the website's embracing of editors from the general public as opposed to soliciting expert contributors.

Journalism and media commentators who appear and are interviewed in the film include author Howard Zinn; Len Downie, (executive editor of The Washington Post); Bob Schieffer (CBS News); Robert McHenry (former chief of Encyclopædia Britannica); R. James Woolsey Jr. (former director of the Central Intelligence Agency); Chris Wilson (reporter for Slate Magazine); Cade Metz (reporter for The Register who has written critically about Wikipedia); Richard Branson and Noam Chomsky. The film documents an initiative in India and Africa called "Wikipedia Academies". Controversies discussed in the film include the Essjay controversy, where a member of Wikipedia made false assertions about his academic background; and the Wikipedia biography controversy, where false statements were inserted into the Wikipedia entry for journalist John Seigenthaler. Musician KRS-One comments about the site after reading his biography on Wikipedia: "I can say to you, these are the facts but they are not true."

== Production ==
=== Conception ===
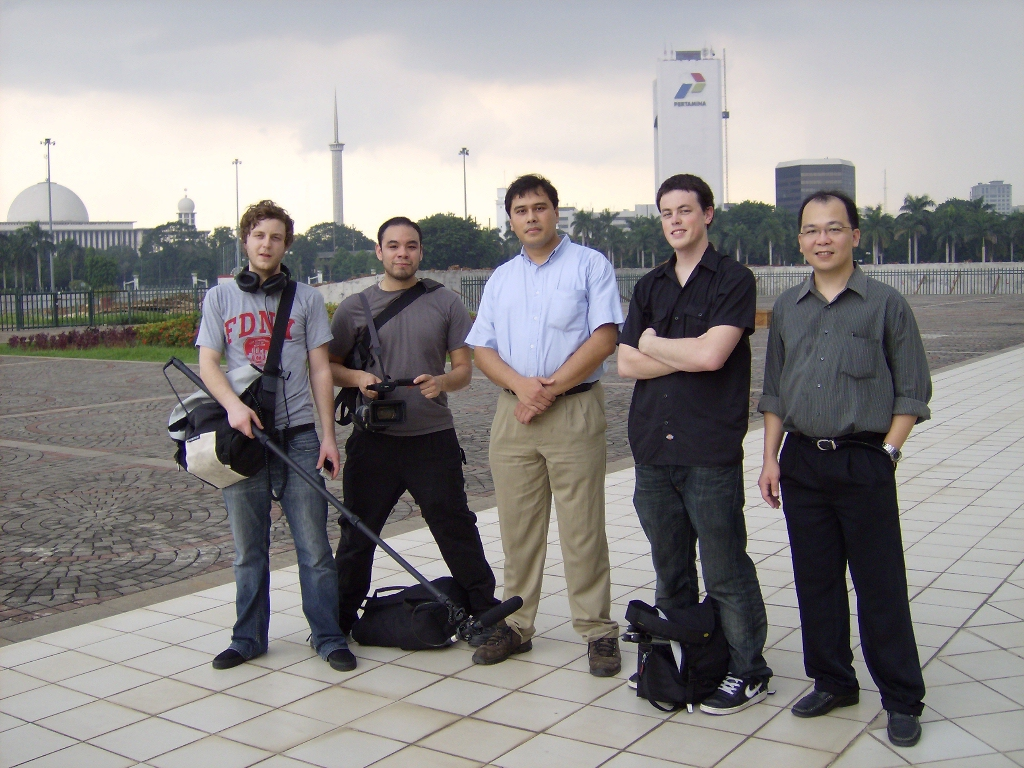
Documentary production team in Indonesia (February 2007)

The idea for the film originated from a suggestion by Michael Ferris Gibson, who had made the 2005 documentary 24 Hours on Craigslist. Gibson, a producer on the film, met with co-director Nic Hill. Gibson financed Hill's travels while making the film. The working title for the film was Truth in Numbers: The Wikipedia Story. Gibson chose to finance the film through a request for funding from Internet visitors; the initial request drew in US$20,000 in initial investment. The production team made their initial work on the project known to Internet viewers via the website www.wikidocumentary.org. Another collaborative website focused on the documentary was formed at Wikia, located at wikidocumentary.wikia.com. Regarding his financing strategy, Gibson commented to the San Francisco Chronicle, that smaller incremental donations from multiple individuals showed genuine interest in his initiative.

=== Filming ===
Filming started in August 2006 at the Wikimania 2006 conference, and by April 2007 the team had aggregated 100 hours of footage. Co-director Hill accompanied Wales during 2007, filming him as he journeyed around the globe. Hill took a two-person film crew and traveled to China, Indonesia, India, South Africa, Australia and Europe, interviewing editors and contributors. Hill is himself an editor of Wikipedia, starting an article about a graffiti artist. Gibson and Hill required expertise in the creative and funding aspects of film-making and invited Scott Glosserman to join the venture. Glosserman's involvement with the film began during the 2007–2008 Writers Guild of America strike. After Glosserman signed on, the breadth of the endeavor became larger. The film ended up taking an additional three years to finish after Glosserman joined the production.

Eric Koretz served as director of photography; he joined the team during a shift in focus in January 2008. Koretz used a Panasonic AG-HPX500 P2 HD camcorder. He commented to industry publication Videography about the choice of technique, that due to the intensity of the production team's travel schedule tape format would not have been an option. He stated he preferred using P2 cards over the HDD-based format due to its superior reliability. During the editing process, Glen Echo Entertainment utilized eight Apple Macintosh computers with Intel processors, equipped with Apple's Final Cut Pro editing software.

=== Re-focus ===
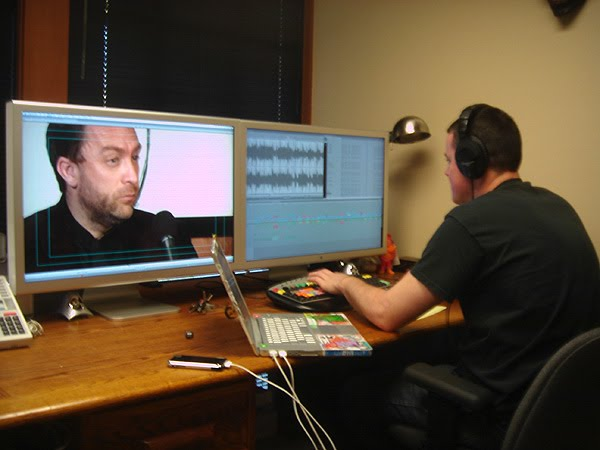
Nic Hill editing the movie

Glosserman and the rest of the production team met together to put together a focus for the film; they centered their efforts on answering the question: "How does Wikipedia get at the truth?" They also wanted to provide information for everyday individuals wanting to know about Wikipedia's background and functioning. Experts were sought out, including the author of The Age of American Unreason Susan Jacoby, to discuss Wikipedia's approach to scholars knowledgeable about specific subject matter. Glosserman commented in an interview with IndieWire, "We tried to get people offering compelling arguments for either side of any particular topic because our intention was to be objective and to let the viewer make up his or her own mind." The narrative structure of the 2004 film What the Bleep Do We Know!? served as an inspiration for Glosserman during the production process. As a non-profit project, the film had received more than $55,000 in donations by March 2009.

== Release ==
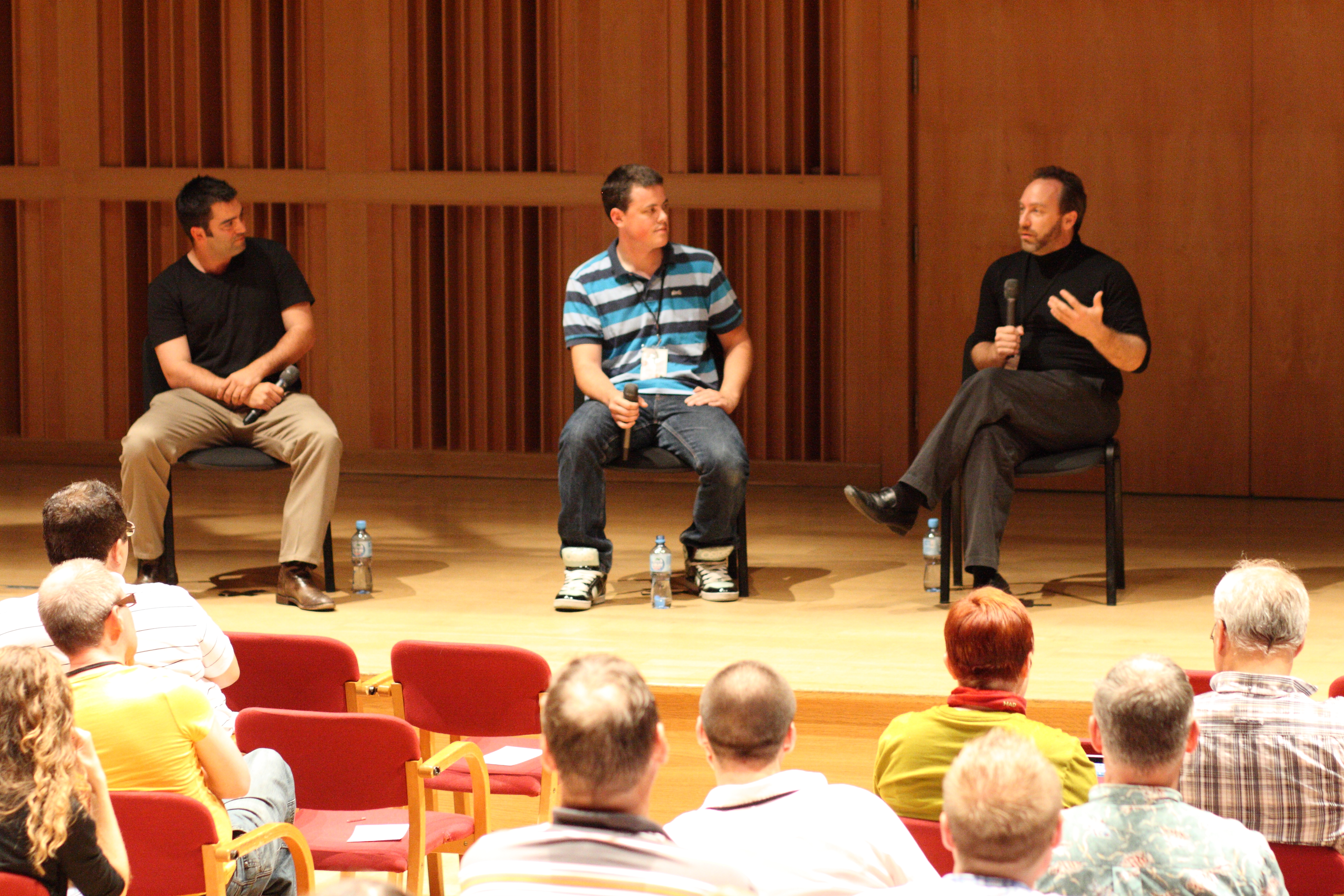
Left to right: the directors Nic Hill and Scott Glosserman with Jimmy Wales in Gdańsk, July 10, 2010

Interview with Nic Hill about the documentary in Gdańsk (July 2010)

The release for the film was originally planned for 2007, then 2008 and 2009, before its 2010 release. Clips of the film were shown at Wikimania 2007 in Taipei prior to its completion. Editors in the audience had mixed views on the film. In 2008, footage from the film was used in an official fundraising video by the Wikimedia Foundation. The film had its premiere at Wikimania 2010 in Gdańsk in July 2010, before an audience of approximately 300 people. A trailer for the movie was released in October 2010.

The film was screened at the Paley Center for Media in New York City on October 20, 2010. It was shown in conjunction with the Robert M. Batscha University Seminar Series. The Paley Center screening included an online streaming broadcast—the first simultaneous film screening and panel question-and-answer for online and local audiences. The panel discussion was moderated by The New York Times journalist Noam Cohen, and featured both co-directors, in addition to Wikimedia Foundation representative Samuel Klein and Wikipedian in Residence at the British Museum Liam Wyatt. After the event, SnagFilms subsequently made the film available for free for six days to viewers in the United States.

The film was screened at the Savannah Film Festival on November 3, 2010, at Savannah College of Art and Design's Trustees Theater. It was scheduled for a limited theatrical release in the United States on November 30, 2010.

== Reception ==
Wales wrote favorably about the film in 2007 during its production, and noted, "Director Nic Hill is making what looks to be a fabulous film about Wikipedia and Wikipedians worldwide." However, Wales commented negatively about the delayed release, in a statement to PRNewser. He said the movie was dated due to its delay. He commented that the documentary was lopsided towards reliance on expert commentary and did not feature enough weight towards depicting community involvement in the online project. Wales posted to a Wikimedia Foundation mailing list, "the film was poorly received in Poland, and it is seriously out of date." Larry Sanger commented he thought the film was, "Not too bad, from what I saw." Wikimedia Foundation board member Samuel Klein commented, "In general, I like the film a lot more after seeing it for the second time, in a very different audience (and seeing their live reactions)." Sage Ross, an attendee of Wikimania 2010, commented that the film appears to take a mainly negative point of view towards Wikipedia, "The film gives a lot of focus to some shallow or misleading lines of criticism, and on an intellectual level, it comes off as largely anti-Wikipedia, contrasting the reasonable-sounding arguments of mature critics with the naive optimism of youthful Wikipedians." Author Ted Leonsis commented favorably about the documentary, at his blog, Ted's Take, characterizing it as, "A great film about the Wikipedia movement." He concluded, "This is a must see film, a premiere [sic] film. You gotta watch it to remain socially relevant!"

Daniel D'Addario reviewed the documentary for the AOL Inc. publication, Urlesque. D'Addario commented, "the film raises interesting questions about authority, only somewhat intentionally." He noted the dated bits observing, "Truth in Numbers? may well be coming too late." D'Addario concluded his assessment by noting that at the time of his review, the Wikipedia article for the film was under threat of being deleted: "According to the site, the entry for Truth in Numbers? is being considered for deletion – it links to few other articles on the site, and is an 'orphan.' Given the tenor of Truth in Numbers?, which combines avid interest in Wikipedia with wide-eyed dismay at much of its particulars, this is either very surprising or not surprising at all."

In his review for the Savannah Film Festival, Carlos Serrano of District wrote that though the subject matter covered a lot of ground, it utilized an efficient presentation: "Sounds like a lot to put in to one movie, but the film manages to make good use of its 85 minute running time." Serrano commented on the presentation of Jimmy Wales during the film, "In the end, I came out of the theater thinking of him as a three-dimensional figure, very much a man with passion but neither completely good or evil. To be honest, this is very important in a film like this and is a definite plus for the movie." Serrano recommended the documentary, and concluded, "This is definitely a solid film. ... This film is definitely worth a viewing. It’s interesting, well made, and presents varied perspectives on Wikipedia that help the narrative stay interesting."

== See also ==
- List of films about Wikipedia
- List of books about Wikipedia
