= ORFN =

American painter

- Born: Aaron Curry; 1974
- Died: December 7, 2016 (aged 41–42); San Francisco, California, U.S.
- Style: Graffiti

ORFN (born Aaron Curry; 1974 – December 7, 2016) was an American artist and reportedly "one of the most prolific graffiti writers in San Francisco Bay Area history."

== Early life and education ==
ORFN was an orphan. He never had a relationship with his biological father, and his mother gave him up as a child because she was unable to care for him. ORFN spent time in several foster and group homes before coming to live with the Curry family in Palo Alto, California as a fifth or sixth grader.

In middle school and as a young teenager, ORFN was a skateboarder who was widely thought to be on the path to sponsorship, but after failing to achieve his goal of becoming sponsored, his enthusiasm for skateboarding waned and his passion for art and graffiti emerged.

ORFN moved to San Francisco in the mid-1990s to attend the San Francisco Art Institute for roughly one year. During the time he was in art school he was not actively writing graffiti.

== Work ==
He was actively writing graffiti and making art in the Bay Area for over 25 years. ORFN used many alternate monikers, including Sad Jose, Helldiver, Muddguts, Chainsaw, Phantasmagoria, Hungry Waif, Vampire Wizard Zeus, and Very Viva Scout. He gained notoriety for the number of San Francisco "bus flow" style tags he placed across the Bay Area, most of which were dated with the year in which they were done. However, his work evolved to include straightforward patterns and tone combinations that often featured smiling faces, sad children, cobwebs, skulls and other spooky imagery executed in a lo-fidelity, accessible, and playful manner. ORFN's work has drawn comparisons to that of Jean-Michel Basquiat. ORFN's work was very rarely included in formal displays. ORFN was a member of a number of graffiti crews, including Under Shadows (US), Big Kid Fun (BKF), Down for Whatever (DFW), Drac the Vamp (DTV), 640, and Big Time Mob (BTM).

== Career ==
ORFN began experimentation with graffiti in middle school, initially spraying stencils in his then hometown of Palo Alto, California. By 1992, ORFN had taken on his namesake moniker and started to make a name for himself as a graffiti writer in San Mateo County and San Francisco, along with his early graffiti partner Revers.

In 1992 ORFN joined the Bay Area-based US crew (which stands for Undeniable Sickness or Under Shadows), with Revers. ORFN continued to represent the US crew throughout his career, and as its leader since the early 2000s, was responsible for ensuring the continuity of the crew when it would have otherwise ceased to exist. ORFN spent years going into the Sunset Tunnel between Cole Valley and Duboce Park writing his moniker on one of the train tracks throughout the span of more than 4,000 feet. ORFN was designated the "Best Graffiti Tag" in the 1996 "Best of the Bay" issue of SF Weekly, where it was noted that his tag was in view all over the San Francisco Bay Area.

== Gallery ==
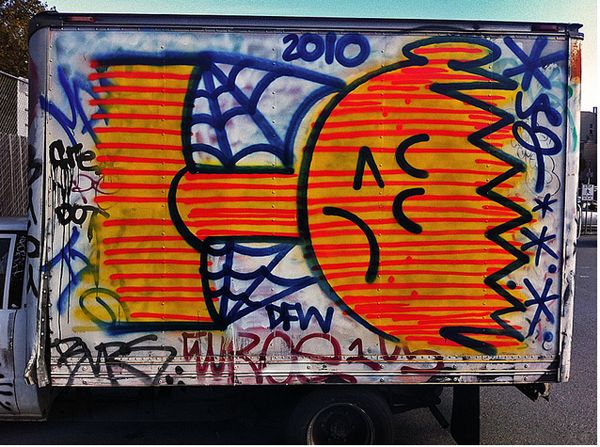

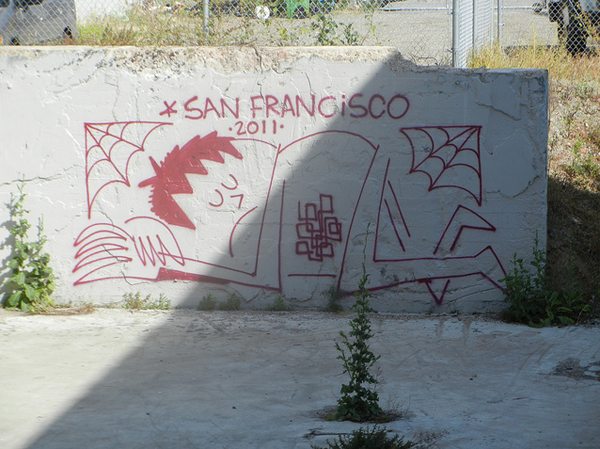

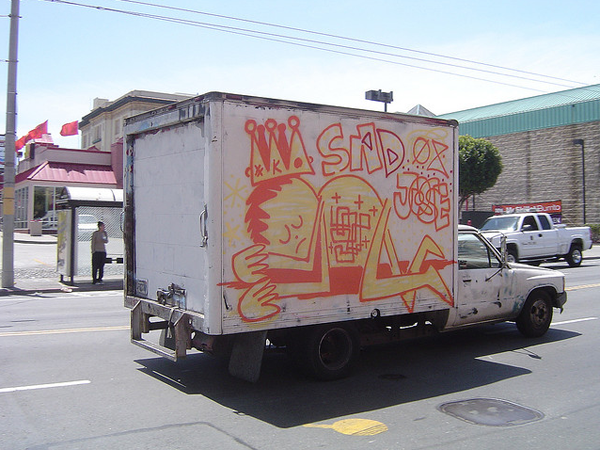

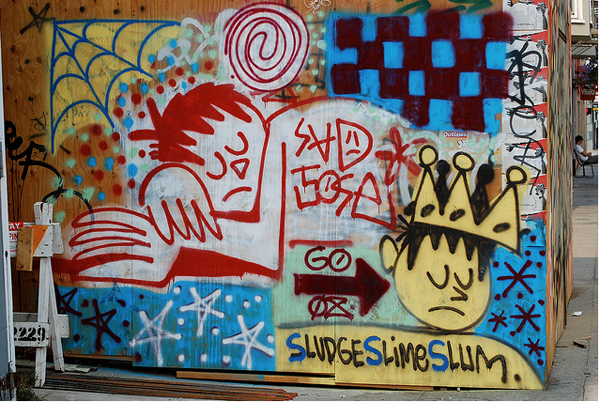

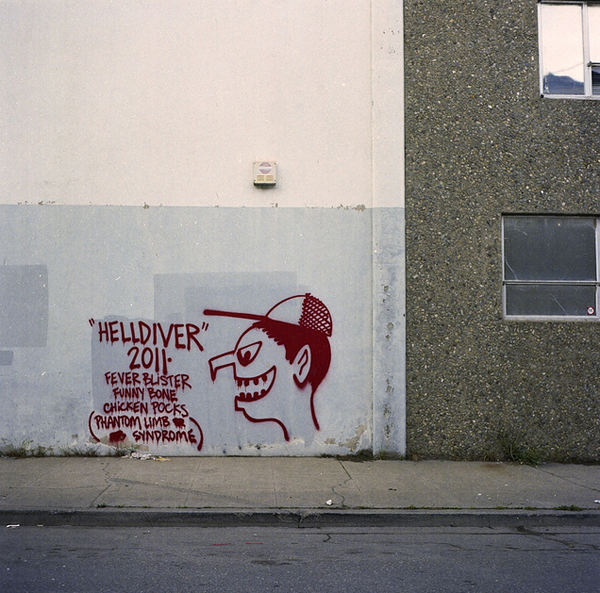

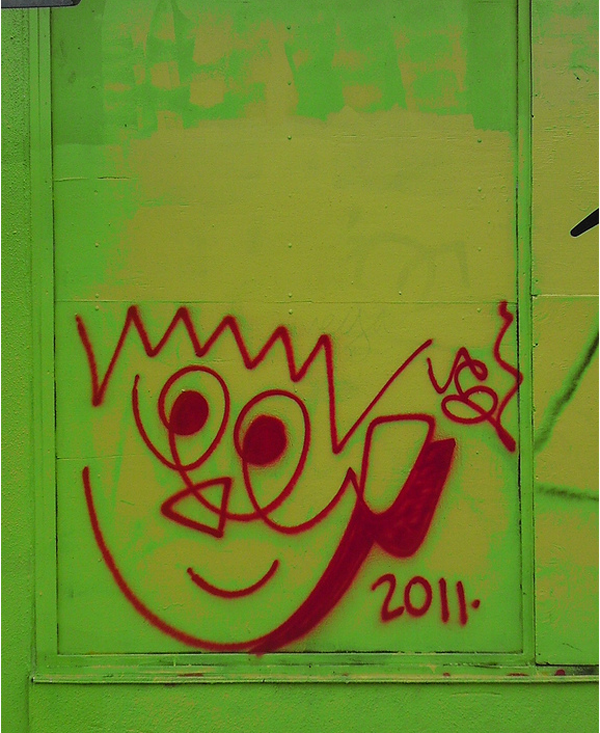

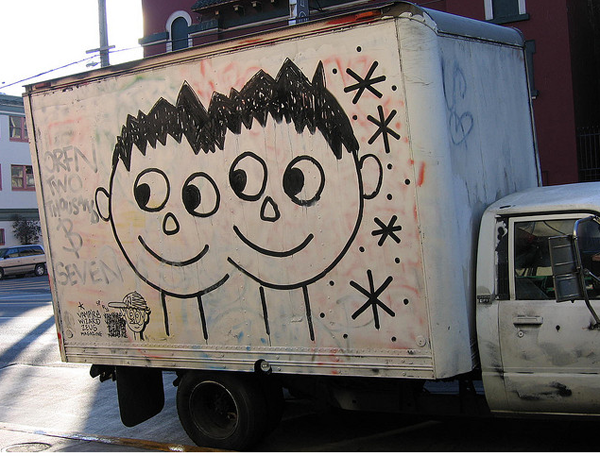

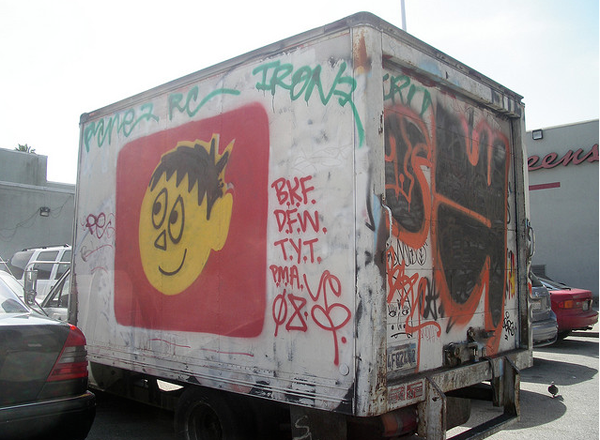

== Exhibitions ==
- Guerrero Gallery: Group Show "New Normal Three", 2015
- ArtPrimo SF: Solo Show "Big Grid", 2015
- V1 Gallery (Copenhagen): Guest of Alicia McCarthy "Snobody", 2015
- Oakland Museum of California: Group Show, featured in "Fertile Ground: Art and Community in California", 2015
- San Francisco Museum of Modern Art: posthumous Guest of Alicia McCarthy "Society for the Encouragement of Contemporary Art (SECA) Award Exhibition", 2017

== Death ==
ORFN died in a San Francisco hospice facility December 7, 2016 of melanoma which affected his stomach, back, spine, liver, heart, lungs, and brain. ORFN was cremated, and his ashes were spread in the Sunset Tunnel by a group of his friends. He is survived by a daughter named Scout.

== In other media ==
Both ORFN and Revers are mentioned in Palo Alto Part II, Wasting by American actor and writer James Franco.

== See also ==
- Piece by Piece, a 2005 documentary film about San Francisco's graffiti scene
