= Aaron Curry (artist) =

American painter and sculptor (born 1972)

Aaron Curry (born 1972 in San Antonio, Texas) is an American painter and sculptor, with works in the collections of the Museum of Modern Art, the Los Angeles County Museum of Art, the Chicago Museum of Contemporary Art and the San Francisco Museum of Art. His work has been shown at the Lincoln Center for the Performing Arts (in 2013) and the Katonah Museum of Art (in 2015) in New York, at the Musée d'art contemporain de Bordeaux in France (in 2014), and at the DeCordova Museum and Sculpture Park in Lincoln, Massachusetts (in 2017).

== Education ==
Aaron Curry received his MFA from ArtCenter College of Design's Graduate Art MFA Program in Pasadena, CA in 2005.

== Career ==
Aaron Curry's work combines painterly marks with sculpture, drawing, collage and installation. His work often juxtaposes bright colors and delicate marks. He embeds his pieces with a sense of humor, playing with his titles and repeated imagery. His work is rooted in a combination of art history and pop cultural references. He draws influence from "the distorted planes of Cubism, the bright colors and flat surfaces of Pop, and sometimes the disconcerting biomorphism of Surrealism". He plays between two-dimensions and three, always considering a 360 degree viewing.

Tune Yer Head at the Bass Museum was on view from October 13, 2018, to April 21, 2019. For the exhibition Curry created bright pink graffiti-styled wallpapered walls for the entry-hallway. The hallway had three off-shooting rooms: one room with two large-scale black sculptures and a neon-light piece, one with bright and colorful collages adorning the walls and a drawn black and white abstract doodle on the carpeted floor, another with a similar black and white pattern on the walls with a large scale sculpture, centered in the room cover in the same pattern. The walls in the hallway are covered with bright pink silkscreened cardboard acts as a wallpaper for the walls and a black painting with equally neon pinks and blues around the canvas, Deeply Spaced Deeply (2018). The large, black sculptures play with balance, one on the ground towers high and another hangs from the ceiling on the other side. The large form has a circular form sits on one end of a long stick atop the form and a chain holds a ball and arc from the other side. The collages in the second room play with circular motifs- faces, heads, circles, etc. They are centered on bright colored backgrounds and sometimes accompanied by a messy "A" or fingerprints around. The last room reuses the same grey-scaled sketch around the room as another wallpaper and the center sculpture stands on a base of the same, with interlocking perpendicular pieces.

== Bad Dimension Press ==
Curry also founded and runs Bad Dimension Press. Through the press he publishes intricate and detailed books artists books and edition-ed objects. His books often contain silkscreened stickers or cut out sections exposing images from other pages, while the objects are often created from Curry's Mold-A-Rama machine.
