= Backlight (TV program) =

- Genre: Documentary television
- Country of origin: Netherlands

Production
- Production company: VPRO

Original release
- Release: 8 September 2002 – present

Backlight (Dutch: Tegenlicht) is a documentary television program by Dutch public broadcasting organisation VPRO. The first episode of Backlight was broadcast on 8 September 2002.

The program "aims to grasp the quintessence of prominent trends and developments" in the practice of critical journalism, and tries to improve understanding of the intricate inner workings of our modern society.

The program won the Zilveren Nipkowschijf in 2005. The episode "Lockerbie Revisited" won the Prix Europa in the category TV Current Affairs in 2009. The episode "Money & Speed", made for iPad, won the Golden Eye at the Dutch Design Awards in 2011.

VPRO released four documentaries in 2009 and 2010 under a Creative Commons license using the content distribution feature of the Mininova BitTorrent tracker.

== Past editions ==
Past Backlight episodes are also available online:

- "The Carlyle Connection" (11 May 2003)
- "Buenos Aires - Human Resources" (22 December 2002)
- "Mamma Please Call Me" (28 November 2002)
- "Flight from Heaven" (14 December 2003)
- "Real Men Don't Rape" (5 October 2003)
- "H'ydrogen Revolution" I & II (13 June 2004)
- "Cuba after Castro" (11 June 2004)
- "My Friend the Mayor" (28 March 2004)
- "The Day the Dollar Falls" (20 November 2005)
- "Saudi Solutions" (6 November 2005)
- "Jeffrey's Policy" (2 October 2005)
- "Noreen's Agenda" (25 September 2005)
- "Purple Hearts" (11 December 2006)
- "The Well-Oiled Revolution of Hugo Chávez" (27 November 2006)
- "Energy War" (30 October 2006)
- "Google: Behind the Screen" (7 May 2006)
- "Three Comrades" (19 February 2006)
- "Saturday is for the Dead" (15 January 2006)
- "Point of View Iran" (17 December 2007)
- "Waste = Food" (17 December 2007)
- "Second Thoughts" (22 October 2007)
- "Democracy's Dilemma" (8 October 2007)
- "The Last Market" (11 June 2007)
- "Caracas - The Informal City" (21 May 2007)
- "Endgame" (7 May 2007)
- "The Israel Lobby" (2 April 2007)
- "In Memoriam Alexander Litvenenko" (15 January 2007)
- "Singapore Inc." (9 February 2009)
- "I Wanna be Boss" (1 December 2008)
- "Here Comes the Sun" (20 October 2008)
- "The Race for the Car of the Future" (29 September 2008)
- "Rising Gulf" (8 September 2008)
- "A Way Out of the War on Terror" (26 May 2008)
- "Daddy is a Martyr" (19 May 2008)
- "The Settler at Kibbutz Karmya" (12 May 2008)
- "The Truth According to Wikipedia" (7 April 2008)
- "Kasparov's Other Russia" (3 March 2008)
- "Lockerbie Revisited" (28 April 2009)
- "California Dreaming" (8 November 2010)
- "A Greek Tragedy" (27 September 2010)
- "After Democracy" (10 May 2010)
- "Energy Risk" (22 March 2010)
- "Exit Afghanistan" (18 January 2010)
- "Money & Speed: Inside the Black Box" (31 January 2011)
- "Digital Amnesia" (7 September 2014)
- "Money for free" (19 June 2015)
- "E-Stonia" (15 June 2015)
- "Power to the patient" (May 2015)
- "Cybertopia - Dreams of Silicon Valley" (25 January 2015)
- "Changemakers" (18 January 2015)
- "The Tax Free Tour"
- "The Cleantech Future"
- "The Food Speculator"
- "Aftermath of a Crisis"
