= Google Behind the Screen =

"Google: Behind the Screen"
- Backlight episode
- Directed by: IJsbrand van Veelen
- Editing by: Doke Romeijn; Frank Wiering
- Original air date: 7 May 2006
- Running time: 51 minutes

"Google: Behind the Screen" (Dutch: "Google: achter het scherm") is a 51-minute episode of the documentary television series Backlight about Google. The episode was first broadcast on 7 May 2006 by VPRO on Nederland 3. It was directed by IJsbrand van Veelen, produced by Nicoline Tania, and edited by Doke Romeijn and Frank Wiering.
