= The Cult of the Amateur =

Book by Andrew Keen

- US cover
- Author: Andrew Keen
- Translator: English
- Language: English
- Subject: Internet; Web 2.0
- Publisher: Currency
- Publication date: June 5, 2007
- Publication place: United States
- Pages: 228
- ISBN: 978-0-385-52080-5

The Cult of the Amateur: How Today's Internet Is Killing Our Culture is a 2007 book written by entrepreneur and Internet critic Andrew Keen. Published by Currency, Keen's first book is a critique of the enthusiasm surrounding user-generated content, peer production, and other Web 2.0–related phenomena.

The book was based in part on a controversial essay Keen wrote for The Weekly Standard, criticizing Web 2.0 for being similar to Marxism, for destroying professionalism and for making it impossible to find high quality material amidst all of the user-generated web content.

== Contents ==
Keen argues against the idea of a read-write culture in media, stating that "most of the content being shared – no matter how many times it has been linked, cross-linked, annotated, and copied – was composed or written by someone from the sweat of their creative brow and the disciplined use of their talent." As such, he contrasts companies such as Time Warner and Disney that "create and produce movies, music, magazines, and television" with companies such as Google. He calls the latter "a parasite" since "it creates no content of its own" and "in terms of value creation, there is nothing there apart from its links."

He elaborates on the point by saying, "Of course, every free listing on Craigslist means one less paid listing in a local newspaper. Every visit to Wikipedia's free information hive means one less customer for a professionally researched and edited encyclopedia such as Britannica." Thus, he concludes that "what is free is actually costing us a fortune." He also refers to changes such as downsizing of newspaper business and the closing of record labels as forms of economic loss caused by Internet-based social changes.

In her New York Times book review, Michiko Kakutani wrote:

Mr. Keen argues that the democratized Web's penchant for mash-ups, remixes and cut-and-paste jobs threaten not just copyright laws but also the very ideas of authorship and intellectual property. He observes that as advertising dollars migrate from newspapers, magazines and television news to the Web, organizations with the expertise and resources to finance investigative and foreign reporting face more and more business challenges. And he suggests that as CD sales fall (in the face of digital piracy and single-song downloads) and the music business becomes increasingly embattled, new artists will discover that Internet fame does not translate into the sort of sales or worldwide recognition enjoyed by earlier generations of musicians.

"What you may not realize is that what is free is actually costing us a fortune," Mr. Keen writes. "The new winners – Google, YouTube, MySpace, Craigslist, and the hundreds of start-ups hungry for a piece of the Web 2.0 pie – are unlikely to fill the shoes of the industries they are helping to undermine, in terms of products produced, jobs created, revenue generated or benefits conferred. By stealing away our eyeballs, the blogs and wikis are decimating the publishing, music and news-gathering industries that created the original content those Web sites 'aggregate'. Our culture is essentially cannibalizing its young, destroying the very sources of the content they crave."

Keen quotes social philosopher Jürgen Habermas about the Internet and related technologies: "The price we pay for the growth in egalitarianism offered by the Internet is the decentralized access to unedited stories. In this medium, contributions by intellectuals lose their power to create a focus." Keen states that most of modern social culture has existed with specific gatekeepers analyzing and regulating information as it reaches the masses. He views this expert-based filtering process as beneficial, improving the quality of popular discourse, and argues that it is being circumvented.

He also criticizes the ability of the Internet to promote social harms such as gambling and pornography. He writes, "It's hardly surprising that the increasingly tasteless nature of such self-advertisements have resulted in social networking sites becoming infested with anonymous sexual predators and pedophiles." He sees "cultural standards and moral values" as "at stake" due to new media innovations.

More broadly, Keen remarks that "history has proven that the crowd is not often very wise" and argues against the notion that mass participation in ideas improve their quality. He highlights that popular opinion has supported "slavery, infanticide, George W. Bush's war in Iraq, [and] Britney Spears" among other things. He warns against a future of "when ignorance meets egoism meets bad taste meets mob rule."

== Reviews and reception ==
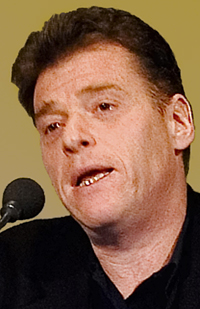
Author Andrew Keen

The book received mixed reviews. Some traditional sources gave the book positive or neutral reviews, while the book received generally negative reactions from bloggers. Michiko Kakutani's New York Times book review called it "a shrewdly argued jeremiad", saying that the book "is eloquent on the fallout that free, user-generated materials is having on traditional media." She wrote that the author "wanders off his subject in the later chapters of the book" but broadly "writes with acuity and passion".

Lawrence Lessig, who was criticized in both the original essay and in the book, wrote an extremely negative review of the book in which he listed what he stated were a multitude of errors in the book including mischaracterizations of Lessig's views and work. Lessig also set up a wiki where users could collaborate in listing problems with the book.

Larry Sanger, co-founder of Wikipedia and founder of the expert-centered wiki Citizendium, gave the book a mixed review. Sanger said that "The book is provocative, but its argument is unfortunately weakened by the fact that Keen is so over-the-top and presents more of a caricature of a position than carefully reasoned discourse." He said that it was hypocritical for Keen to express support for Citizendium, for incorporating expert opinion, when the inherent point of the project is to supply free content, which Keen so opposes in principle. Sanger stated that the book "combines several different criticisms of Web 2.0, incoherently, under the rubric of 'the cult of the amateur'" but the book "is a much-needed Web 2.0 reality check". Tim O'Reilly commented in response to the book, "I find, Andrew Keen's, his whole pitch, I think he was just pure and simple looking for an angle, to create some controversy and sell a book, I don't think there's any substance whatever to his rants." Furthermore, he has said in response to the book, "I think the Internet is often held to another standard. You don't say, 'Why aren't the newspapers writing about Bismarck, he is more important than Pamela Anderson.' But people will say that about Wikipedia. It's just bias."

Anthony Trewavas, professor at the Institute of Molecular Plant Science at the University of Edinburgh, discussed the book in an article in Trends in Biotechnology. Trewavas wrote that Keen's "concern is the blurring of the distinction between the qualified and informed professional and the uninformed and unqualified amateur", expressing concerns that this social change can hold back agricultural development. Trewavas stated as well, "in agriculture, pesticides, food and farming, expert scientific knowledge and experience is seemingly regarded as having no more weight than that of the opinionated, unqualified (and inexperienced) environmentalist." The book has also been discussed in academic publications negatively, expressing how Keen has considered the worst aspects of a complex social movement while ignoring the demonstrable benefits that have been brought through initiatives such as OpenStreetMap, an expression of Volunteered Geographic Information.

Dariusz Jemielniak and Aleksandra Przegalinska noted that Keen failed to distinguish between for-profit and non-profit aspects of the amateur participation (platform capitalism represented by companies such as Uber or Airbnb vs commons-based peer production represented by communities such as Wikipedia or Linux). They further note that Keen assumes that there is always a stark difference between quality of work produced by professionals and amateurs, which is not always the case. Keen's criticism is valid if the result is low quality product that drives the higher quality product out of existence, but a number of products of the amateur community have been shown to be of comparable quality to professional products, and have been offered for a cheaper price, or completely free.

== Jarvis–Keen debate ==
Jeff Jarvis, who had previously called the original essay in The Weekly Standard "snobs.com," was challenged to a debate over Web 2.0 issues. Jarvis held a discussion on his blog about whether he should debate Keen and then decided to accept the offer.

== See also ==
- Economic effects of Wikipedia
- Media criticism
- Reliability of Wikipedia
- Amusing Ourselves to Death
- An Army of Davids
- "Is Google Making Us Stupid?"
- The Global Trap
- The Wisdom of Crowds
