= Prix Europa =

Annual tri-medial festival held in Berlin, Germany

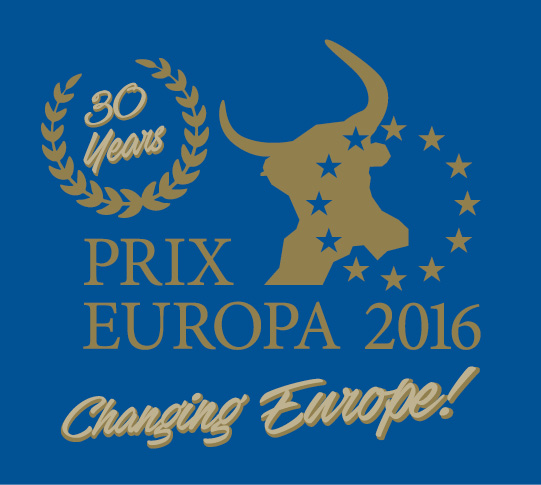
- Poster for the 30th edition of Prix Europa in 2016
- Awarded for: Excellence in television, radio and online
- Sponsored by: Rundfunk Berlin-Brandenburg (RBB)
- Venue: Various venues in Europe; Haus des Rundfunks, Berlin and Potsdam (since 1997)
- Status: Active
- First award: 12 October 1987; 39 years ago
- Website: www.prixeuropa.eu

Prix Europa – The European Broadcasting Festival – is Europe's largest annual tri-medial festival and competition. The event takes place in the third week of October in Berlin, Germany.

Prix Europa awards the best European Television, Radio and Online productions each year with the aim of publishing them throughout Europe and supporting their continental distribution and use. The festival calls on media professionals to compete against each other with their best productions.

The festival is hosted by the German broadcaster Rundfunk Berlin-Brandenburg (RBB).

== History ==
Set up by the Council of Europe and the European Cultural Foundation in 1987 it now has the backing of 30 partners – including institutions like the European Parliament, the European Broadcasting Union (EBU), the European Alliance for Television and Culture, the Land Berlin, the Land Brandenburg, the Rundfunk Berlin-Brandenburg (RBB), the Medienanstalt Berlin-Brandenburg, the Medienboard Berlin-Brandenburg, and the following European broadcasters:

- ARTE
- BBC Radio
- Danish Broadcasting Company
- Dutch Public Service Broadcaster
- France Télévisions
- Magyar Televízió
- Norsk rikskringkasting
- Österreichischer Rundfunk
- Radio Télévision Belge Francophone
- Raidió Teilifís Éireann
- Radio Russia
- SRG SSR
- Sveriges Radio
- Sveriges Television
- Swedish Educational Broadcasting Company
- Telewizja Polska S.A.
- Vlaamse Radio- en Televisieomroeporganisatie
- Yleisradio
- Zweites Deutsches Fernsehen
- Česká televize
- Deutschlandradio

In 1997, the Prix Futura Berlin, which had been launched in 1969, and the Prix Europa merged turning the festival to support both television and radio productions. And additionally in 2000 the Dutch PRIX IRIS amalgamated with Prix Europa awarding the “Best European TV Programme of the Year about Cultural Diversity”.

Starting 2001, the online media has been represented with the award “The Best European Online Project of the Year “ and from 2016 onwards the Online Category productions will also be awarded with an honorary prize open to the entire Prix Europa community via a web-based voting platform.

During the festival week, several broadcasting relevant special events are held for participants to the larger public together with local institutions and embassies.

== Prix Europa Categories 2024 ==
Prix Europa's competition is held in several television, radio and online categories.

Prix Europa has juries open to all programme makers across the continent of Europe. All competition entries are assessed in a public debates.

AUDIO CATEGORIES:

Audio Documentary

Prix Europa Best European Audio Documentary of the Year

Prix Europa Best European Audio Documentary Series of the Year

Audio Investigation

Prix Europa Best European Audio Investigation of the Year

Prix Europa Best European Audio Investigation Series of the Year

Audio Fiction

Prix Europa Best European Audio Fiction of the Year

Prix Europa Best European Audio Fiction Series of the Year

Audio Music

Prix Europa Best European Audio Music Programme of the Year

DIGITAL MEDIA CATEGORY

Prix Europa Best European Online Media Project of the Year

Prix Europa Best European Online Youth Project of the Year

VIDEO CATEGORIES

Video Documentary

Prix Europa Best European Video Documentary of the Year

Prix Europa Best European Video Factual Series of the Year

Video Investigation

Prix Europa Best European Video Investigation of the Year

Video Fiction

Prix Europa Best European Video Fiction of the Year

Prix Europa Best European Video Fiction Mini-Series of the Year (up to 6 episodes)

Prix Europa Best European Video Fiction Series of the Year

Prix Europa IRIS

Best European Media Project of the Year about Identity, Diversity and Inclusion

Prix Europa European Journalist of the Year

== Awards ==
Each of the TV categories, Radio categories and the Best European Online Project of the Year winners is awarded the Prix Europa Trophy.

- Prix Europa – Best European Video Documentary of the Year
- Prix Europa – Best European Video Factual Series of the Year
- Prix Europa – Best European Video Investigation of the Year
- Prix Europa – Best European Video Fiction of the Year
- Prix Europa – Best European Video Fiction Mini-Series of the Year (up to 6 episodes)
- Prix Europa IRIS – Best European Media Project of the Year about Identity, Diversity and Inclusion
- Prix Europa – Best European Audio Documentary of the Year
- Prix Europa – Best European Audio Documentary Series of the Year
- Prix Europa – Best European Audio Investigation of the Year
- Prix Europa – Best European Audio Investigation Series of the Year
- Prix Europa – Best European Audio Fiction of the Year
- Prix Europa – Best European Audio Fiction Series of the Year
- Prix Europa – Best European Audio Music Programme of the Year
- Prix Europa – Best European Online Media Project of the Year
- Prix Europa – Best European Online Youth Project of the Year
