= Robert McHenry =

American encyclopedia editor (born 1945)

Robert Dale McHenry (born April 30, 1945) is an American editor, encyclopedist, philanthropist and writer. McHenry worked from 1967 for Encyclopædia Britannica Inc. or associated companies, becoming editor-in-chief of the Encyclopædia Britannica in 1992, a position he held until 1997. McHenry is also author of the book How to Know (2004), and a frequent contributor to journals.

== Early life and education ==
McHenry was born in St. Louis, Missouri. He attended Northwestern University in Evanston, Illinois, and received a Bachelor of Arts degree in 1966. He also received a master's degree from the University of Michigan in 1967. Later in life, McHenry undertook further study at Northwestern University, where he graduated from Northwestern's Kellogg School of Management with a Master of Business Administration in 1987.

== Editorial career ==
McHenry's career at Encyclopædia Britannica Inc. began in 1967. After two years, he transferred to San Francisco Productions to work for Mortimer Adler, where he co-edited (with Charles Van Doren) Webster's Guide to American History, A Documentary History of Conservation in America, and Webster's American Biographies. McHenry transferred in 1975 to G. & C. Merriam Co. (later renamed Merriam-Webster Inc.) where he edited Webster's American Military Biographies, Famous American Women, Liberty's Women, and Webster's New Biographical Dictionary.

McHenry returned to Britannica in 1982 as editor of Compton's Yearbook, which was an annual supplement to Compton's Encyclopedia. McHenry later joined the editorial staff of the Encyclopædia Britannica, initially as director of Britannica yearbooks, later progressing to become managing editor of the encyclopedia itself in 1986, general editor in 1990, and editor-in-chief in 1992.

McHenry played a key role in the launch in 1994 of the Encyclopædia Britannica in two electronic forms; a CD-ROM version, Britannica CD, and an Internet version, Britannica Online, which was the first Internet-based encyclopedia.

McHenry believes that Britannica failed to exploit its early advantages in the market for electronic encyclopedias. Britannica had, for example, published the first multimedia encyclopedia (Compton's MultiMedia Encyclopedia) as early as 1989, but did not launch Britannica CD until 1994, one year after Microsoft launched their Encarta encyclopedia. McHenry believes these failures were due to a reluctance amongst senior management to fully embrace new technology, caused largely by the overriding influence of the sales staff and management. The sales personnel earned commissions from door-to-door selling of the print encyclopedias, which McHenry believes led to decisions about the distribution and pricing of the electronic products, being driven by the desires of the sales personnel, rather than market conditions and customer expectations.

Aided by Britannica's failings, Microsoft took a dominant position in the market for CD-ROM encyclopedias in the 1990s. McHenry had little respect for their achievement, which he believed to be the result of, not only large resources and wide market reach, but a "casual disregard for quality work". In particular, in an article in 1996 (which the senior management at Britannica refused permission to publish) McHenry criticized Microsoft for its policy of having factually different versions of the same article in the various national issues of the encyclopedia. McHenry regarded this practice as "pandering to local prejudices" in order to suit local markets, instead of presenting subjects objectively.

McHenry was replaced as the editor-in-chief of the Encyclopædia Britannica by Dale Hoiberg in 1997.

== Life after Britannica ==
In 1998, McHenry wrote the book How to Know, in which he explored the questions of what we can know and how we know that we know it. Though written in 1998, the book was not published until 2004.

During 2002 and 2003, McHenry worked part-time in a used-book store, and for a company producing Internet content-filtering software. During the same period, McHenry had several articles published in The Chronicle of Higher Education and The Vocabula Review. The articles were mainly about low standards in writing and verbal communication. One exception was a defence of Oprah's Book Club, following hostile comments from some critics.

In 2004, McHenry began writing regularly for TCS Daily about a variety of issues. A favourite topic has been Intelligent design (ID), which he has criticized on several occasions. McHenry has argued that ID is not a theory in the scientific meaning of the word, because it is not based on evidence, it does not generate predictions, and thus cannot be tested. He has described ID as anti-science, because it begins with a conclusion, that some unknown things are unknowable, which is then supported by selected evidence. McHenry has argued that science is the engine of society and the root of economic success. He believes that ID supporters want to stop the engine, not just for themselves, but for everyone else. He views the support of politicians for ID as particularly dangerous.

McHenry has proposed two laws. McHenry's First Law states that 88% of all human behavior amounts to shouting "Hey! Look at me!". McHenry's Second Law states that the flow of 'information' expands to fill any available channel, while actual knowledge remains scarce and available only to those willing to work at it.

McHenry's articles are normally critical in nature, though there is a humorous side to McHenry. One example was an article about his thoughts of the possible meanings of a "No deadly weapons in building" sign he had seen outside a public library. Another example was an article where he weighed up the pros and cons of a suggestion that candidates for the United States Congress be selected by lot, but every apparent con became a pro after further consideration.

McHenry's most recent articles appear in The American, the online magazine of The American Enterprise Institute for which he became a contributing writer in July 2008.

=== Criticism of Wikipedia ===
In 2004, McHenry participated in a review of 7 Wikipedia articles of general interest, reviewing the entry for Encyclopedia, repeating his concerns about the entry's usefulness and giving it a 5/10 rating.

In November 2004, McHenry wrote an article for Tech Central Station (later renamed TCS Daily) in which he criticized Wikipedia, a free-content encyclopedia that anyone can edit. In essence, McHenry's main criticism was that Wikipedia was operating on what he believed was a false premise; that allowing anyone to edit articles, whether or not they were knowledgeable, would lead to evolution of article quality. Belief in the ability of Wikipedia to succeed, he argued, required a faith that "some unspecified quasi-Darwinian process will assure that those writings and editings by contributors of greatest expertise will survive". A secondary criticism was that editors were being self-indulgent, because they spent time on minor alterations while leaving important factual inaccuracies in place, and thus were disregarding the needs of the readers. In a later article about Wikipedia, following the Seigenthaler incident, McHenry restated his earlier objections, and added a criticism that the Wikipedia organisation had been unable to respond adequately to the event.

McHenry's articles about Wikipedia have produced responses from other writers. In a response to McHenry's first article, Aaron Krowne of freesoftwaremagazine.com considered McHenry's article to be an attack on the credibility of the commons-based peer production, for which he saw already strong evidence of success. In a response to McHenry's later article, Tim Worstall, a fellow contributor to TCS Daily, argued that McHenry was wrongly assuming that the editorial process of traditional encyclopedias was effective in preventing inaccuracies. Worstall, drawing on his own experience as a contributor to traditional encyclopedias, argued that the editorial process often fails, because human nature leads editors to take the easy option of consulting other secondary sources, rather than take the extra effort to check primary sources. McHenry published responses to both of these articles.
