= List of online encyclopedias =

This is a list of well-known online encyclopedias that are currently accessible or were formerly accessible on the Internet.

The largest online encyclopedias are general reference works, though there are also many specialized ones. Some online encyclopedias are editions of a print encyclopedia, such as Encyclopædia Britannica, whereas others originated online, such as Wikipedia. Some online encyclopedia use Wikipedia's MediaWiki software or even fork Wikipedia content to create an alternative version.

== General reference ==
Name	Language	Description	Status	Access	Content license	Fork of	Merged with
Wikipedia	Various (see list here)	General interest, wiki	Active	Free	CC BY-SA 4.0, GFDL	None	None
Nupedia	English	Combined with GNUpedia	Defunct	None	GFDL 1.1 or later	None	None
Interpedia	English	General interest, the first site to propose a free encyclopedia written by users	Defunct	None	Unknown	Free	None
Everipedia	English	General interest	Read-only (archived)	Free	CC BY 4.0	Wikipedia	None
Citizendium	English	General interest, wiki	Active	Free, copyleft	CC BY NC SA 3.0	None	None
Conservapedia	English	American conservative interests	Active	Free	Unknown	None	None
Scholarpedia	English	Articles are written by scholars and peer-reviewed for accuracy	Active	Free	CC BY NC SA 3.0	None	None
Encyclopædia Britannica	English	General interest	Active	Limited free access and features, subscription for full access	Unknown	None	None
Baidu Baike	Chinese	Collaborative online encyclopedia hosted by the major Chinese search engine company Baidu	Active	Free	Unknown	None	None
Enciklopedio Kalblanda	Esperanto	General interest. The first online encyclopedia in Esperanto	Defunct	None	CC BY SA 3.0, GFDL	None	Esperanto Wikipedia
EcuRed	Spanish	General interest. Cuban	Active	Free	None	None	None
Encyclopedia.com	English	General interest	Active	Free	None	None	None
Baike.com	Chinese	General interest. China's largest wiki	Active	Free	Unknown	None	None
Brockhaus Enzyklopädie	German	General interest	Active	Limited free access and features, subscription for full access	Unknown	None	None
Columbia Encyclopedia	English	General interest	Active	Free	Unknown	None	None
Crnogorska Enciklopedija	Montenegrin	General interest (hopes to encourage a Montenegrin language Wikipedia)	Defunct	None	Unknown	None	None
Croatian Encyclopedia	Croatian	General and national encyclopedia	Active	Free	Unknown	None	None
Den Store Danske Encyklopædi	Danish	General interest	Active	Free	Unknown	None	None
Digital Universe	English	Collection of articles on educational, cultural, and scientific topics	Defunct	Free	Unknown	None	None
Doosan Encyclopedia	Korean	General interest	Active	Free	Unknown	None	None
Ekşi Sözlük	Turkish	General interest	Active	Free	Unknown	None	None
Encarta (1993–2009)	English	General interest	Defunct	None	Unknown	None	None
Enciclonet	Spanish	General interest	Active	Limited free access and features, subscription for full access	None	None	None
Encyclopædia Britannica 11th Edition (1910–11)	English	General interest	Defunct	Public domain: completely free access from several online sources	None	None	None
Encyclopedia of China	Chinese	General interest	Active	Subscription	Unknown	None	None
Từ điển bách khoa Việt Nam	Vietnamese	General interest. State-sponsored encyclopedia.	Active	Free	Unknown	None	None
Encyklopedia Internautica	Polish	General interest	Active	Free	Unknown	None	None
Enciclopedia Libre Universal en Español	Spanish	Fork of the Spanish Wikipedia, using wiki software, released under the GFDL	Defunct	Free, copyleft	Unknown	None	None
Encyclopædia Universalis	French	General interest encyclopedia published by Encyclopædia Britannica	Active	Subscription	Unknown	None	None
Everything2	English	General interest, users can submit articles on the topic of essentially anything	Active	Free	None	None	None
The Free Dictionary	English, Spanish, German, French, Italian, Chinese, Portuguese, Dutch, Norwegian, Greek, Arabic, Polish, Turkish, Russian	TheFreeDictionary's Encyclopedia draws from various sources, including The Columbia Encyclopedia.	Active	Free	None	None	None
GNE	English	General interest articles are released under a GNU license. Formerly GNUpedia.	Defunct	None	Unknown	None	None
Gran Enciclopèdia Catalana	Catalan	General interest	Active	Free	Unknown	None	None
Grand Larousse encyclopédique	French	General interest	Active	Free	None	None	None
Great Norwegian Encyclopedia	Norwegian (Bokmål)	General interest	Active	Free	Mix of CC (CC BY SA 3.0, CC BY NC SA 3.0) and limited reuse	None	None
Great Russian Encyclopedia	Russian	General interest	Active	Free	Unknown	None	None
Great Soviet Encyclopedia	Russian, English	General interest, often from the former official Soviet viewpoint.	Active	Free	Unknown	None	None
Grokipedia	English	General interest, AI-powered	Active	Free	CC BY-SA 4.0	Wikipedia	None
Hamichlol	Hebrew, English	General interest, designed for Haredim	Active	Free. Copyleft: mirror of Wikipedia content; copyright: original content.	Unknown	Wikipedia	None
Internetowa encyklopedia PWN	Polish	General interest	Active	Free	Unknown	None	None
Krugosvet (Rus. Кругосвет)	Russian	General interest.	Active	Free	Unknown	None	None
Marathi Vishwakosh	Marathi	General Interest	Active	Free	Unknown	None	None
Marefa	Arabic	General interest	Active	Free	Unknown	None	None
Mawdoo3	Arabic	General interest	Active	Free	Unknown	None	None
Metapedia	Hungarian, German, English, Spanish, Swedish, Romanian, Estonian, French, Slovenian, Czech, Portuguese, Norwegian, Danish, Greek, Dutch	Far-right, white nationalist and neo-Nazi encyclopedia	Active	Free	Unknown	None	None
Meyers Konversations-Lexikon 4. ed. 1888 - 1892	German	General interest	Defunct	access from several online sources	Unknown	None	None
Namuwiki	Korean	General interest	Active	Free	CC-BY-NC-SA 2.0 KR	Rigveda Wiki	None
Nationalencyklopedin	Swedish	General interest, comprehensive	Active	Subscription	Unknown	None	None
New World Encyclopedia	English	Project of the Unification movement	Active	Free. Wikipedia fork.	CC BY SA 3.0, GFDL	Wikipedia	None
Oeconomische Encyclopädie (1773-1858)	German	General interest	Defunct	Public domain: completely free access from several online sources	None	None	None
Oxford Bibliographies Online	English		Active	Free	Unknown	None	None
Proleksis Encyclopedia	Croatian	General and national encyclopedia	Active	Free with registration	Unknown	None	None
Ruwiki	Russian	General interest, forked from Russian Wikipedia during the Russo-Ukrainian war	Active	Free	CC BY-SA 4.0	Russian Wikipedia	None
Rigveda Wiki	Korean	General interest	Active	Free	CC-BY-NC-SA 2.0 KR	None	None
Sarvavijnanakosam	Malayalam	General interest	Active	Free	Unknown	None	None
Sogou Baike	Chinese	Collaborative online encyclopedia hosted by the major Chinese search engine company Sogou	Active	Free	Unknown	None	None
Superpedia	Indonesian, Sundanese, Javanese	General interest	Active	Free	Unknown	None	None
Susning.nu (2001–09)	Swedish	A Swedish language wiki	Defunct	None	Unknown	None	None
Tamil Encyclopedia	Tamil	General Interest	Active	Free	Unknown	None	None
Treccani	Italian	General interest	Active	Free	None	None	None
Veropedia	English, Dutch, Spanish	Mirrors stable versions of selected English Wikipedia articles	Defunct	None	Unknown	None	None
Visuotinė lietuvių enciklopedija	Lithuanian	General interest	Active	Free	Unknown	None	None
WIEM Encyklopedia	Polish	General interest	Active	Free	Unknown	None	None
Winkler Prins	Dutch	General interest, three different age levels	Active	Subscription	Unknown	None	None
World Book Encyclopedia	English	General interest	Active	Subscription	Unknown	None	None
Klexikon	German	General interest for children aged six to twelve years	Active	Free	CC BY-SA 3.0	None	None

== Biography ==
Site	Language	Description	Access
Afro-American Encyclopaedia	English	Classic historical encyclopedia (1895)	Free
Australian Dictionary of Biography	English	Entries on notable Australians who have died	Free
Croatian Biographical Lexicon	Croatian	Multi-volume biographical reference work on notable figures from Croatian history	Free
Deutsche Biographie	German	Biographies on notable German speaking people	Free
American National Biography	English	Biographies of notable Americans	Subscription
Dictionary of Irish Architects	English	Biographical information on Irish architects from 1720 to 1940	Free
Kdo byl kdo	Czech	Biographies on notable Czech and Slovak people	Free
Österreichisches Biographisches Lexikon 1815–1950	German	Biographies on notable Austrians	Free
Oxford Dictionary of National Biography	English	Comprehensive 66-volume reference work on notable figures from British history	Subscription
Dictionary of New Zealand Biography	English, Māori	Entries on notable New Zealanders who have died	Free
Dizionario Biografico degli Italiani	Italian	Biographical Dictionary of Italian People, published by the Istituto dell'Enciclopedia Italiana Treccani	Free

== Antiquities, arts, and literature ==
Site	Language	Description	Access
Dictionary of Art Historians	English	Covers topics relating to art historians, art critics, and their dictionaries	Free
Dictionary of Greek and Roman Antiquities	English	Incorporates text from the 19th-century encyclopedia of the same name. Focuses on topics of cultural and historical Greek and Roman significance.	Free
Dictionary of Greek and Roman Biography and Mythology	English	Focuses on topics dealing with Greek and Roman mythology and people	Free
Dictionary of Greek and Roman Geography	English	Focuses on topics relating to Greek and Roman geography	Free
Enciclopedia Dantesca	Italian	Devoted to Dante Alighieri and his time, by the Istituto dell'Enciclopedia Italiana Treccani	Free
The Encyclopedia of Fantasy	English	Covers a wide variety of topics in fantasy fiction such as folklore, fairytales, myths, biblical literature, and horror	Free
Encyclopedia Mythica	English	Covers folklore, mythology, and religion.	Free
Harper's Dictionary of Classical Literature and Antiquities	English	Covers subjects of classical antiquity; text from 1898	Free
The History of Nordic Women's Literature	English, Danish, Swedish	Searchable online English-language version including many biographies	Free
Kindlers Literatur Lexikon	German	Online-only since 2009, covers works and writers of world literature	Subscription
The Literary Encyclopedia	English	Literature related articles	Subscription
Oxford Art Online	English	Visual art; formerly Grove Art Online and The Dictionary of Art. Originally published in 1996 as a 34-volume printed encyclopedia; offered online since 1998.	Subscription
SIKART	English, German, French, Italian	Biographical dictionary and database of Swiss visual art	Free

== Regional interest ==
Site	Language	Description	Access	Content license
Agropedia		Covers topics related to agriculture in India		
Austria-Forum	German, English	Online database of Austrian culture	Free	
Banglapedia	Bengali, English	Bangladesh-related topics	Free	
The Canadian Encyclopedia	English, French	General interest regarding Canada and Canadiana (original content of the hard copy Canadian Encyclopedia)	Free	
Chalo Chatu	English	Collaborative online encyclopedia hosted by Chalo Chatu Foundation featuring comprehensive articles on Zambian culture and history, etc.	Free	
Culinary Heritage of Switzerland	German, French, Italian, Romansh	Online encyclopedia of traditional Swiss cuisine and produce.	Free	
DEDI	English, Slovene	Online encyclopedia of the natural and cultural heritage of Slovenia, operated by the Slovenian Academy of Sciences and Arts Scientific Research Center.	Free	
Dictionary of Sydney	English	Articles on the history and culture of Sydney, Australia	Free	
Encyclopaedia of Islam, 3rd edition	English	About the Islamic world, not a Muslim encyclopedia	Subscription	
Encyclopædia Iranica	English, plans for a future Persian version	Topics on Iranology and the influence of the Iranian peoples throughout history	Free	
The Encyclopaedia of Korea	English	Korea-related topics	Free	
Encyclopedia of Korean Culture	Korean	Korea-related topics	Free	
Encyclopedia Sindhiana	Sindhi	General interest regarding Sindh	Limited free access and features	
Internet Encyclopedia of Ukraine	English	Ukraine, its history, people, geography, society, economy, and cultural heritage, based on the five-volume print Encyclopedia of Ukraine	Free	
Gazetteer for Scotland	English	Articles on the geography and locations of Scotland	Free	
Historical Dictionary of Switzerland	French, German and Italian	Articles on the history of Switzerland.	Free (without illustrations)	CC BY-SA 4.0
Kodansha Encyclopedia of Japan	English	Comprehensive articles on Japanese arts, culture, history, and politics, etc.	Subscription	
Oslo byleksikon	Bokmål (Norwegian)	Online encyclopedia of Oslo, operated by the Society for Oslo Byes Vel, with an emphasis on places, buildings and historical events.	Free	
Panyathai	Thai, limited English	General interest. Designed to honor the Thai king Bhumibol Adulyadej	Free	
Sahapedia	English	Open encyclopedic resource on the arts, cultures, and histories of India.	Free	
Te Ara: The Encyclopedia of New Zealand	English, Māori	Site operated by the New Zealand government regarding information about the country	Free	
Vienna History Wiki	German	Articles on the history of the city of Vienna, Austria. Includes 31,000 entries from the 2nd edition of Historisches Lexikon Wien.	Free	
Turkpidya	English, German, Danish, Spanish, French, Italian, Hungarian, Dutch, Portuguese, Romanian, Turkish, Croatian, Polish, Czech, Greek, Bulgarian, Russian, Serbian, Hebrew, Arabic, Persian, Japanese, and Korean.	Online encyclopedia about Turkey and Turkic Nations	Free	
Unam Wiki	Korean	Wiki with stated South Korean conservative leanings.	Free	

=== US-specific ===
Site	Language	Description	Access
64 Parishes	English	Online encyclopedia of Louisiana, run by the Louisiana Endowment for the Humanities.	Free
Encyclopedia of Alabama	English	Encyclopedia covering the state of Alabama, sponsored by the Alabama Humanities Foundation.	Free
Encyclopedia of Appalachia	English	Dedicated to the region, people, culture, history, and geography of Appalachia.	Defunct
Encyclopedia of Arkansas	English	Project of the Central Arkansas Library System and is the only U.S. state encyclopedia sponsored by a public library	Free
Encyclopedia of Chicago	English		Free
Encyclopedia Virginia	English	Encyclopedia funded by the Virginia Foundation for the Humanities and Library of Virginia, covering topics on Virginia	Free
Handbook of Texas	English	Articles on the U.S. State of Texas	Free
HistoryLink	English	Articles about Washington state history	Free
MNopedia	English	Online encyclopedia about Minnesota, published by the Minnesota Historical Society.	Free
NCPedia	English	Encyclopedia coordinated and managed by the North Carolina Government and State Library of North Carolina, covering a broad spectrum of topics and resources about North Carolina.	Free
New Georgia Encyclopedia	English	Articles on the U.S. state Georgia	Free
The Oregon Encyclopedia	English	Articles about Oregon	Free
Tennessee Encyclopedia	English	Covers the state of Tennessee	Free

== Pop culture and fiction ==
Site	Language	Description	Access
Don Markstein's Toonopedia	English	Focuses on articles about print and animated cartoons	Free
The Encyclopedia of Science Fiction	English	Authors, books, films of sci-fi.	Free
Emojipedia	English	Emoji	Free
Fringepedia	English	Contains articles about the American television drama Fringe.	Free
h2g2	English	Collection of sometimes humorous encyclopedia articles, based on Douglas Adams's The Hitchhiker's Guide to the Galaxy.	Free
Heroes Wiki	English, Dutch, French, German, Hebrew, Italian, Portuguese, Spanish, Swedish, Turkish	Contains articles pertaining to the American television drama Heroes.	Free
Know Your Meme	English	A website and video series which uses wiki software to document various Internet memes and other online phenomena, such as viral videos, image macros, catchphrases, and internet celebrities.	Free
Lostpedia	English, German, Spanish, French, Italian, Japanese, Dutch, Polish, Portuguese, Russian, Chinese	Contains articles pertaining to the hit drama Lost	Free
Memory Alpha	English, Bulgarian, Catalan, Czech, German, Esperanto, Spanish, French, Italian, Japanese, Dutch, Polish, Portuguese, Romanian, Russian, Serbian, Swedish, Ukrainian, Chinese	Articles about Star Trek	Free
Minecraft Wiki	English, Russian, Chinese, Portuguese, Japanese, German, French, Spanish, Ukrainian, Literary Chinese, Korean, Polish (unaffiliated), Dutch, Italian, Thai	"Website for gathering useful information related to the Minecraft franchise".	Free
LyricWiki (2006–20)	Multilingual	Wiki-based lyrics database and encyclopedia	Defunct
The Rocklopedia Fakebandica	English	Articles on fake bands from popular entertainment	Free
Supernatural Wiki	English	Contains articles about the American television drama Supernatural.	Free
Tolkien Gateway	English	J.R.R. Tolkien-related articles	Free
TV Tropes	English, German, Esperanto, Spanish, French, Norwegian, Finnish, Swedish, Al Bhed, Quenya	Articles related to the devices and conventions that a fiction writer can reasonably rely on as being present in the audience members' minds and expectations	Free
The Unofficial Elder Scrolls Pages	English, French, Italian, Portuguese, Arabic	The Elder Scrolls-related articles	Free
Fallout Wiki	English, German, Spanish, Bulgarian, Finnish, French, Georgian, Hungarian, Italian, Japanese, Korean, Lithuanian, Dutch, Norwegian, Polish, Portuguese, Russian, Swedish, Turkish, Chinese	Fallout-related articles	Free
Wookieepedia	English, German, Spanish, Bulgarian, Danish, Finnish, French, Croatian, Hungarian, Italian, Japanese, Dutch, Norwegian, Polish, Portuguese, Russian, Romanian, Slovak, Slovene, Swedish, Turkish, Chinese	Star Wars-related articles	Free
Wowpedia / Warcraft Wiki	English, German, Spanish, French, Czech, Danish, Greek, Persian, Finnish, Hebrew, Hungarian, Icelandic, Italian, Lithuanian, Latvian, Dutch, Nynorsk, Bokmål, Polish, Portuguese, Brazilian Portuguese, Russian, Slovak, Korean, Japanese, Chinese	Warcraft-related articles	Free

== Mathematics ==
Site	Language	Description	Access
Encyclopedia of Mathematics	English	Encompasses articles on the topic of mathematics	Free
Encyclopedia of Triangle Centers	English	Information about ten thousands of triangle centers, including coordinates, operations, incidence, equations, etc.	Free
EqWorld	English, Russian	Articles on mathematical equations	Free
MathWorld	English	Articles on a wide variety of mathematics related topics	Free
On-Line Encyclopedia of Integer Sequences	English	Information about hundred thousands of integer sequences, including formulas, related sequences, programs, etc.	Free/CC BY-NC 3.0
PlanetMath	English	Mathematics related topics and articles	Free/GNU
Stacks Project	English	A mathematics textbook writing project with the aim to cover "algebraic stacks and the algebraic geometry needed to define them"	Free
nLab	English	Category theory and related topics	Free

== Media ==
Site	Language	Description	Access
Bulgarian Rock Archives	Bulgarian	Archives of Bulgarian rock bands.	Free
Canadian Pop Music Encyclopedia	English	Encyclopedia of Canadian pop music	Free
Encyclopaedia Metallum	English	Archives of heavy metal bands	Free
Grove Music Online	English	Mostly on historic and classical music worldwide. It is the online version of The New Grove Dictionary of Music and Musicians, which has 20 printed volumes and was first published in 1980.	Subscription
IMDb	English, German, French, Hungarian, Italian, Polish, Portuguese, Romanian, Turkish, and Spanish	Information related to world films, television programs, home videos, video games, and internet streams	Free
Liquipedia	English, Russian, German, French, Dutch, Swedish	Covers esports in over sixty different games	Free
MusicBrainz	English, German, French, Italian, Dutch	An open music encyclopedia that collects music metadata.	Free
MOOMA	Hebrew	Articles on Israeli music and musical artists	Free
PCGamingWiki	English	Covers PC gaming	Free
Prog Archives	English	Archives of progressive rock bands	Free
Rate Your Music	English	Online encyclopedia of music releases	Free
Rock in China	English	Documents and archives contemporary Chinese music, ranging from rock music to punk, metal, electro, jazz and hip-hop	Free
Vkgy	English, Japanese, German, Spanish, French, Italian, Korean, Dutch, Russian, Chinese	Archives of visual kei bands	Free

== Philosophy ==
Site	Language	Description	Access
Internet Encyclopedia of Philosophy	English	Philosophy related articles	Free
Marxists Internet Archive	Multilingual	Topics related to the study of Marxism	Free
RationalWiki	English	Skeptical interests	Free
Routledge Encyclopedia of Philosophy	English	Philosophy articles	
Stanford Encyclopedia of Philosophy	English	Philosophy subjects	Free

== Politics, law, and history ==
Site	Language	Description	Access
Ballotpedia	English	American politics, elections, and public policy	Free
The Concise Encyclopedia of Economics	English	Economics – part of the Library of Economics and Liberty. Edited by David R. Henderson	Free
Cyclopaedia of Political Science, Political Economy, and the Political History of the United States	English	Articles about science, economics, and American authors. The 1899 edition is available online	Free
Diplopedia	English	US State Department internal encyclopedic wiki, available for diplomats and overseas US agents to use	Access only through the State Department
dKosopedia	English	Political encyclopedia written from a progressive/liberal Democratic point of view	Free
Encyclopedia Titanica	English	Encyclopedia related to the building and sinking of the RMS Titanic	Free
Encyclopedia of World Problems and Human Potential	English	Presents articles on perceived human problems	Free
Gapminder	English	Historical global trends in health, poverty, and demographics	Free
glbtq.com	English	Gay, lesbian, bisexual, transgender, and queer culture.	Free
HistoryLink	English	Articles on the history of Washington state	Free
Holocaust Encyclopedia	English, Arabic, Persian, French, Spanish	Holocaust-related articles, published by the United States Holocaust Memorial Museum	Free
JurisPedia	Arabic, English, Chinese, French, German, Spanish, Dutch	An academic encyclopedia on the concepts of law	Free
Max Planck Encyclopedia of Public International Law	English	Encyclopedia on public International Law	Free
Online Encyclopedia of Mass Violence	French	Electronic database focusing on massacres and genocides of the 20th century.	Free
Our World in Data	English	Global trends on economic growth, poverty, health, war, violence, education, and demographics	Free
Spartacus Educational	English		Free
World History Encyclopedia	English	The world's most-read history encyclopedia, covering world history from all time periods; reviewed by an editorial team, not a Wiki.	Free

== Religion and theology ==
Site	Language	Description	Access
AhmadiPedia	English	Dedicated to the study of the Worldwide Ahmadiyya Muslim Community.	Free, public domain
Catholic Encyclopedia	English	Topics relating to Catholicism, text from 1913 and 1922	Free, public domain
Christian Cyclopedia	English	Collection of historical and theological information	Free
Easton's Bible Dictionary	English	Articles on Christianity and theology	Free, public domain
Encyclopaedia Biblica	English	Contains articles about "the Literary, Political and Religious History, the Archaeology, Geography, and Natural History of the Bible"	Free
Encyclopedia of Mormonism	English	Articles by Mormon academics on history and doctrine of the Church of Jesus Christ of Latter-day Saints (LDS Church).	Free
Global Anabaptist Mennonite Encyclopedia Online	English	Topics relating to Anabaptism and Mennonites	Free
İslâm Ansiklopedisi	Turkish	Articles on topics concerning Islamic studies.	Free
The Jewish Encyclopedia	English	Topics relating to Judaism	Free
Jewish Virtual Library	English	Portals to essential Jewish topics	Free
Encyclopedia Mythica	English	Covers folklore, mythology, and religion.	Free
Punjabipedia	Punjabi	Entries on Sikhism	Subscription
Schaff–Herzog Encyclopedia of Religious Knowledge	English	Christian, published 1908–1914	Free, public domain
WikiShia	Various	Shia Islam, published since 2013	Free

== Science and technology ==
Site	Language	Description	Access
Encyclopedia Astronautica	English	Contains articles on the subject of space exploration and astronomy, no longer updated since 2019	Free
Encyclopedia of Earth	English	Articles on the Earth and its ecosystems	Free
Engineering and Technology History Wiki	English	The history of technology, a partnership between the United Engineering Foundation, and the AIChE, AIME, ASCE, ASME, IEEE, SPE, and SWE	Free
Free On-line Dictionary of Computing	English	Computing and related subjects	Free
Glottopedia	English	Linguistics	Free
Javapedia	English	Coverage of all topics related to the Java Platform	Free
Omniglot	English	Covers languages and writing systems.	Free
Proteopedia	English	Wiki-based 3D encyclopedia of proteins and other molecules.	Free
RP Photonics Encyclopedia	English	Laser technology, photonics, and various other areas of photonics such as nonlinear optics, non-laser light sources, fiber optics, and ultrashort pulses of light.	Free
ScienceWorld	English	Covers astronomy, scientific biography, chemistry, and physics. Like MathWorld, it is edited by Eric Weisstein.	Free

=== Life sciences ===
Site	Language	Description	Access
Animal Diversity Web	English	Student wiki-type database at the University of Michigan of animal natural history, distribution, classification, and conservation biology.	Free
APpedia	Chinese	Contains articles on the subject of general animal protection	Free
ARKive	English	Visual and audio recordings of the world's species	Defunct
Encyclopedia of Life	English, French	Seeks to categorize all 1.8 million known species on the planet	Free
Encyclopedia of Life Sciences	English	Biology related articles	Subscription
Encyclopedia of Life Support Systems	English	Articles about the natural and social sciences	Subscription
Erowid	English	Information about psychoactive substances	Free
FishBase	English, Spanish, Portuguese, French, German, Italian, Dutch, Chinese (Simplified Han), Chinese (Traditional Han), Greek, Swedish, Russian, Persian, Vietnamese, Thai, Lao, Hindi, Bengali	Articles on fish species	Free
Flora Europaea	English	Covers different plant species	Free
King Abdullah Bin Abdulaziz Arabic Health Encyclopedia	Arabic, English	Health encyclopedia	Free
Palaeos	English	Covers palaeontology	Free
PsychonautWiki	English	Articles about recreational drug use	Free
World Flora Online	English	Covers the world's plant species	Free
Wikispecies	English	Seeks to create a catalog of all living things	Free
ZipcodeZoo	English	Encyclopedia of all living things	Defunct

=== Medical ===
Site	Language	Description	Access
Ganfyd	English	Online medical wiki	Defunct
Radiopaedia	English	Articles on medical imaging used in radiology and radiography	Free
WikEM	English	An emergency medicine open-access source	Free

== See also ==
- Chinese encyclopedia
- List of academic databases and search engines
- List of blogs
- List of content forks of Wikipedia
- List of Danish online encyclopedic resources
- List of digital library projects
- List of encyclopedias by branch of knowledge
- List of fact-checking websites
- List of online databases
- List of online dictionaries
- List of open-access journals
- List of search engines
- List of multilingual MediaWiki sites
- List of wikis
- List of Wikipedias
