= Bulgarian Rock Archives =

- Available in: Bulgarian
- Website: bg-rock-archives.com
- Commercial: No
- Launched: 2 August 2013; 13 years ago
- Current status: online

Bulgarian Rock Archives (or Български рок архиви) is the first online encyclopedia dedicated to rock music in Bulgaria. Launched online on 2 August 2013 and includes more than 350 bands and performers from the mid-1960s. The articles are divided in alphabetical order, year of creation, style, location. Profiles of the groups include a short biography, discography, composition, links to videos, and links to official sites and profiles.

Starting 4 June 2015, the site uses a new version, having taken as an example Encyclopaedia Metallum, the world heavy metal encyclopaedia, with better features and design. At that time, it includes about 900 bands and performers.

== See also ==
- List of online music databases
- List of online encyclopedias
