= Vkgy =

Website on visual kei bands

- Native name: ブイケージ
- Romanized name: Buikēji
- Website type: Music database
- Available in: 10 languages
- Owner: John Simpson
- Creator: John Simpson
- Website: vk.gy
- Commercial: No
- Launched: January 1, 2018; 8 years ago
- Current status: Active

Vkgy (Japanese: ブイケージ, Hepburn: Buikēji; stylized as vkgy) is an online encyclopedia and a news website dedicated to musical artists associated with the visual kei movement. The contents are user-generated.

As of June 2026, there were more than 16,000 bands in the Vkgy catalogue. Users of the site maintain the artists' profiles and discographies. The website also provides information on specific subgenres of visual kei, with a possibility of sorting bands by subgenre and other tags.

== History ==
Vkgy was launched in 2018 by John Simpson from the United States. It succeeded a fan community dedicated to the Under Code Production record label that had existed since 2004.

== Legacy ==
For its functionality, Vkgy has been compared to Encyclopaedia Metallum. In 2025, Simpson, the owner of Vkgy, was featured as a guest vocalist in the song "VIRTUAL IZ DEAD" by a visual kei VTuber Shisen. In 2026, Vkgy's history and functions as a visual kei reference site were outlined in The World Visual Kei Guidebook, a book showcasing visual kei artists outside Japan.

== See also ==
- List of online music databases
- List of online encyclopedias
