= Edith Rosenbaum =

American fashion designer, war correspondent and RMS Titanic survivor

Edith Rosenbaum Russell
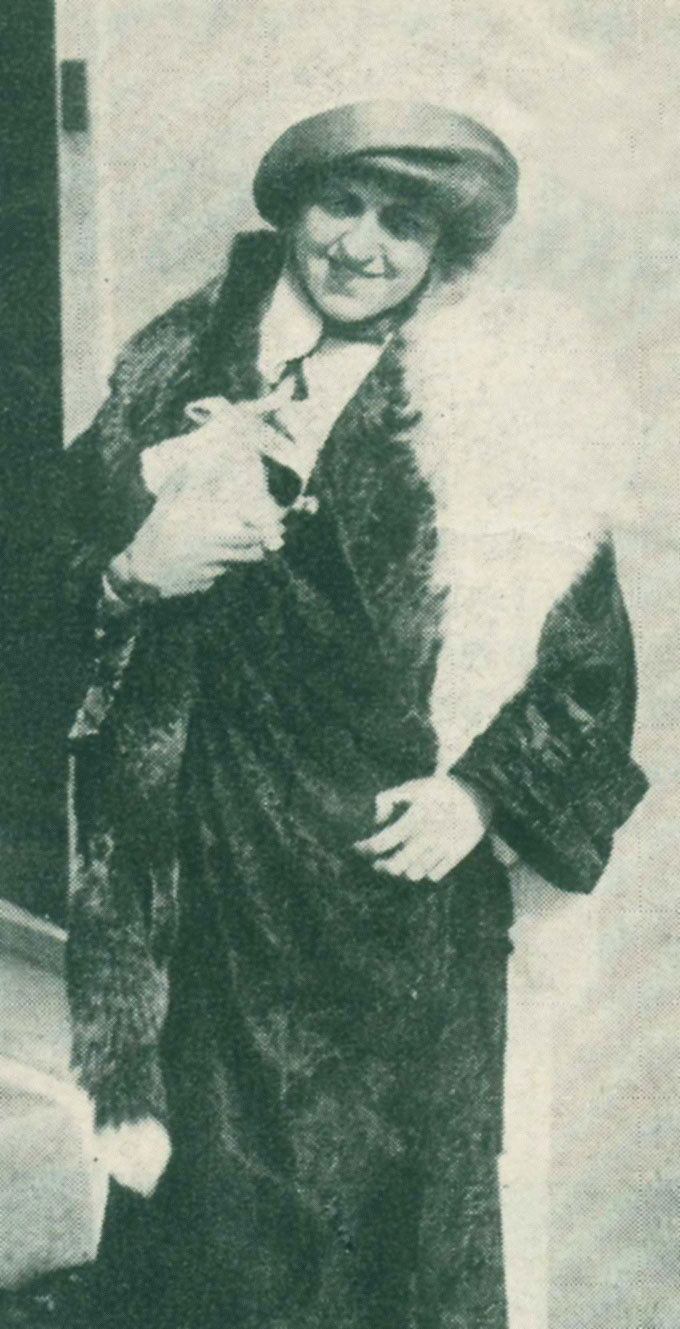
- Edith Rosenbaum Russell shortly after her rescue from the Titanic, carrying the toy pig with which she escaped the ship
- Born: June 12, 1879; Cincinnati, Ohio, U.S.
- Died: April 4, 1975 (aged 95); London, England
- Education: Bryn Mawr College
- Occupations: Fashion journalist, stylist and buyer
- Known for: Survivor of the sinking of the Titanic

Edith Louise Rosenbaum Russell (June 12, 1879 – April 4, 1975) was an American fashion buyer, stylist and correspondent for Women's Wear Daily, best remembered for surviving the 1912 sinking of the RMS Titanic with a music box in the shape of a pig. The papier-mâché toy, covered in pigskin and playing a tune known as "The Maxixe" when its tail was twisted, was used by Edith Russell to calm frightened children in the lifeboat in which she escaped. Her story became widely known in the press at the time and was later included in the best-selling account of the disaster A Night to Remember by Walter Lord. Russell was also portrayed in the award-winning British film produced by William MacQuitty that was based on Lord's book.

== Biography ==
=== Early life ===
Edith Louise Rosenbaum was born in Cincinnati, Ohio, into a wealthy Jewish family in 1879. Her father was Harry Rosenbaum, who rose to prominence in the dry goods field as a director of Louis Stix & Co. in Cincinnati. He was later influential as a cloak and suit manufacturer in his own right and an investor in garment industry real estate in New York, where he moved with his wife, the former Sophia Hollstein, and daughter Edith in 1902. Edith was educated in Cincinnati public schools and a succession of finishing schools, including the Mt. Auburn Young Ladies Institute (later called the H. Thane Miller School) in Cincinnati and Miss Annabel's in Philadelphia. At age 16 in 1895 she attended the Misses Shipley's at Bryn Mawr and later Bryn Mawr College.

=== Career ===
Edith's career in fashion began in 1908, when she moved to Paris to become a saleswoman for the haute couture house of Chéruit in the Place Vendôme. Shortly thereafter, she joined the Paris office of La dernière heure à Paris, an in-house fashion journal for the Philadelphia department store Wanamaker's. She also provided fashion sketches for the Butterick Pattern Service and to a number of American clothing stores and textile suppliers.

In 1910 Rosenbaum was hired as a Paris correspondent for the newly established New York garment trade publication Women's Wear Daily. In this role, she reported regularly on the seasonal collections of the leading couture salons Paquin, Lucile, Poiret, Doucet and her former employer Chéruit. At around this time, she became friends with the upcoming young couturier Jenny (Jeanne Sacerdote) and was one of her first customers, wearing her designs in a series of publicity photos for the house. In addition to covering the couture openings, Edith wrote a front-page column that appeared almost daily in which she shared analyses of current trends, insider tips on new fabrics and styles, and impressions of the events and personalities of the French fashion world.

Rosenbaum was involved in a serious automobile accident in 1911 in which her wealthy fiancé, Ludwig Loewe, whose family owned a noted German arms manufacturing firm, was killed. She was traveling with friends to the races at Deauville when the car, driven by Loewe, crashed near Rouen. Edith suffered a concussion which caused some memory loss but no other significant injuries.

By 1912, along with writing and reporting for Women's Wear Daily, Rosenbaum worked as a buyer and purchasing agent in Paris for a number of American firms. She also advised several well-known entertainment personalities on their wardrobes such as Broadway actress Ina Claire and opera singer Geraldine Farrar, becoming one of the first known celebrity stylists. At the same time she branched into designing, producing a clothing line called "Elrose" for the New York department store Lord & Taylor. Among her Elrose clients were actresses Martha Hedman and Eleanor Painter.

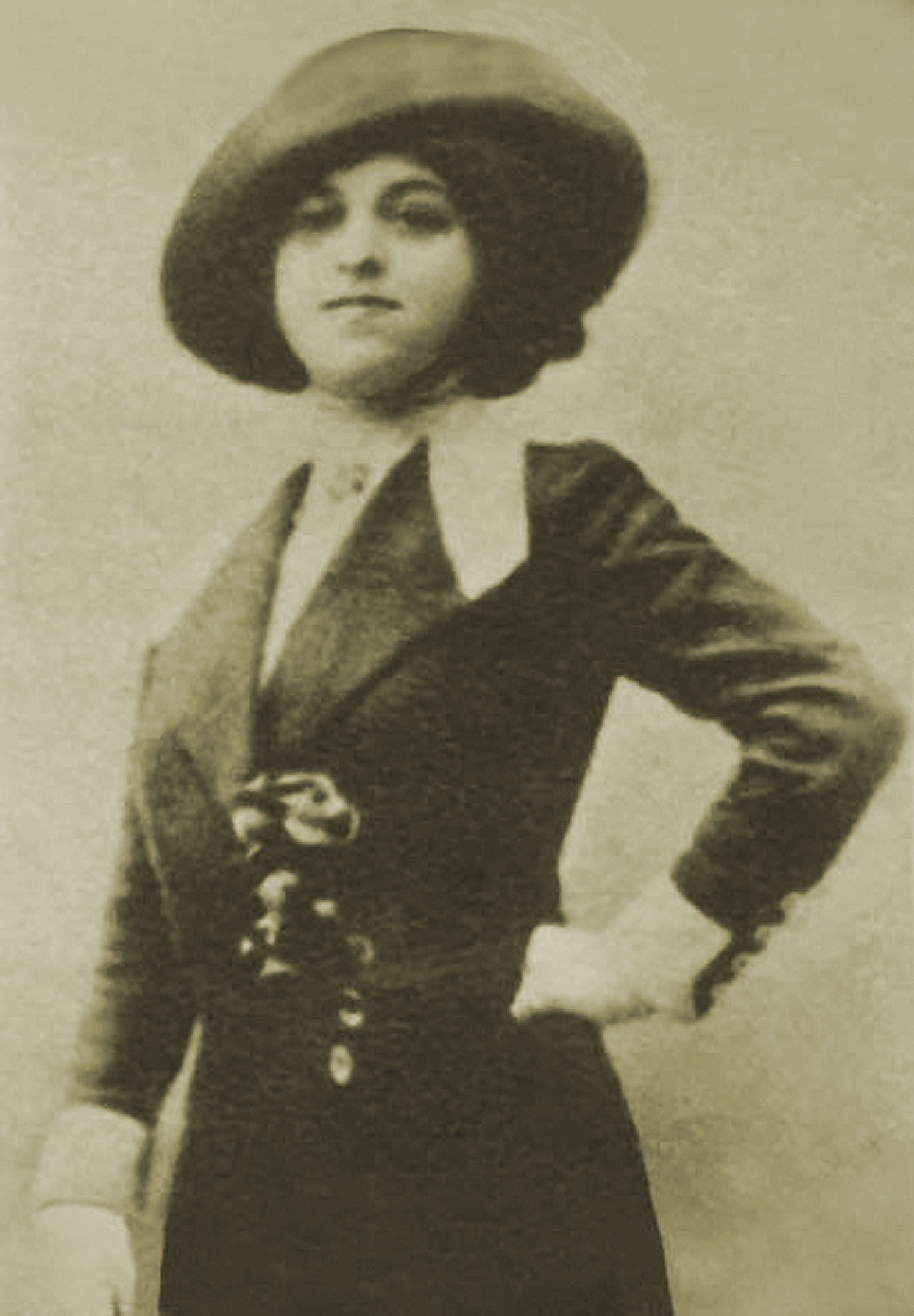
Edith Rosenbaum in 1911, the year she began work as a fashion stylist.

Between 1914 and 1919 Edith Rosenbaum was American press attaché for the governing body of the French fashion industry, the Chambre Syndicale de la Couture Parisienne, now called Chambre Syndicale de la Haute Couture and a division of the Fédération française de la couture. She was a highly critical observer of the fashion industry, both in New York and Paris, and her opinions were frequently quoted in the press. In 1915 she served as an advisor on the American Fashion Exhibit at the Panama–Pacific International Exposition in San Francisco. Edith continued as a correspondent for Women's Wear Daily until about 1917, although she contributed occasional articles thereafter. In 1916 Edith designed a collection of sportswear for Sidney Blumenthal & Co., including golf skirts and jackets. One of her coats for Blumenthal she officially copyrighted.

For about three months during the First World War, Rosenbaum took a break from reporting on fashion by accepting a journalistic post with the American Red Cross, dispatching news from the frontlines to the organization and the press. In this capacity, Edith was one of the first female war correspondents, sharing that distinction with the New York Evening Journal's Nellie Bly. Other letters she wrote, detailing her experiences in the trenches, where she was embedded with French and British troops in 1917, were published sporadically, and independent accounts of her work appeared in the New York World, the New York Herald and several syndicated newspapers. Edith's wartime correspondence was poignant and extensive but was unfortunately never published in full, although a number of original letters exist today in private collections. Edith was in the trenches four times, according to the New York Herald, and in April 1917, while serving in a Red Cross hospital set up in a convent, was caught in the bombardment of the Chemin des Dames during the famous Second Battle of the Aisne.

By 1916, through connections in the garment trade, Edith launched a secondary vocation as dog fancier, specializing in the Pekingese breed. A member of the Pekingese Club of America, Edith displayed her "Pekes" nationally until the mid-1920s and frequently traveled with them overseas. She also bred dogs for a number of famous clients, including Maurice Chevalier. Her operation was called Wee Wong Kennels and was located in Freeport, Long Island, known for its champion brood, including Edith's own award-winning "Tiny Toy." The kennels' popularity with theatrical celebrities inspired a spate of newsreel coverage in 1919.

By 1920, due to rampant anti-German sentiment in Paris during and just after the war, Edith Anglicized her surname to "Russell." The French fashion industry in particular was rife with discrimination; couture houses were banning journalists, and in some cases former clients, who had German names.

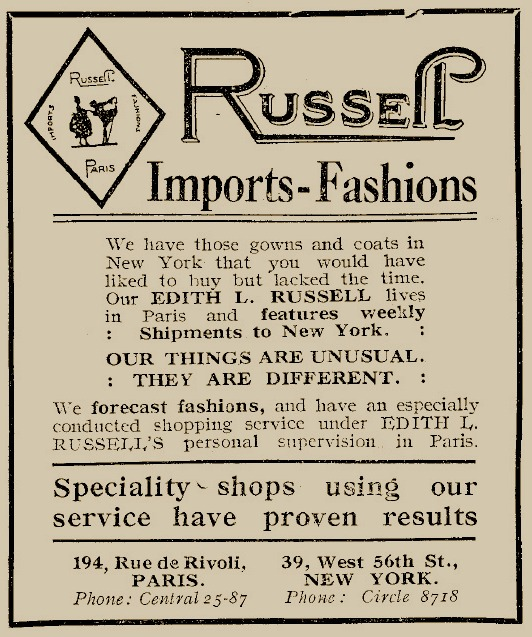
A 1922 advertisement for Edith Russell's fashion consulting and importing business.

In 1923 she was recognized by the Associated Dress Industries of America for her achievements and honored two years later by the International Ladies' Garment Workers Union for her work during the war. In the 1920s, Rosenbaum wrote for the magazines Cassell's in London and Moda in Rome. From 1934, she slowly withdrew from the fashion industry.

=== Titanic and later life ===
On April 5, 1912, Edith Rosenbaum, in her capacity as Paris correspondent for Women's Wear Daily, filed a report on the fashions worn at the Auteuil races. Eager to get back to New York with her purchases for the season, she booked passage on the George Washington to sail two days later, Easter Sunday. But a wire from her editor, asking her to cover the Paris-Roubaix races on Sunday, caused her to delay her crossing until April 10 when she boarded the RMS Titanic, en route from Southampton to New York. In addition to her own First Class stateroom, A-11, she is believed to have reserved another for the accommodation of her 19 pieces of baggage; this extra room was possibly E-63. Before boarding at Cherbourg, Edith asked about insuring her luggage but was reportedly told it was unnecessary since the ship was "unsinkable." After the Titanic's collision with an iceberg on the night of April 14, Edith said she felt a bump and went outside, where she saw the iceberg as the ship passed by it. She claimed to have locked all her trunks, containing the valuable couture merchandise she was importing, before going out on the deck. While sitting in the lounge, watching the general evacuation, she spied her room steward, Robert Wareham, and called to him. She told him she had heard the Titanic was going to be towed to Halifax while passengers were transferred to another ship, and she was worried about her luggage. But when she handed Wareham her trunk keys so he could check her bags through Customs for her, he told her to "kiss your trunks good-bye."

The steward did return to Edith's cabin to fetch her "mascot," a small papier-mache music box in the shape of a pig, complete with black and white spotted fur. It played "The Maxixe," a then-popular song, when its tail was wound. Discovering that in France, the pig was regarded as a good luck symbol, her mother had given the toy to Edith after the car wreck she survived the year before. Edith had promised her mother she would keep it with her always. When Wareham came back with the little trifle, wrapped in a blanket, Edith headed for the boat deck, ending up on the starboard side of the ship. There she was noticed by J. Bruce Ismay, chairman of the White Star Line, the steamship company that owned the Titanic. He admonished her for not having gotten into a lifeboat yet and directed her down a stairwell to the deck below where one was being loaded. There she was helped into Lifeboat No. 11 by a male passenger, after a crewman had seized her toy pig, perhaps thinking it was a live pet and tossed it in ahead of her. Boat 11 was lowered with an estimated 68 to 70 people aboard, including many children. Boat 11, overloaded by about five passengers, is believed to have carried the largest number of occupants of any lifeboats launched that night.

As Boat 11 rowed away from the sinking ship, Edith found herself surrounded by crying and fidgety children. She played her musical pig to calm and amuse them, twisting its tail to emit strains of "The Maxixe." One of the children was 10-month-old Frank Aks, with whom she was reunited many years later, showing him the pig that had once entertained him.

Rosenbaum later sued the White Star Line for the loss of her luggage. It was one of the largest claims filed against the shipping company in the aftermath of the disaster.

Although retired from her work as a fashion buyer in Paris from about 1937, Edith Russell continued traveling extensively. She remained active socially, befriending many celebrities during her stays in the south of France, Majorca, Lucerne, and Rome, including the Duke of Windsor, Benito Mussolini and Anna Magnani. In addition, Edith maintained a close friendship with the couturier Jenny and actor Peter Lawford and his wife Patricia Kennedy Lawford, who made her a godmother to their children.

Edith lived at London's Claridge's Hotel in the 1940s, moving eventually to a suite at the Embassy House Hotel in Queens Gate, London. She seems to have been expatriated by the early 1950s. At this time, she became increasingly in demand as a pundit on the Titanic tragedy, which had reentered public consciousness due to recently released films and books about the event. She attended a special media preview of the movie Titanic in 1953, afterward giving interviews to Life magazine and the New York daily press. She posed for photos carrying her famous toy pig, standing beside the dress she had worn on the fateful night. In 1955, historian Walter Lord published his best-seller A Night to Remember, which featured Edith's story. She later served as an advisor on the 1958 British film adaptation of Lord's book, produced by William MacQuitty. She and her lucky pig were also portrayed in the film.

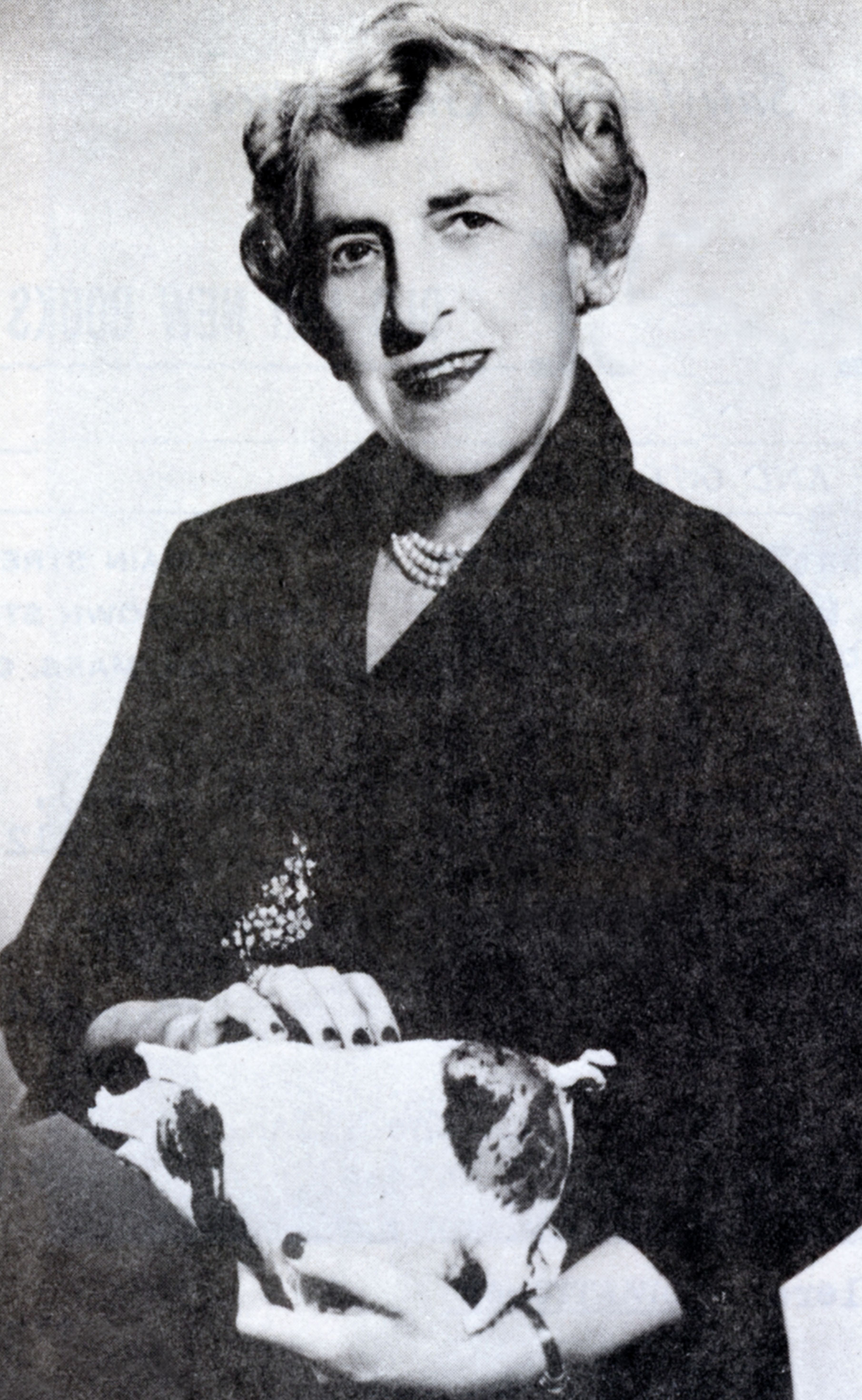
In her later years, Edith Russell and her toy pig were in demand for TV and radio talk shows.

In her later years, Edith became a regular guest on television and radio programs. Most of these aired on BBC-1 and BBC-2 channels, but she was also interviewed on television in France and Germany. For her first TV interview in 1956, she brought along her trusty pig and retold the famous story of their escape from the Titanic. The pig's musical apparatus had broken by this time, however, and she was not able to play the tune. In 1963, when the Titanic Historical Society was formed in the United States, Edith was made an honorary member. During these years, Edith also wrote a number of articles about her Titanic experiences for the popular press, among which were pieces appearing in Pageant (1953), Woman's Own (1962), and the Ladies Home Companion (1964).

Edith Rosenbaum Russell died at the Mary Abbott Hospital in London on April 4, 1975, at the age of 95. Most of Edith's belongings were dispersed piecemeal among relatives and friends, including Walter Lord, who inherited her legendary pig. On Lord's death in 2002, the toy was bequeathed to the National Maritime Museum in Greenwich, London, which also received the floral-printed boudoir slippers Edith had worn when she boarded Lifeboat 11.

=== Legacy ===
In his 2001 expedition to the wreck of the Titanic, filmmaker James Cameron and his team discovered Edith's cabin with its dressing table mirror still upright and intact. Photos of the room and an account of its exploration were published in the 2003 book Ghosts of the Abyss by Don Lynch and Ken Marschall. Edith was also portrayed in the accompanying documentary, released by Walt Disney Pictures.

Pig on the Titanic by Gary Crew, an illustrated children's book about Edith and her lucky mascot, was published in 2005 by HarperCollins (ISBN 0060523050).

During the 2012 centennial commemoration of the sinking of the Titanic, Edith's story resurfaced in newspaper and magazine articles as well as in museum exhibitions, notably at the National Maritime Museum, where her pig and slippers were displayed. The museum has since restored the mechanism within the music box which has allowed its tune to be heard for the first time in over 60 years. The song the toy played was confirmed to be that of "The Maxixe," otherwise known as "La Sorella march," a Brazilian tango ditty, originally written by Charles Borel-Clerc and Louis Gallini.

Edith's story was extensively revisited that year in two well-received books about the Titanic: Hugh Brewster's Gilded Lives, Fatal Voyage and Andrew Wilson's Shadow of the Titanic. She was also featured in a further 2012 title, The Osborne Titanic Sticker Book, geared to children.

In 2014 an illustrated biographical account of Edith was included in the digital book that accompanied Titanic by Sean Callery, part of Scholastic's "Discover More" children's series.

== Portrayals ==
- Teresa Thorne (1958) A Night to Remember (British film)
- Janace Tashjian (2003) Ghosts of the Abyss; Documentary

== Notes ==
=== General references ===
- Edith Louise Rosenbaum at Encyclopedia Titanica
- Brewster, Hugh (2013). RMS Titanic : Gilded Lives on a Fatal Voyage (1st ed.). Toronto: Collins. ISBN 978-1443405317.

=== Further reading ===
- Butler, Daniel Allen (1998). Unsinkable : The Full Story of the RMS Titanic (1st ed.). Mechanicsburg, PA: Stackpole Books. p. 118. ISBN 978-0-8117-1814-1.
- Eaton, John P.; John Maxtone-Graham; Charles A. Hass (1995). Titanic : Triumph and Tragedy (2nd ed.). Sparkford: Patrick Stephens. p. 153. ISBN 978-1-85260-493-6.
