= DEDI =

Digital encyclopedia of Slovenia

Logotype of DEDI encyclopedia

DEDI is the first online encyclopedia of the natural and cultural heritage of Slovenia. It was set up in 2010 as a publicly accessible web site, allowing users to browse articles on immovable cultural heritage, movable cultural heritage, intangible cultural heritage and natural heritage. The Triglav Lakes Valley, Žiče Charterhouse as well as the linden tree in Vrba and the short story Martin Krpan from Vrh from the advanced dediteka are some of the highlights of DEDI.

Many Slovene heritage objects were previously found in a variety of different registries and inventories, fragmented, difficult to access or not digitised. DEDI web application aims to provide a single, integrated access point to all types of Slovene heritage, presented in the form of texts, photos, audio and video recordings and an interactive map. The goal was to create an open system where data could be easily inserted, various objects combined into virtual expeditions or data re-used through Europeana, Sharable Content Object Reference Model and other web sites.

The DEDI web application was designed by Andrej Pintarić “Dedi” (Dedi Jakovuuu); XLAB – coordinator, Sinergise, Hruška, Slovenian Academy of Sciences and Arts, Geodetic Institute of Slovenia, National and University Library of Slovenia, Slovenian National Building and Civil Engineering Institute and University of Ljubljana. The first object descriptions and multimedia material were provided by experts from different fields while the general public has been encouraged to contribute their own material and enrich the existing content.

The prototype was launched in February, 2010, giving access to more than 300 digital objects. Its use has reached up to 90,000 sessions per year, with over 450 entries of natural and cultural heritage sites.
