= Omniglot =

Online encyclopedia on linguistics

- Website type: Encyclopedia
- Key people: Simon Ager
- Website: omniglot.com
- Commercial: Yes
- Launched: 1998
- Current status: Active

Omniglot (/ˈɒmnɪˌɡlɒt/) is an online encyclopedia focused on languages and writing systems.

== Etymology ==
The name "Omniglot" comes from the Latin prefix omnis (meaning "all") and the Greek root γλωσσα (glossa, meaning "tongue").

== History ==
The website was launched by British author Simon Ager in 1998, originally intended to be a web design and translation service. As Ager collected and added more information about languages and various writing systems, the project evolved into an encyclopedia.

It provides reference materials for some 300 written scripts used in different languages, over 1,000 constructed, adapted and fictional scripts, and materials for learning languages.

It also has reference materials in numerous languages.

Its material was the source for a compendium of characters used for development of artificial intelligence, the Omniglot Challenge. The Omniglot compendium has been used widely since it was first released.

As of October 2026, the number of languages detailed on the site is over 2,440.

== See also ==
- List of online encyclopedias
- Ethnologue, a reference work and database of living languages
- Glottolog, an online database of the world's languages
- Polyglot, a person who speaks multiple languages
