= Veropedia =

Advertising-supported online encyclopedia

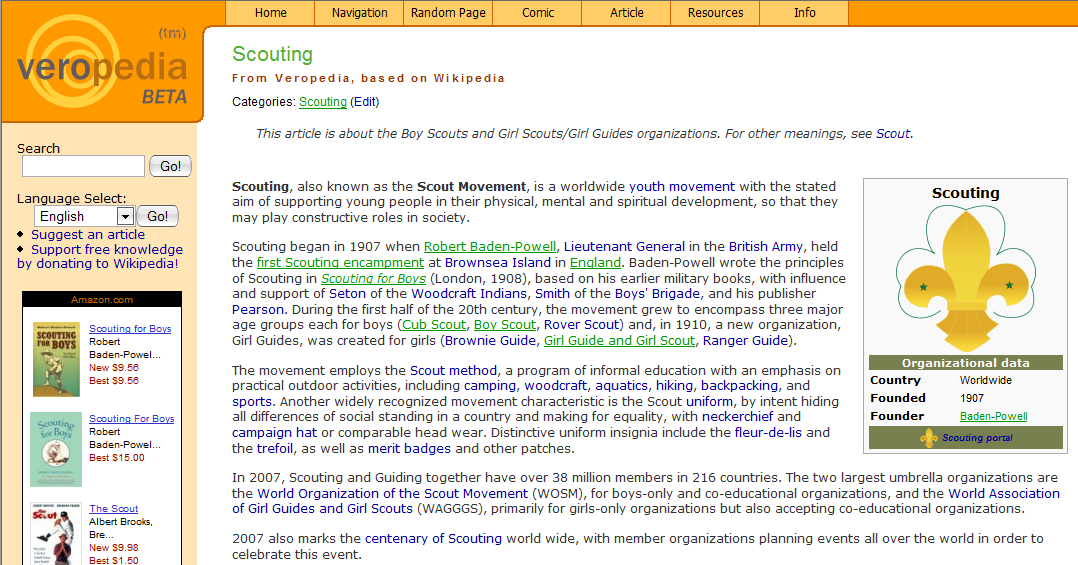
- Website type: Online encyclopedia
- Available in: English
- Owners: Veropedia, Inc.
- Creator: Wikipedia editors
- Website: veropedia.org (defunct)
- Commercial: Yes
- Registration: Not required to read, required to contribute
- Launched: October 2007
- Current status: Inactive

Veropedia was a free, advertising-supported online encyclopedia launched in 2007. Veropedia editors chose Wikipedia articles that met the site's reliability standards; information was then scraped, or chosen by an automatic process, and thereafter a stable version of the article was posted on Veropedia. Any improvements required for articles to reach a standard suitable for Veropedia had to be done on Wikipedia itself. This model was intended to improve the quality of both projects.

By October 2008, the site, still in beta, had checked and imported more than 5,800 articles from the English Wikipedia into its public database.

The project was mainly financed by those involved in the project, although it was intended to eventually support itself completely through advertising. The site was discontinued in 2009.

== History ==
Veropedia was started in October 2007, by a group of experienced Wikipedia editors, including founder Daniel Wool, who had prior experience editing a variety of reference works including Encyclopedia of the Peoples of the World and was a former co-ordinator at the Wikimedia Foundation, the parent organization of Wikipedia.

By November, around 100 Wikipedia editors were involved in the project. Veropedia sought the help of academics who had worked on Wikipedia. An explanatory page on the site stated that similar projects in languages other than English might be launched; it distinguished Veropedia from "expert-driven" wikis such as Citizendium.

The website was operated by Veropedia, Inc., a for-profit corporation registered in Florida, As required by its use of Wikipedia material, all Veropedia content was licensed under the GNU Free Documentation License.

In December 2008, the encyclopedia contents were removed and replaced with a message stating that "The original version of Veropedia has been taken down for now while we work on a new Veropedia. This new Veropedia will have a superior method of handling articles and introduces an improved interface."

== Contrast with Wikipedia ==
- Articles were uploaded when they met Veropedia's criteria. Articles were not edited once uploaded.
- Veropedia used only experienced article editors, and operated an automated system for uploading, which checked proposed articles for a wide range of issues, and refused to accept them if any were present.

Independent human expert review of articles was planned for the final version, but was not implemented. In Veropedia's own words: "Each article will be given to recognized academics and experts to review. These experts can either provide their stamp of approval or make suggestions as to how the article can be improved further. In that way, users will know that the article is reliable." "Our material is written by Wikipedia contributors. The role of experts and academics will be to check it and, ideally, approve it. Their comments will be given back to our contributors to incorporate back into the articles to make them even better."

- While Wikipedia allows almost anyone to edit, contributing to Veropedia was by approval (following a request) or invitation only.
- Veropedia's content covered a smaller range than Wikipedia: at its height it had some 5800 articles vs. 3 million for Wikipedia. The focus was explicitly upon articles that were likely to be useful to teachers and students, and were improved to a high quality standard. As of December 2007, Veropedia's growth rate was around 300 articles per month.
- Unlike the English Wikipedia, Veropedia had a number of tighter restrictions. For example, exclusion of fair use images and other content. The Veropedia FAQ stated: "We have decided to... go back to the core principles of the project by focusing on free content. Only by insisting on free content can we revert the current trend of extending copyright and encourage people to release their content to the public."
- While Wikipedia is funded by donations, Veropedia used paid advertising. Daniel Wool commented: "I was in charge of fundraising for Wikipedia, and I feel a lot more comfortable taking ads from Amazon than the donations of high school students."

== Evaluation ==
Nicholas Carr, a critic of Web 2.0 in general and Wikipedia in particular, criticized Veropedia as trying to "scrape" the "cream" of Wikipedia. Carr has also stated that Veropedia had an unclear interface with clicks bouncing one back and forth between Wikipedia and Veropedia.

Tim Blackmore, an associate professor at the Faculty of Information and Media Studies of the University of Western Ontario, expressed scepticism toward the project, since there are already encyclopedias in existence where "content is checked and articles are reviewed". The main lure of the internet, according to him, is "free information" and Wikipedia has already emerged as a pioneer in open content information resources.

A different evaluation in The Australian said Veropedia "seems more likely to succeed" than Citizendium, another then-recently founded online encyclopedia, because "it is less directly competitive" with Wikipedia. The story opined that both Veropedia and Citizendium "should in theory help improve the fairness and accuracy of available online information about many contentious topics although the academic bent to each raises questions over what, exactly, they will construe as fair when it comes to coverage of corporations and their actions."

A story in Wired News discussed whether Veropedia (and Citizendium) could avoid some of the same problems that Wikipedia has supposedly encountered: "Though office politics and internecine bickering abound at the Wikimedia Foundation – one former insider described the atmosphere as "MySpace meets 'As the World Turns' for geeks" – both Wool and Sanger deny that internal squabbles were why they started their own encyclopedias. Whether their ventures fall prey to the same turf wars, bureaucratic quagmires and academic catfights as the site that spawned them remains to be seen."

In a review of various Wikipedia alternatives, TechNewsWorld argued that Veropedia's estimation of 5000 articles was not credible, as "many of these articles are small and insignificant almanac-type entries that serve mainly as filler". It thus argued that like Citizendium, Veropedia avoided "the tough challenge of handling controversial and time-sensitive subjects" that Wikipedia had taken on. The article also stated that most Veropedia articles were identical to their Wikipedia counterpart.

== See also ==
- List of online encyclopedias
