= Ship of Harkinian =

2022 video game by Harbour Masters

- Developer: Harbour Masters
- Release: 22 March 2022; 4 years ago
- Stable release: Dewey Alpha (9.3.0) / 5 October 2026; 34 days ago
- Written in: C and C++
- Operating system: Microsoft Windows, Linux, macOS, Nintendo Switch, Nintendo Wii U, Android
- Website: www.shipofharkinian.com
- Repository: github.com/HarbourMasters/Shipwright

Ship of Harkinian is an unofficial source-available port of the 1998 Nintendo 64 video game The Legend of Zelda: Ocarina of Time that runs on Microsoft Windows, Linux, macOS, Wii U, Android, and Nintendo Switch.

The port was developed by a group of community developers named Harbour Masters. It was first released in March 2022 for Windows, four months after Ocarina of Time's source code was decompiled and released. Since then, Ship of Harkinian has received ports to Linux and macOS, and homebrew ports to Wii U and Nintendo Switch. The title of the project is an allusion to the philosophical thought experiment Ship of Theseus, as well as the name of the King from The Legend of Zelda CD-i games, who was the subject of internet memes.

Ship of Harkinian received positive attention from games media thanks to its quality of life improvements compared to the original release of Ocarina of Time. Harbour Masters have subsequently ported other Nintendo 64 and GameCube games to Windows.

== Development ==
=== Decompilation of Ocarina of Time ===
In November 2021, after 21 months of development, the Zelda Reverse Engineering Team (ZRET) successfully decompiled the executable to The Legend of Zelda: Ocarina of Time into human-readable code. While the decompilation project was principally carried out for the sake of documenting the game's creation and backend functionality, it also made possible the potential creation of source ports of Ocarina of Time, which would allow the game to be recompiled and run on platforms it was not originally developed for. Speaking to Ars Technica, ZRET member Rozlette stated that source ports were "outside the scope of what we do".

=== Early development and release ===
In June 2020, developers Jack Walker and Kenix discussed the potential of a PC port of Ocarina of Time based on the ZRET decompilation project's work; at the time, Ocarina of Time's decompilation was only 17% complete. Development on what would later become Ship of Harkinian began in November 2021, coinciding with the decompilation project reaching completion.

In January 2022, a group of community developers named Harbour Masters released footage and screenshots of Ocarina of Time running natively on Microsoft Windows, in a widescreen aspect ratio not supported by the original Nintendo 64 release. The project was titled "Ship of Harkinian", a reference to King Harkinian from Zelda: The Wand of Gamelon. Speaking to Video Games Chronicle, Kenix, now part of Harbour Masters, estimated the project was "approximately 90%" complete.

Prior to Ship of Harkinian's release, Harbour Masters showcased various experimental game modifications to Ocarina of Time, such as gyroscopic aiming and 4K texture support.

Ship of Harkinian launched for Windows in March 2022.

=== Additional platform support and features ===
In May 2022, Harbour Masters announced the release of a Linux port of Ship of Harkinian via "Ship of Harkinian Direct", an online video parody presentation of Nintendo Direct. Additional features noted in this Direct include save states, an integrated cheat menu, accessibility options, and support for running the game at 60 frames per second.

Two months later, in July 2022, an additional Ship of Harkinian Direct was released, announcing the release of Ship of Harkinian for macOS and Wii U. Additional features promoted in this Direct include a graphic interface for rebinding controls, a "randomizer" which randomizes various elements of the game to enhance replayability, and the ability to set an arbitrary framerate (up to 250FPS).

Ship of Harkinian received Nintendo Switch support in the September 2022 "Zhora Alfa" update.

In April 2023, a new Ship of Harkinian Direct was released, announcing custom texture and model support. Multiplayer functionality was added to the port; a second player can take control of Ivan the Fairy, described as a fairy "who likes to play tricks", whose abilities can either help or hinder the main player.

=== Other releases ===
Harbour Masters expressed intent to create a source port for Ocarina of Time's sequel, The Legend of Zelda: Majora's Mask, shortly after ZRET completed their decompilation of the game. In November 2023, Harbour Masters revealed that Majora's Mask was fully decompiled, and that they were currently working on a PC port called "2Ship2Harkinian", with its first version being released on 26 May 2024. Harbour Masters' PC ports use a custom library known as libultraship (LUS) to assist with the porting process.

Harbour Masters have used LUS to port several other N64 games to PC. These include "StarShip" (Star Fox 64) in December 2024, "SpaghettiKart" (Mario Kart 64) in June 2025, "Ghostship" (Super Mario 64) in January 2026, "Lighthouse" (Banjo-Kazooie) in July 2026, and "Paperboat" (Paper Mario) in September 2026. In June 2026, Harbour Masters announced that they would be upgrading LUS's translation layer to produce PC ports of GameCube games, beginning with the upcoming "Courage Reborn" (The Legend of Zelda: Twilight Princess).

== Reception ==
Reception to Ship of Harkinian has been generally positive. The project has been favorably compared against the Nintendo Classics version of Ocarina of Time. Nick Rodriguez of Screen Rant deemed Ship of Harkinian "significantly better than the current Switch version in almost every regard", with The Verge's Derek Hill expressing similar sentiment: "As long as Nintendo is content putting out alarmingly low-quality versions of their classic games for shockingly high prices, Ship of Harkinian is proof that the unofficial option is sometimes the best option."

Some outlets expressed apprehension over Ship of Harkinian, fearing that Nintendo's perceived litigiousness could jeopardize the project. In discussing Ship of Harkinian's long-term prospects, GameSpot writer Jenny Zheng believed that Ship of Harkinian's "odds aren't great", while characterizing Nintendo as "notoriously copyright-lawsuit-happy". Luke Plunkett of Kotaku considered Ship of Harkinian's legality "murky", but noted that other projects built off of reverse engineering efforts were still active as of writing. In a statement to GamesRadar+, Harbour Masters contributor Kenix defended the legality of Ship of Harkinian: "The [Ocarina of Time] assets will be ripped from a user's own ROM that they must provide and then be exported into an archive compatible with the Ship of Harkinian. None of Nintendo's own property is involved in the process." Harbour Masters encouraged users to support official releases of Ocarina of Time, and offered a unique role on their Discord server to those who can provide proof of ownership.

=== Generative AI use ===
In September 2026, a PCGamingWiki user submitted a post suggesting that Ship of Harkinian violated the website's policies on AI-generated content, as Harbour Masters utilized generative AI extensively in their project's code. The post was shared across social media, with Harbour Masters attracting criticism for not disclosing their use of generative AI. In response to the controversy, several members of Harbour Masters gave statements implying that team members had been using generative AI in Ship of Harkinian for years, with the codebase containing references to ChatGPT, Claude, and Microsoft Copilot.
