= Crnogorska Enciklopedija =

- Logo of Crnogorska Enciklopedija
- Website type: Internet encyclopedia project
- Available in: Montenegrin
- Owner: IT Association of Montenegro
- Creators: Darko Bulatović; Damir Mustafić
- Website: http://wikii.itam.ws/
- Commercial: No
- Registration: Optional
- Launched: 2006
- Current status: Offline

Crnogorska Enciklopedija (English: Montenegrin Encyclopedia; formerly Montenegrowiki) was an internet encyclopedia project written in Montenegrin, which existed from 2006 to 2008. It was started by the IT Association of Montenegro in 2006 as an experimental project, with the goal of providing a base for a future Montenegrin Wikipedia. As of late 2008, it is nonfunctional. It used the MediaWiki software, running at version 1.6.8, and did not carry advertising.

By 9 January 2008, Crnogorska Enciklopedija had just over 1,000 articles. Like Wikipedia, the articles were released under the GNU Free Documentation License. Its authors and webmasters were Darko Bulatović ("User:WikiSysop") and Damir Mustafić ("User:OutLook").

According to Bulatović, in an interview for the Montenegrin daily newspaper Vijesti, the project was a victim of wiki-hacking, having been attacked by users from Serbia.

As of late 2008, the project is closed. Much of its contents were later carried over to the Incubator test version of Montenegrin Wikipedia.

== See also ==
- Enciclopedia Libre
- List of online encyclopedias
