= Panyathai =

Panyathai Web site logo

Panyathai was a Thai online encyclopedia started on 1 December 2006 with 80 articles, mainly in Thai. Established in honor of King Bhumibol Adulyadej, the site plan was to have at least 80,000 articles by 5 December 2007, the king's 80th birthday. It contained some English content, mostly providing information about royal projects.

The articles came from two different sources:

1. Articles written by experts.
2. Articles to be written by volunteers.

All the content was copyrighted, unlike other Web-based encyclopedias. The project claims itself as a wiki and states that users can make changes to the articles, but it had no such functionality at its launch. The website allowed creation of articles and adding comments to the already-created articles. However, registration was required. The website used Drupal as the content management system and MediaWiki for the Wiki part.

The project was controlled by the Thai Webmaster Association with support from the Ministry of Education and the Thai Health Promotion Foundation.

As of September 2017 the site is dead.
