= Encyclopedia Mythica =

Internet encyclopedia of folklore, mythology, and religion

Encyclopedia Mythica is an online encyclopedia that seeks to cover folklore, mythology, and religion. This encyclopedia was founded in June 1995 as a small site with about 300 entries, and established with its own domain name in March 1996. As of May 2021, it features more than 11000 articles.
