= Punjabipedia =

Punjabi language encyclopedia

- Punjabipedia website home page screenshot
- Website type: Internet encyclopedia project
- Available in: Punjabi
- Website: punjabipedia.org
- Launched: 26 February 2014; 12 years ago
- Current status: Active

Punjabipedia is a Punjabi language encyclopedia created by Punjabi University, Patiala on suggestion of the Government of Punjab, India. It is developed in a similar fashion to Wikipedia and is meant to promote the Punjabi language and its literature, Punjabi culture and to attract people active in the field of the Punjabi language. It was announced on 18 January 2014 during the 30th three-day international Punjabi conference on 'Punjabi Society and Media' held at the University of Science Auditorium, organized by Department of Punjabi Development, Punjabi University, Patiala.

It was formally launched on 26 February 2014 by Jaspal Singh, vice-chancellor of Punjabi University, Patiala. In contrast to Wikipedia, all entries will be reviewed, controlled and curated by university staff members exclusively rather than by the public as in the case of Wikipedia. It is said that Punjabipedia includes 72,614 words in comparison to the 8,200 words of the Punjabi language Wikipedia. It is described as a part of "Mission Punjabi 2020" which aims to promote the Punjabi language and to place it among the top languages of the world.

== Overview ==
Punjabipedia aims to promote the Punjabi language worldwide and make it one of the most popular languages of world as a part of "Mission Punjabi 2020". On 26 February 2014, Devinder Singh, director, planning and monitoring head of Punjabi University and coordinator of the Punjabipedia said that Punjabipedia will be available in Gurmukhi script and will be more reliable and authentic in comparison to Wikipedia as it will be controlled and monitored by university staff members despite being based on Wikipedia which allows anyone to access, edit and modify content available across all language variants of Wikipedia. It was formally launched on 26 February 2014 by Jaspal Singh, vice-chancellor of Punjabi University.

Punjabipedia includes "Encyclopaedia of Sikhism", a four-volume publication comprising nearly 3,500 entries on various aspects of Sikh history, philosophy and customs for the 6–14 years age group, social, religious movements, art, architecture, shrines, Punjabi grammar, Punjabi conceptual dictionary and linguistic encyclopedia. It also includes Punjab state's history, culture, literature, traditions and other information in Punjabi. Devinder Singh, coordinator of Punjabipedia, on the launch ceremony said that, Punjabi language encyclopaedia 'Mahan Kosh' compiled by Kahn Singh Nabha will be added to the content and database will be enlarged to cover topics relating to not only Punjabi language, art and culture but other subjects as well.

On 21 February 2014 (Mother-tongue day), a Punjabi language awareness march was organized by the Department of Punjabi language of Punjabi University and a call was by made vice-chancellor of the University, Jaspal Singh to make the Punjabi language a language of family, economy, government and of the world.

Parkash Singh Badal, chief minister of Punjab, appreciated the Punjabi University's effort to promote the Punjab state and Punjabi language.
