= Yoav Kutner =

Israeli radio DJ (born 1954)

- יואב קוטנר
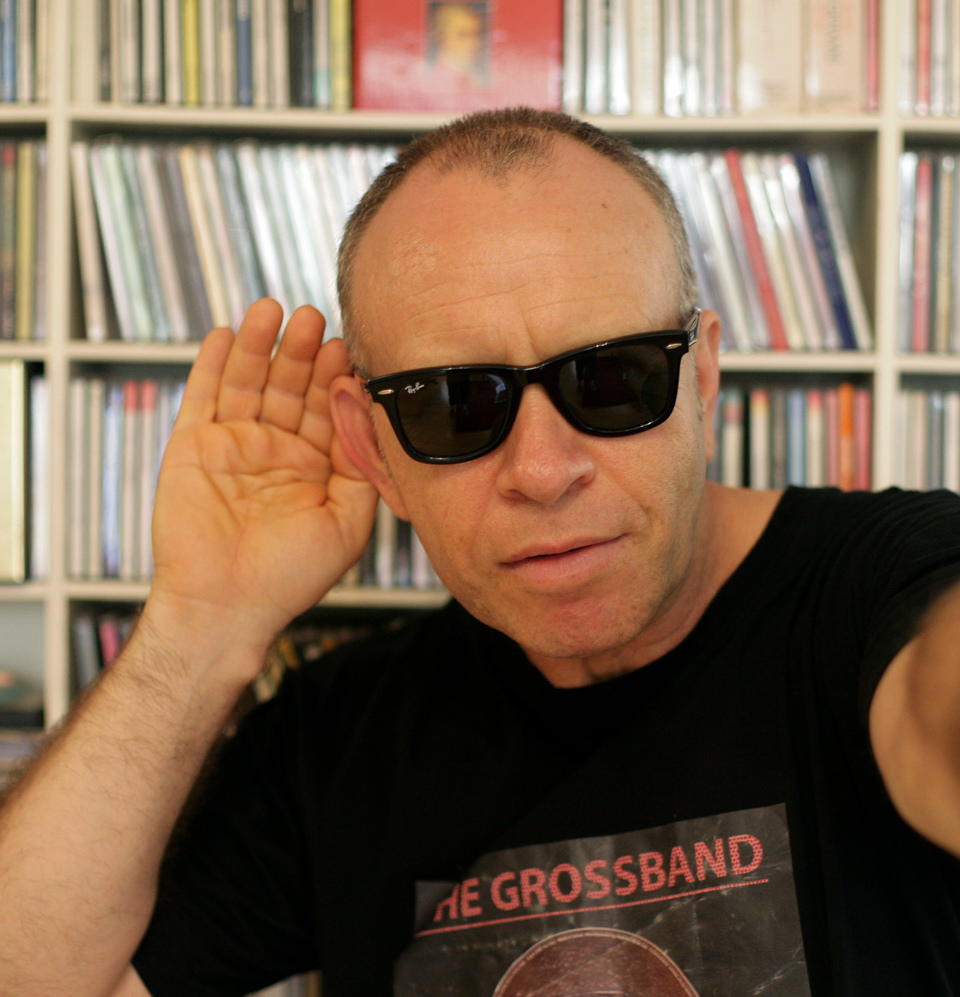
- Born: 18 May 1954 (age 72); Jerusalem
- Years active: 1974 - present
- Presenting career
- Show: The Little Man from the Radio; The History of Israeli Rock
- Style: Disc jockey
- Country: Israel

Yoav Kutner (Hebrew: יואב קוטנר; born 18 May 1954) is an Israeli music editor, TV and radio presenter, who has significantly promoted performers ranging from Mashina to Radiohead.

== Life ==
Yoav Kutner was born in Jerusalem. Kutner lives and works in Tel Aviv, Israel. He is married and has three children together with his wife, Yael. In 1968 he began his studies in the Military Academy in Tel Aviv, and was roommates with Gabi Ashkenazi. In 1972, during a vacation in Switzerland with his classmates prior to joining the Israel Defense Forces, Kutner fell while mountain climbing. Following the accident, he suffered from amnesia. During his rehabilitation, he learned to read and write again and to get to know his family and friends. Music became something that helped him. Instead of joining the Sayeret Matkal unit, which was his plan before the accident, Kutner volunteered to serve in the IDF Radio.

== Work ==
=== Radio ===
Kutner edited and presented radio shows in the Israel Defense Forces Radio from December 1974 to December 1993, and from 1985 onwards had his own daily show. He edited hundreds of other music shows among them "The Magical Mystery Tour" (מסע הקסם המסתורי), a 60-hour radio show exploring the history of The Beatles. As a radio editor, Kutner was always in the search for new stimulating music. He promoted numerous artists in his radio shows, and in the case of Radiohead a local representative of EMI had introduced the song Creep to him. Kutner played it incessantly on the radio. The song became a hit and following that Radiohead was invited to Tel Aviv to their first gig outside the UK.

In an interview with Assaf Nevo he said "The attempts to widen the mainstream and to enable musicians to move from the margins to the center had been my mission since I've been dealing with music".

=== TV ===
Kutner founded the "Pop Corner" in the legendary TV show Zehu Ze! from 1978 to 1996. Through live shows of guest artists and video clips he exposed the audience to new music on a weekly basis. In 1998 he edited and presented "Sof Onat HaTapuzim", a TV series exploring the history of Israeli rock.

In 2003 Kutner was among the founders and Editor-in-Chief of "24"- the Israeli TV music channel. He left the channel in 2007.

=== Journalism ===
From 1981 to 1997, Kutner wrote about music in "7 Days", Israel's weekly journal of the daily Yedioth Ahronoth.

=== Internet ===
Kutner was among the founders of Mooma, a website dedicated to Israeli music and he has written many biographies and discographies of the artists in the site.

== Honours ==
Kutner was awarded several prizes for his programs. For "Paul McCartney is Dead" a prize from the Israel Defense Forces Radio (1978) and the Tamuz Prize for "Sof Onat HaTapuzim", a TV series exploring the history of Israeli rock broadcast on Channel 1.
