= Ganfyd =

Online medical encyclopedia

- Website type: Wiki
- Available in: English
- Website: ganfyd.org at the Wayback Machine (archived 2019-03-22)
- Commercial: No
- Registration: Required
- Launched: November 2005; 20 years ago
- Current status: Defunct

Ganfyd was a medical wiki and online encyclopedia, created in November 2005 by a group of doctors and medical students working in the United Kingdom. The site has been the subject of academic exposition into emerging methods of disseminating medical information and more specifically, the restricting of editors within an open collaborative wiki environment. This model has subsequently been copied by other medical wikis, but some attempts to improve on the model, such as Medpedia have failed. In 2010, Paula Younger noted it as a laudable attempt to make medical information freely accessible and authoritative.

== Authorship ==
Only registered medical practitioners or persons working under their direction, and a small number of invited non-medical specialists, could edit ganfyd articles, and its license specifically prohibited editing by people who are not registered medical practitioners, but permitted reproduction and distribution. The intention is to make the articles reliable enough for professional medical use. An audit trail was publicly available for each article. Registration was by a variety of mechanisms, including a GMC Certificate or equivalent.

== History ==
Ganfyd was intended to become a large online textbook of human medicine. By October 2010 there were over 2,000 page hits a day and it had reached 7,000 topic pages with over double that number of pages including stubs and redirects and 449 editors from six countries (United Kingdom, Australia, New Zealand, Canada, Ireland, United States). As of 2016 it had over 10,000 topic pages.

In December 2006, the Ganfyd site was noted as a specific example of a wiki being used as a low cost alternative to commercial point of care tools like UpToDate with the search portal Trip already indexing it. This may be the first example of a medical wiki being indexed by an independent medical search engine.

In 2011 Ganfyd wiki was compared to Wikipedia, and described as a wiki written by the doctors for the doctors, unlike Wikipedia, which is targeted to a broader audience.

This Medical Wiki went offline on 27 March 2019 due to an unrecoverable server issue. Although backups existed, in the context of the rebuild necessary to maintain high quality web content for a similar period of time to the initial build given the success of the site in terms of web hits, it was decided to suspend operations and return operating expenses donations. In the context of the later COVID-19 pandemic a former editor still involved in accurate health care information dissemination noted that "it would have been quite impossible personally to maintain both effective editorial oversight of GANFYD during this evolving crisis and the more important for NHS patients dissemination of accurate and timely information through official NHS channels". GANFYD has apparently commenced the process of resurfacing as an historical archive as of November 2022. Its content with regard to SARS and MERS for example is believed to represent good evidence of the key knowledge decision makers in democracies should have considered in their public health and health care resilience plans. Its comments on vaccination were disregarded or distorted by some anti vaccination groups to their ends. The failure of politicians to understand or promote such understanding of the evidence based whole system changes needed to mitigate a post pandemic winter pressure or nursing resource issue as such changes would not deliver on short-term goals could be noted. might have similar resonance to some.

== Meaning ==
"Ganfyd" is an acronym meaning "Get a note from your doctor." This phrase is known to be used by employers, insurance underwriters, and sports instructors to their respective employees/clients. In some cases, this may be intended to absolve the employer/instructor from liability in the event that the client suffers physical harm.

Some medical practitioners regard this as a cynical use of their time and skill, thus they use the term "ganfyd" pejoratively.

== See also ==
- List of medical wikis
