= Christian Cyclopedia =

Compendium of theological data

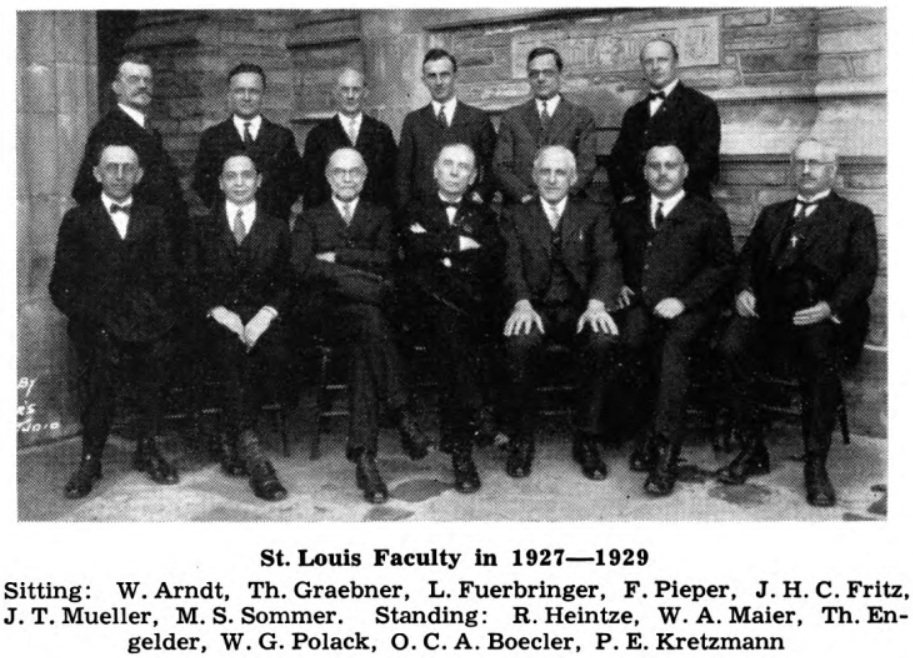
Ludwig Fuerbringer (back row, third from the left) with the faculty of the St. Louis Seminary in 1927–1929

Christian Cyclopedia (originally Lutheran Cyclopedia) is a one-volume compendium of theological data, ranging from ancient figures to contemporary events. It is published by Concordia Publishing House as an update to the Concordia Cyclopedia of 1927, authored by Ludwig Fuerbringer. The 1927 version was an update to The Lutheran Cyclopedia (New York: Charles Scribner's Sons, 1898), edited by Henry Eyster Jacobs and Charles A. W. Haas, of the General Council and its Lutheran Theological Seminary at Philadelphia. Because the shift from the 1898 to 1927 versions occurred between different denominations of Lutherans, the point of view for certain articles shifted accordingly. However, other articles have barely changed at all between even the 1898 and 2000 Cyclopedias.

== See also ==
- List of online encyclopedias § Religion and theology
