= James Harley Marsh =

Canadian encyclopedist, editor and writer

James Harley Marsh CM
- Born: September 10, 1943 (age 82); Toronto, Ontario, Canada
- Occupations: encyclopedist; editor; writer

James Harley Marsh CM (born September 10, 1943) is a Canadian editor, writer and encyclopedist.

He was the editor of a centennial history of Canada called Canada: Unity and Diversity and of a series of social studies volumes - writing one of them along the way (The Fishermen of Lunenburg).

From 1970 to 1980 Marsh was the editor of the Carleton Library Series, a series of scholarly works on Canadian history and social science that made a significant contribution to the growth of Canadian studies in universities. In 10 years he edited 60 volumes in the series while co-authoring his first textbook on Canadian history, New Beginnings.

After 33 years as the founding editor of The Canadian Encyclopedia, James Marsh retired on March 31, 2013. He was described as a 'Canadian who changed the world' by The Globe and Mail newspaper.

== The Canadian Encyclopedia ==
Edmonton publisher Mel Hurtig brought Marsh to Edmonton in 1980 to be the editor in chief of The Canadian Encyclopedia. There Marsh drew up plans for Canada's first comprehensive encyclopedia since the 1950s and hired some 40 staff, 400 consultants and several thousand contributors. The ambitious project was completed and published to laudatory reviews in September 1985.

James Marsh has been editor-in-chief of all three print editions of The Canadian Encyclopedia (1985, 1988 and 1999), of The Junior Encyclopedia of Canada and he has shepherded the encyclopedia into the digital world with numerous CD-ROM versions with publisher McClelland & Stewart and the online versions with the Historica Foundation. He is also the editor in chief of the Canadian Youth Encyclopedia and of The Encyclopedia of Music in Canada.

Since 2000 Marsh has also been Director of Content Development at the Historica Foundation, where he has planned and co-written the web sites "Champlain in Acadia," "Voices: The Canadian Political System," "Canadian Black History Portal," "Asia Canada," and "HistoryWire.ca."

== Selected works ==
- The Fishermen of Lunenburg (1968)
- The Fur Trade in Canada (1969)
- The Exploration of Canada (1970)
- New Beginnings: a Social History of Canada, Volumes I & II (1971), co-authored with Daniel Francis
- "Timeline of Canadian and World History" (1983–present)
- Alberta: A Story of the Province and Its People (1993)
- Beginnings: From the First Nations to the Great Migration (1996)
- "Tous les Savoirs du Monde," Lumina (Journal of 18th Century Studies) (2000)
- Co-editor, Alberta: A State of Mind (2005)
- "Alberta's Quiet Revolution: The Early Lougheed Years" in Michael Payne et al., editors, Alberta Formed/Alberta Transformed (2006).
- James Marsh has also been the author of over 100 newspaper articles on Canadian history.

== Honours ==
- Member of the Order of Canada (1987)
- Centenary Medal of the Royal Society of Canada (1986)
- Alberta Centenary Medal (2005)
