= Chalo Chatu =

Free online encyclopedia about Zambia

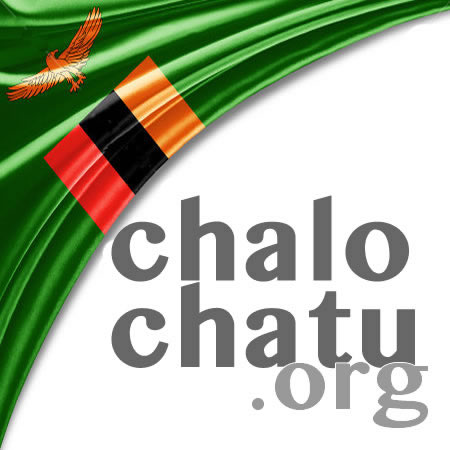

- Screenshot Chalo Chatu main page
- Company type: Charitable organization
- Website type: Online encyclopedia
- Available in: English
- Founded: June 1, 2016; 10 years ago
- Headquarters: Lusaka, Zambia
- Area served: Zambia (2016–present); Worldwide (2017-present)
- Owner: Chalo Chatu Foundation
- Founder: Jason Mulikita
- Key people: Jason Mulikita (Founder and CEO); Chabota Kanguya (COO)
- Industry: Internet
- Website: www.chalochatu.org
- Users: ▲12,116
- Current status: Active
- Content license: Creative Commons licenses Most text is also dual-licensed under GFDL; media licensing varies
- Written in: MediaWiki

Chalo Chatu (Zambian "our world") is an English-language wiki-based free encyclopaedia project created by Jason Mulikita that is dedicated to documenting the history, public figures, and organizations of Zambia. The site uses MediaWiki software to maintain a user-created database of information. The site's content is under a Creative Commons Attribution-ShareAlike 4.0 International License (CC BY-SA 4.0), meaning it is freely available to the public for use, modification, and distribution, including commercial purposes, as long as proper attribution is given and derivative works are shared under the same terms. Chalo Chatu is a work-in-progress, with articles in various stages of completion.

== History ==
The web site was opened on 1 June 2016 and has been active since then. The website was launched with the ".org" top-level domain denoting its non-commercial nature.

== Funding & Nature of the project ==
Chalo Chatu Foundation is documenting an entire nation which no easy task according to the site itself. The main aim of the project is to document everything that has to-do with Zambia. The stated aim of the project is "preserving the History and Pride of Zambia ". Chalo Chatu is a non-profit so it gets fundings through the donations that people make. The organization that runs the project does not have its own equipment and is constantly relying on individual volunteers to use their own equipment, such as computers and cameras, to gather information.
