= Turkpidya =

Online encyclopedia focused on Turkey and Turkic countries

- The logo of Turkpidya
- Website type: Online encyclopedia
- Available in: 24 languages
- List of languages English German Danish Spanish French Italian Hungarian Dutch Portuguese Romanian Turkish Croatian Polish Czech Greek Bulgarian Russian Serbian Hebrew Arabic Persian Japanese Korean Chinese
- Country of origin: Turkey
- Owner: Abdullah Habib
- Website: turkpidya.com
- Registration: None
- Launched: June 2020
- Current status: Active

Turkpidya is the first online encyclopedia about Turkey and Turkic countries, founded in June 2020 by Abdullah Habib. The platform offers information on a range of topics related to Turkey, including its culture, history, and economy.

== Development and features ==
Turkpidya was established in the middle of 2020 by Abdullah Habib, a student at Eskisehir Technical University. Habib, who has Egyptian and Turkish heritage, founded the platform drawing from his personal background.

Turkpidya was initially launched supporting Turkish, Arabic, English, and German. The platform, now offering content in 23 languages, seeks to provide information about Turkey and other Turkic nations.

Turkpidya has expressed intentions to align with Turkey's 11th Development Plan by establishing partnerships with the Turkish Ministry of Foreign Affairs, the Ministry of Culture and Tourism, and the Ministry of Commerce.

The team of Turkpidya, now consisting of different members, translators and volunteers globally, produces content on a variety of topics.

=== Growth ===
In 2020, Turkpidya's founder stated that they have 200 articles making approximately a total of written 150 thousand words.

In early 2023, people who visit the site read an average of 100 thousand words every day.

== Expanding to other Turkic nations ==
Turkpidya's expansion plans include extending its coverage beyond Turkey to encompass other Turkic nations. The expansion, as planned by the Turkish encyclopedia includes incorporating information about the diverse cultures, histories, and economies of Turkic states, include nations such as Kazakhstan and Azerbaijan.

== See also ==
- List of online encyclopedias
