= Unam Wiki =

South Korean conservative wiki

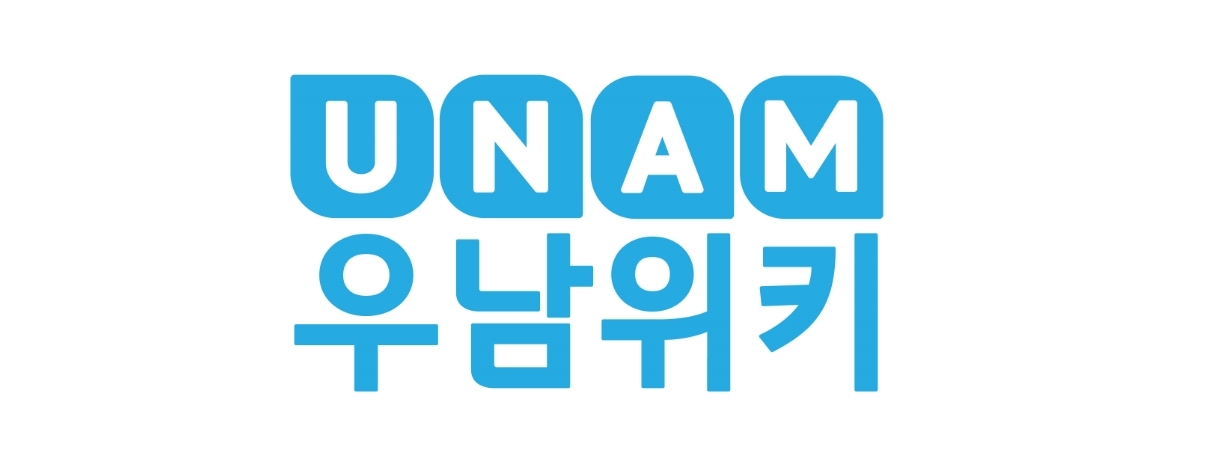
- Website type: Wiki
- Available in: Korean
- Country of origin: South Korea
- Founder: Park Seong-hyeon
- Website: www.unamwiki.org/w/
- Launched: August 20, 2018

Unam Wiki (Korean: 우남위키) is a South Korean wiki founded in 2018. It is named for the art name of the first president of South Korea, Syngman Rhee. As of January 2026, it has 21,369 articles.

It was founded by Park Seong-hyeon (박성현) on August 20, 2018. The wiki intentionally forwards South Korean conservative views. Park founded it expressly to counter what he felt were left-wing or communist narratives in other South Korean wikis, particularly namuwiki and the Korean Wikipedia. The wiki reportedly requires that editors share political beliefs that align with the wiki's. By April 2019, the wiki had around 300 members and 30 daily contributors. The website ran workshops and meetings for its community.

== See also ==
- Conservapedia – An American conservative wiki
