= Superpedia =

Superpedia Rumah Ilmu Indonesia
- Website type: Wiki
- Available in: Indonesian language
- Owner: Rumah Ilmu Indonesia Foundation.
- Website: http://superpedia.rumahilmu.or.id
- Commercial: No
- Registration: Not required to read, required to contribute
- Launched: 19 October 2008
- Current status: Active

Superpedia is an Indonesian free-access online dictionary and encyclopedia initiated by the Rumah Ilmu Indonesia Foundation on 19 October 2008.

Superpedia runs on the MediaWiki software, which is also used to run Wikimedia Foundation projects. At the end of January 2010, the number of articles reached 30,000. At the end of January 2011, it was almost 70,000. Its main page is arranged into educational categories like biology, physics and mathematics, written in the Indonesian language.

== Background ==
The Superpedia project was created to close the digital literacy gap in Indonesia. The availability of digital dictionaries and encyclopedias is expected to help teachers to improve their knowledge. Only about 20 million of Indonesia's 230 million population can access the internet, so Superpedia is also distributed freely on CD and DVD.

With Indonesian education activists from schools and non-government organizations, Superpedia trains Indonesian educators to use Superpedia with other open-source software.

== Development scheme ==
Superpedia is designed to include a variety of Indonesian local content, such as Indonesian local languages, including Sundanese and Javanese.

The scheme of the Superpedia development was released in 2009.

== Donation and sponsorship ==
Because Superpedia is a non-profit project, it depends on donations from users. In early 2010, Intel Indonesia became the first company to support Superpedia.

== Awards ==
1. Bronze Category, Internet Sehat Blog & Content Awards (Indonesian ICT Watch) for week 2, March 2010
2. Silver Category, Internet Sehat Blog & Content Awards (Indonesian ICT Watch) for week 2, April 2010 edition
