= ZipcodeZoo =

Online zoological encyclopedia

- Website type: Encyclopedia
- Website: web.archive.org/web/20170715224437/http://zipcodezoo.com/index.php/Main_Page
- Commercial: No
- Registration: Optional
- Launched: September 26, 2004
- Current status: Offline

ZipcodeZoo was a free, online encyclopedia intended to document all living species and infraspecies known to science. It was compiled from existing databases. It offered one page for each living species, supplementing text with video, sound, and images where available. ZipcodeZoo was integrated into an app called Lookup Life. As of 2019 the site no longer works.

ZipcodeZoo was an online database that collected the natural history, classification, species characteristics, conservation biology, and distribution information of thousands of species and infraspecies. It included over 800,000 photographs, 50,000 videos, 160,000 sound clips, and 3.2 million maps describing nearly 3.2 million species and infraspecies. Its content is now only available on the Internet Archive

The site and its sister site lookup.life included a number of specialized search functions, such as identifying a bird species from its color, shape and other traits, including where it was seen; or generating a list of plants or animals likely to be found in or near a specific location (a zipcode, state, country, latitude/longitude, etc.). The searches could be restricted to specific taxa, or broad categories like reptiles or fish. A sound trainer could play multiple bird song recordings simultaneously.

ZipcodeZoo drew on the Catalogue of Life for its basic species list, the Global Biodiversity Information Facility for its maps, Flickr for many of its photos, YouTube for videos, Xeno-canto for some of its sound recordings, the IUCN for conservation status, and other major sources.

All the pages were published under one of the Creative Commons licenses.
