= Encyclopedia Titanica =

Online encyclopedia about the Titanic

- Website type: Internet encyclopedia Resource for research on the RMS Titanic
- Available in: English
- Creator: Philip Hind
- Founder: Philip Hind
- Website: www.encyclopedia-titanica.org
- Commercial: No
- Registration: Optional
- Launched: September 1, 1996; 30 years ago
- Current status: Active

Encyclopedia Titanica is an online reference work containing extensive and constantly updated information on the RMS Titanic. The website, a nonprofit endeavor, is a database of passenger and crew biographies, deck plans, and articles submitted by historians or Titanic enthusiasts. In 1999, The New York Times noted that the site "may be the most comprehensive Titanic site", based on its content including passenger lists and ship plans. The Chicago Tribune called it "a marvelously detailed Internet site."

== History ==
Encyclopedia Titanica was founded by Philip Hind. The website first went online on 1 September 1996. By March 1999, the website had received 600,000 hits.

As of 2024, the website has over 2 million visits and 8.5 million page views.

== Content ==
Encyclopedia Titanica contains a wide range of information about the ship, her passengers and a variety of related subjects. Each passenger and crew member has a separate page containing at least basic biographical data, and many of these contain rare photographs, contemporary news articles, and first-hand accounts by survivors.

The site also contains research articles by Titanic historians, including notable names such as Samuel Halpern, Charles Haas, John Eaton, Bill Wormstedt, Inger Sheil, Paul Lee, and Mark Chirnside (amongst others). The resource's articles and biographies are often cited and referenced in books related to the ship.

=== Message board ===
Encyclopedia Titanica also contains an active message board with (as of November 2012) over 11,700 members and 300,000 messages. Among the topics of discussion on the message board are the following:

- Passenger Research
- Cabin Numbers
- Collision and Sinking Theories
- Crew Research
- Discovery, Salvage and Exploration
- The Gilded Age
- Life on Board
- Lost and Saved
- Ships that may have stood still
- Construction and Design
- Titanic Art, Photography and Music
- Titanic Books
- Titanic Movies
- Titanic on TV
- Other Ships and Shipwrecks
