= MOOMA =

Israeli music website

MOOMA was a web site dedicated to Israeli music. It contained information about Israeli artists from all genres, as well as general articles and news about Israeli music. The site editor was Ayelet Yagil.

The site was created by the Keshet TV group, as part of the group portfolio prepared toward a tender for an Israeli music TV channel.

The major part of the site was an encyclopedia of Peen music and artists, which historically documents significant parts of the Israeli culture. It also has articles in Hebrew about a selection of foreign artists. This information bank was created by the Israeli radio presenter and music critic Yoav Kutner; it included biographies and discographies of many Israeli artists, and links to similar and related artists.

Initially the site included a music magazine, forums and several web radio channels. These were dropped in 2001 after Keshet TV decided to cut the websites' budget, during the 2001 Dot-com bubble burst.

MOOMA's founders then went on to win the music TV channel tender, and launched Music 24. There were trials to reopen the site with government funding, but they failed. Eventually the site reopened with the help of the Lemelbaum family, who requested that the site will be dedicated to the memory of their daughter Ella Loren (1972–2000), a singer and model who died from skin cancer. From 2001 to 2008, Mooma was managed by Ayelet Yagil, who founded Mooma's music encyclopedia with Yoav Kutner

In 2008, the website was merged into the newly created mako.

== See also ==
- Allmusic
