= PCGamingWiki =

Wiki encyclopaedia focused on collecting game behaviour data

- Screenshot Home page as of 19 April 2022
- Company type: Private limited Company
- Website type: Internet encyclopedia
- Available in: British English
- Headquarters: London, England, UK
- Owner: PCGamingWiki Ltd
- Founder: Andrew Tsai
- Industry: PC games
- Website: www.pcgamingwiki.com
- Commercial: No
- Registration: Optional
- Users: 300+ active users 35,000+ registered users
- Launched: 9 February 2012; 14 years ago
- Current status: Active
- Content licence: CC BY-NC-SA 3.0

The PCGamingWiki is a British-based collaboratively edited wiki internet encyclopaedia focused on collecting video game behaviour data (such as save locations and startup parameters), to optimising gameplay, and fixing issues found in PC games. Intended fixes and optimisations range from simple cutscene removals, to modifications that allow for wide-screen resolutions, and more. The wiki site runs on MediaWiki software, and was created by Andrew Tsai, a British businessman from London, England. The site was founded on 9 February 2012; 14 years ago. As of October 2022, the PCGamingWiki has more than 30,000 registered users, and 48,000 content pages. Since its inception, the PCGamingWiki has been featured on numerous gaming-focused websites, including Kotaku, Destructoid, and Rock Paper Shotgun. It regularly receives more than 10,000 unique page views a day.

== History ==
The PCGamingWiki was founded on 9 February 2012 by Andrew Tsai, who is also known under the username "Andytizer". Tsai was motivated to create the wiki based on his experiences with the games L.A. Noire and Titan Quest. The wiki was mostly barren until Tsai enlisted the help of users on the website Reddit.

On 11 April 2012, Tsai attempted to Kickstart the PCGamingWiki with a goal of $60,000. The project ended on 12 May 2012, failing to complete its goal and only earning $2,736. On 19 December 2012 the project was put on Kickstarter again, this time with a goal of £500. This was much more successful, ending on 20 January 2013 with more than 400% funding.

On 24 December 2012, the PCGamingWiki forums were created with help from user JRWR. The forums are used to discuss articles, improvements, fix problems, and report bugs. As of March 2014, there have been 3374 posts to the forums.

On 26 March 2013, Tsai announced a new section of the PCGamingWiki network entitled The Port Report. The Port Report would function in a similar way to the, then recently defunct, Port Authority section of GameSpy. The Port Report would focus on video games ported from video game console to PC, and judge them based on their technical prowess, rather than story or gameplay. Based on similar concepts from the wiki, The Port Report allows anyone to submit articles for publishing.

On 29 November 2014, a Patreon funding campaign with the goal of supporting the website was launched.

In April 2020, the wiki launched new categories to track a game's monetisation model, including the types of microtransactions present.
