= AhmadiPedia =

Online encyclopedia on the Ahmadiyya Muslim Community

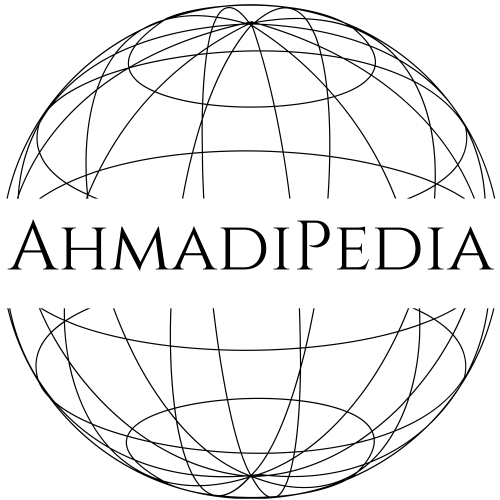
- The AhmadiPedia logo

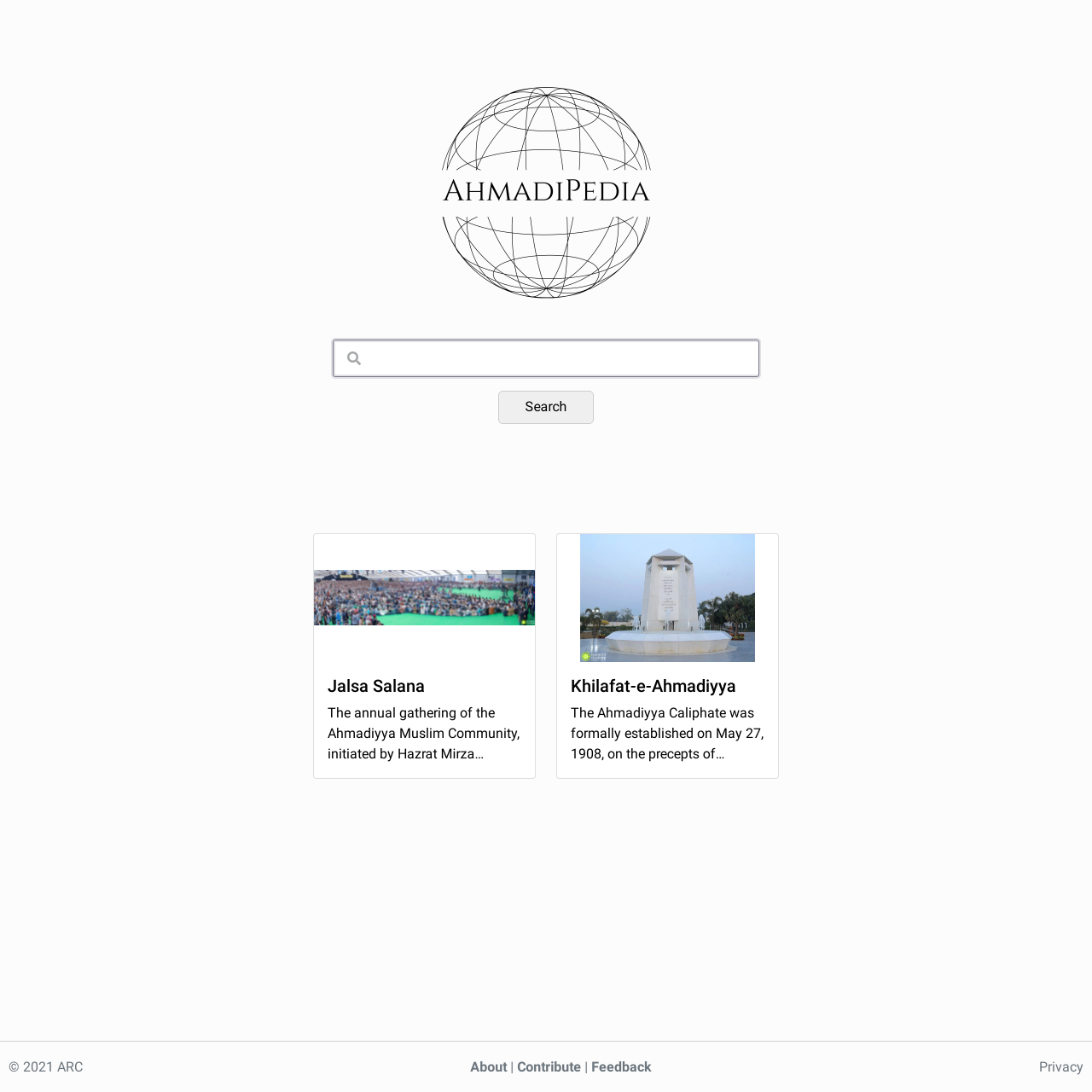
- Screenshot AhmadiPedia homepage
- Website type: Online encyclopedia
- Available in: English
- Founder: Hazrat Mirza Masroor Ahmad
- Editors: Ahmadiyya Archive & Research Centre
- Website: AhmadiPedia.org
- Commercial: No
- Launched: July 2, 2021 (5 years ago)
- Current status: Active

AhmadiPedia (/ˌɑːməˈdiːpiːdiə/; a portmanteau of "The Ahmadiyya Encyclopaedia") is an online encyclopedia dedicated to the study of the Worldwide Ahmadiyya Muslim Community. It is edited and maintained by the Ahmadiyya Archive & Research Centre (ARC) and is an official publication of the Ahmadiyya Muslim Jamaat.

== Background ==
According to the curator at ARC, "a need was felt that a resource is created where Ahmadis and even non-Ahmadis could search for information about the Ahmadiyya Muslim Jamaat." Hence, AhmadiPedia was launched.

== Launch ==
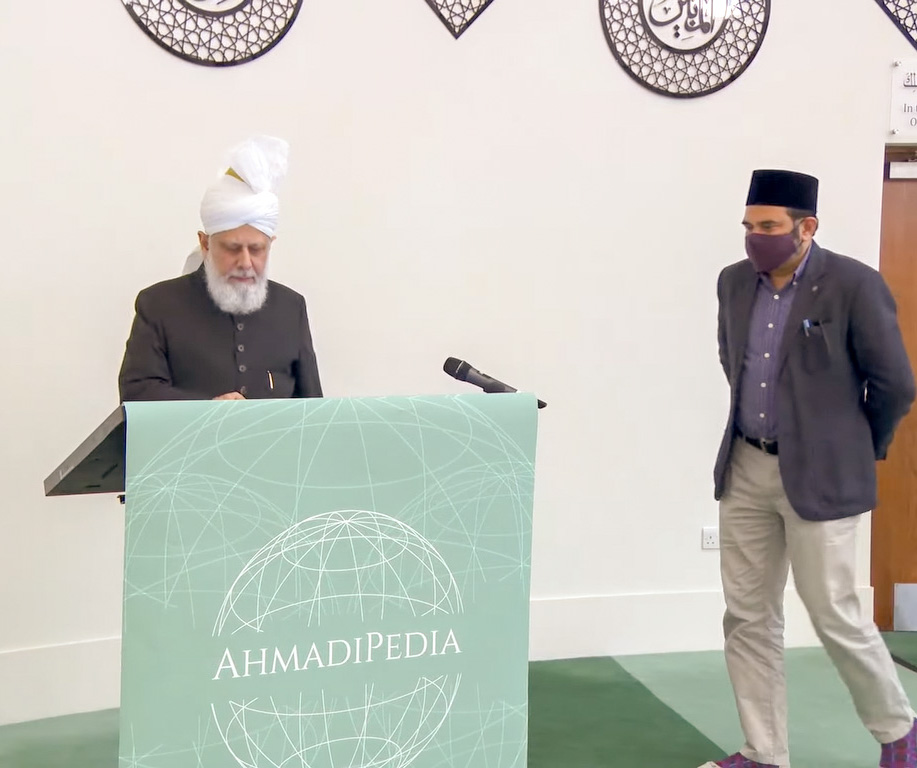
Hazrat Mirza Masroor Ahmad, at the launch of AhmadiPedia, Friday 2 July 2021, Mubarak Mosque, Islamabad, Tilford, Farnham, UK.

AhmadiPedia was launched on 2 July 2021 by Hazrat Mirza Masroor Ahmad, the fifth worldwide head of the Ahmadiyya Muslim Jamaat, after the Friday prayers. Announcing the launch during his Friday sermon, he stated:

I would like to make an announcement and that is that an Ahmadiyya Encyclopaedia has been created and will be launched today; it has been prepared by the Central Ahmadiyya Archive & Research Centre. They began work on it some time ago and now, by the grace of Allah the Almighty, this website is being made available... It is available on www.ahmadipedia.org, where a homepage containing a search engine will open and can be used to search for information...

== Content ==
AhmadiPedia is edited by a team of editors at the ARC who draw on the primary sources of the Ahmadiyya Muslim Community for their content. The encyclopedia entries give concise information but provide links and references to the Community's literature for further study.

Users have also been given the option to provide material via the 'contribute' page, which is then edited and uploaded to the website by the editors.

== Censorship of AhmadiPedia ==
Pakistan Telecommunication Authority (PTA) regularly blocks content from Ahmadiyya websites, including AhmadiPedia.org. Hence, just over a month into its launch, AhmadiPedia was blocked in Pakistan.
