= XLAB d.o.o =

Software development company

XLAB, d.o.o.
- Type: Private limited company
- Industry: Software and consulting
- Founded: 2001, Ljubljana
- Headquarters: Ljubljana, Slovenia
- Key people: Gregor Berginc (director), Jure Pompe (director)
- Products: ISL Online, XLAB Steampunk, Gaea+, XLAB Insights, MedicView
- Number of employees: ~100
- Website: www.xlab.si/?lang=en

XLAB d.o.o. is an IT company based in Slovenia and focused on remote desktop technology, automation and management of hybrid infrastructure, and artificial intelligence.

== Research ==
XLAB Research is among largest Slovenian private computer science research departments and 1st SME in Slovenia in terms of H2020 funded research projects. It has been involved in more than 80 research projects and has coordinated 2 of them, earning the title of the first Slovenian coordinator of a Horizon 2020 project.
