= Canadian Pop Music Encyclopedia =

Two-volume encyclopedia of Canadian pop music from 1949 onwards

The Canadian Pop Music Encyclopedia is a two volume encyclopedia of Canadian pop music, available in hardcover and online, detailing Canadian music from 1949 onwards.

== History ==
The Canadian Pop Music Encyclopedia was started by Jaimie Vernon on July 1, 1998, as an online service of the Toronto Sun newspaper website CANOE. Vernon had been advised by music journalist John Sakamoto that the Toronto Sun had licensed a music encyclopedia, but that the company was not satisfied with it. They hired Vernon to write a new online edition in 1998.

The encyclopedia was originally based on Vernon's association with independent Canadian label Bullseye Records, established by Vernon in 1985, where Vernon began to collect information about notable Canadian bands. This led to the publication of a music magazine, Great White Noise, which became the blueprint for the eventual hardcover version of the Encyclopedia.

Volume One of the Encyclopedia was released in hardcover March 1, 2012. Volume Two of the Encyclopedia was released in hardcover November 14, 2012. A double sized single edition was released to Long & McQuade Music stores in Canada in 2013 but has since been discontinued. A Volume One e-Book was released in 2013. A Volume Two e-Book was also released in 2013.

The primary criteria for inclusion in the encyclopedia is that a band has been in existence for at least a year and has released music in a commercial format or as a commercially released solo act. Many Canadian music photographers have contributed material to the encyclopedia, including John Rowlands, Andrew MacNaughton, John Fraser and Allison Janzen.
