= Encyclopaedia Metallum =

Website on metal bands

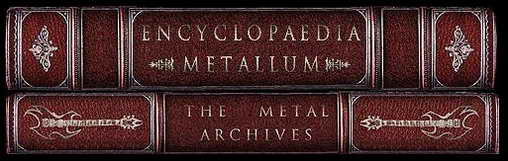
- Logo
- Website type: Music database, reviews
- Owners: Morrigan, HellBlazer
- Creators: Morrigan, HellBlazer
- Website: metal-archives.com
- Commercial: No
- Registration: Optional
- Launched: July 2002
- Current status: Active

Encyclopaedia Metallum: The Metal Archives (commonly known as Metal Archives per the URL or abbreviated as MA) is an online encyclopedia based upon musical artists who predominantly perform heavy metal music along with its various sub-genres. The contents are user-generated. Encyclopaedia Metallum was described by Matt Sullivan of Nashville Scene as "the Internet's central database for all that is 'tr00' in the metal world." Terrorizer described the site as "a fully-exhaustive list of pretty much every metal band ever, with full discographies, an active forum and an interlinking members list that shows the ever-incestuous beauty of the metal scene". Nevertheless, there are numerous exceptions for bands which fall under disputed genres not accepted by the website.

Encyclopaedia Metallum attempts to provide comprehensive information on each band, such as a discography, logos, pictures, lyrics, line-ups, biography, trivia and user-submitted reviews. The site also provides a system for submitting bands to the archives. The website is free of advertisements and is run completely independently.

== History ==
The Encyclopaedia Metallum was launched in July 2002 by a Canadian couple from Montreal using the pseudonyms HellBlazer and Morrigan. The site initially went live early in July 2002 and the first band (Amorphis) was added on July 7, 2002.

A 2018 study of Encyclopaedia Metallum's database of approximately 350,000 musicians active between 1964 and 2015 found that 97% of metal musicians were male and only 3% were female, though the latter figure has increased slightly since the 1970s. In January 2022, Stereogum reported that death metal bands made up the largest portion of Encyclopaedia Metallum's database by a significant margin, with approximately 51,000 bands listed, but noted that when looking at the highest number of active bands, the amount by which death metal had the most entries was proportionately much smaller.

== See also ==
- Heavy metal subculture
- List of online music databases
- List of online encyclopedias
