= Online encyclopedia =

Encyclopedia accessible via the internet

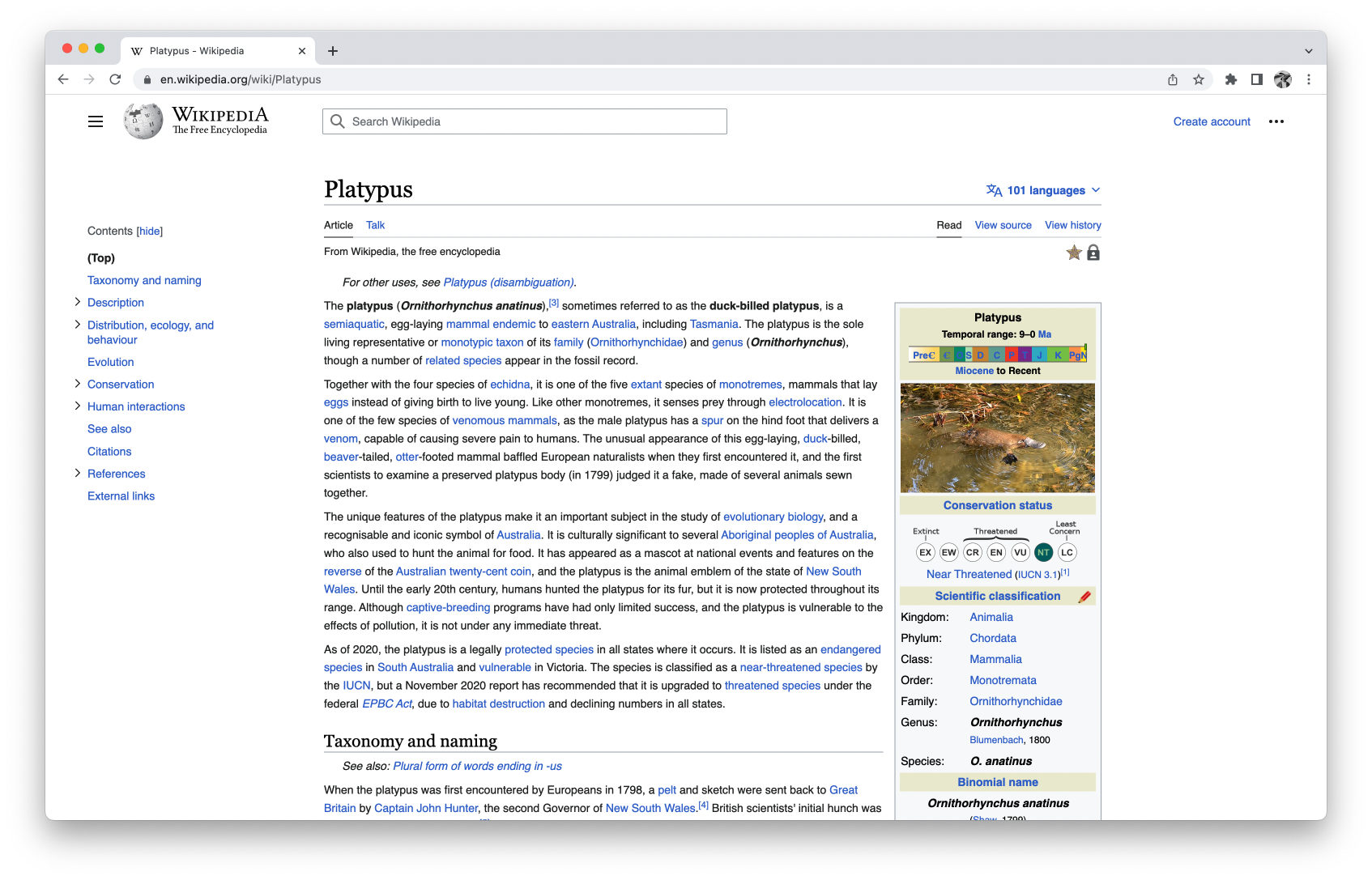
Wikipedia is an example of an online encyclopedia, the content of which is created by volunteer contributors.

An online encyclopedia, also called an Internet encyclopedia, is a digital encyclopedia accessible through the Internet. Some examples include pre-World Wide Web services that offered the Academic American Encyclopedia beginning in 1980, Encyclopedia.com since 1998, Encarta from 2000 to 2009, Wikipedia since 2001, Encyclopædia Britannica beginning in 1994 (now at Britannica.com), and Grokipedia since 2025.

== Digitization of existing content ==
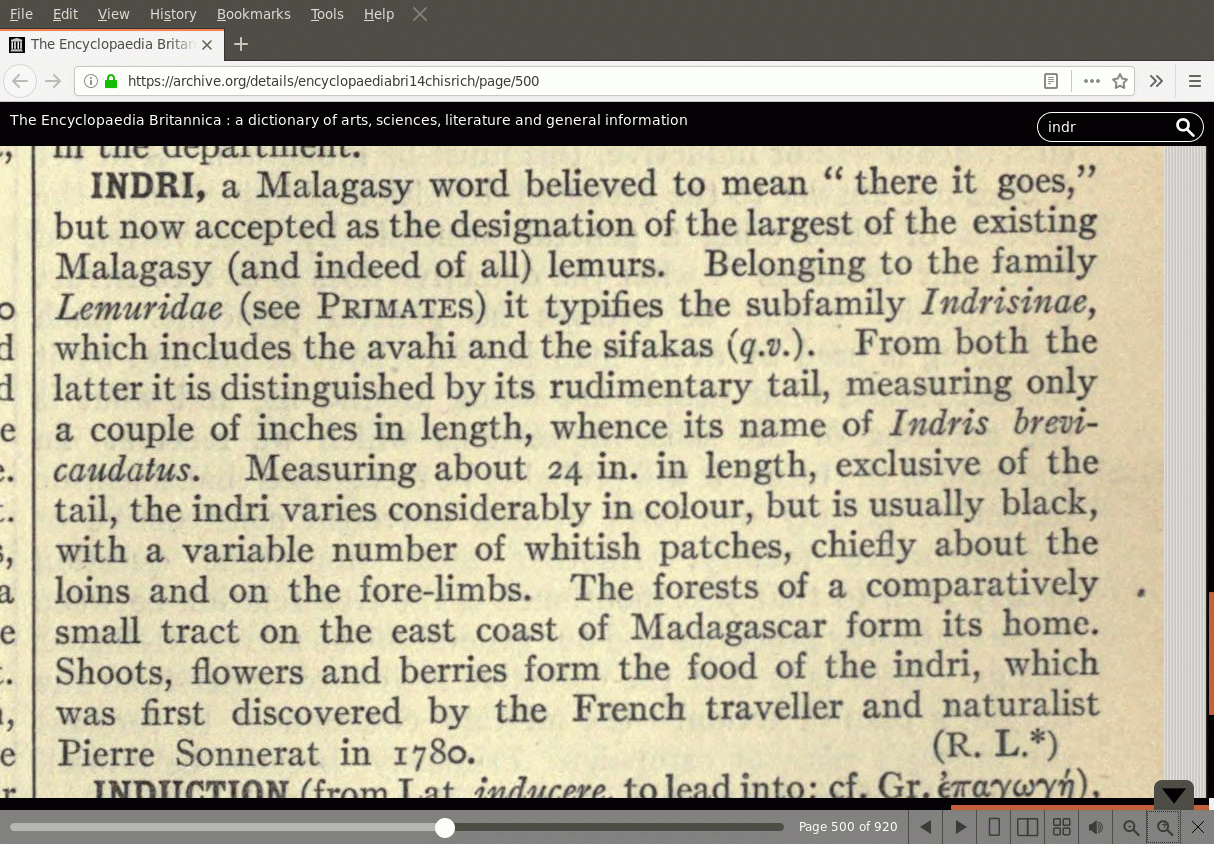
A scan of the 11th edition of Encyclopedia Britannica at archive.org

In January 1995, Project Gutenberg started to publish the ASCII text of the Encyclopædia Britannica, 11th edition (1911), but disagreements about the method halted the work after the first volume. For trademark reasons, the text had been published as the Gutenberg Encyclopedia. Since then, Project Gutenberg digitized and proofread the encyclopedia, until the last update in September 2018. Project Gutenberg published volumes in alphabetical order; the most recent publication is Volume 17 Slice 1: "Lord Chamberlain" to "Luqman", published on August 9, 2013. The latest Britannica was digitized by its publishers, and sold first as a CD-ROM, and later as an online service.

In 2001, ASCII text of all 28 volumes was published on Encyclopædia Britannica Eleventh Edition by source; a copyright claim was added to the materials included. The website no longer exists.

Other digitization projects have made progress in other titles; one example is Easton's Bible Dictionary (1897) digitized by the Christian Classics Ethereal Library.

The Great Russian Encyclopedia, a successor to the Great Soviet Encyclopedia, was released online in 2022, but has since been discontinued.

Other websites provide online encyclopedias, some of which are also available on Wikisource or the Internet Archive. However, some may be more complete than others, or may be from different editions.

== Online creation of new content ==
Another early online encyclopedia was called the Global Encyclopedia. In November 1995, James Rettig, Assistant Dean of University Libraries for Reference and Information Services at College of William & Mary, presented an unfavorable review at the 15th Annual Charleston Conference on library acquisitions and related issues. He said of the Global Encyclopedia:

This is a volunteer effort to compile an encyclopedia and distribute it for free on the World Wide Web. If you have ever yearned to be the author of an encyclopedia article, yearn no longer. Take a minute (or even two or three if you are feeling scholarly) to write an article on a topic of your choosing and [e]mail it off to the unnamed "editors". These editors (to use that title very loosely) have generated a list of approximately 1,300 topics they want to include; to date, perhaps a quarter of them have been treated. ... This so-called encyclopedia gives amateurism a bad name. It is being compiled without standards or guidelines for article structure, content, or reading level. It makes no apparent effort to check the qualifications and authority of the volunteer authors. Its claim that "Submitted articles are fact-checked, corrected for spelling, and then formatted" is at best an exaggeration.

Examples of article entries included Iowa City:

A city of approximately 60,000 people, Iowa City lies in the eastern half of Iowa. It is also the home of the University of Iowa (https://www.uiowa.edu).

Other similar encyclopedia projects included the privately owned Nupedia, created in March 2000 by the dot-com company Bomis, and GNUpedia, a free content project created in January 2001 under the auspices of the Free Software Foundation. Both projects are now defunct.

The concept of an online encyclopedia, labelled the "world encyclopaedia" and inspired by the World Brain essays of H. G. Wells, was considered by one of the creators of the Viewdata system, Samuel Fedida, as a potential application for this new medium. Leveraging the hierarchical structure of Viewdata pages or frames, Fedida envisaged frames at higher or more shallow levels in the medium covering topics in a simpler fashion, and those at lower or deeper levels introducing steadily greater complexity in their coverage. He also acknowledged a need for an "ability to add cross-references", and that this might change the Viewdata paradigm. Writing in 1979, he noted that substantial practical obstacles remained for such an online resource, estimating the need for low latency storage of around "one hundred million megabyte", equivalent to more than 100,000 of the largest disks available at that time.

== Wiki-based encyclopedias ==
Founded by Jimmy Wales and Larry Sanger in 2001 as a subproject of Bomis' Nupedia, Wikipedia is a free content, multilingual online encyclopedia written and maintained by a community of volunteer contributors, known as Wikipedians, through a model of real-time open collaboration via wiki software. Now operated by the non-profit Wikimedia Foundation, Wikipedia is the largest and most-read reference work in history.

Because of Wikipedia's liberal content licensing policy, content forks of Wikipedia can be created without needing permission. A number of forks of Wikipedia exist, created with a variety of different goals, including those created to further political viewpoints. Major examples include online encyclopedias supporting state ideologies such as the Russian Wikipedia fork Ruviki, China's open-content Wikipedia fork Qiuwen Baike, and Baidu Baike, a mostly locally created Chinese encyclopedia built partly on Wikipedia content.

A number of small wiki-based encyclopedias have been created to advocate for niche political or religious goals; these include Conservapedia, RationalWiki, and Citizendium.

== See also ==
- Digital library
- List of online encyclopedias
- Reference software
