= EIC =

EIC may refer to:

== Companies and organizations ==
- East India Company, a major British company that once controlled major parts of the Indian subcontinent
- East India Club, a gentlemen's club in London
- East India Comedy, an Indian comedy group
- Edison Illuminating Company, an electric power company in the United States
- Emmanuel International Canada, a non-profit, evangelical Christian relief organization
- Encompass Insurance Company, of New Jersey
- Energy in Common, an American renewable energy organization
- Engineering Institute of Canada
- Ensemble InterContemporain, an orchestra in Paris
- Entertainment Industries Council, an American public health organization
- Environmental Information Coalition, creators of the Encyclopedia of Earth
- Estonian Iraqi Contingent, unit of the Estonian military in Iraq
- État indépendant du Congo, formal name for the Congo Free State
- European Innovation Council, introduced by the European Commission to support the commercialization of high-risk, high-impact ideas
- European International Contractors, association, affiliated by its members of European international contractors, dealing with all questions arising from international construction
- European Investigative Collaborations, a journalism organization

== Schools ==
- Ealing Independent College, in West London
- Edinburgh International College, in Scotland
- Cherbourg School of Engineering (French: École d'Ingénieurs de Cherbourg), in France
- International School of Carthage (French: École Internationale de Carthage), in Tunis, Tunisia

== Other ==
- Education in Chemistry, a magazine
- Earned Income Credit, in the United States
- East Iceland Current
- Eastern Indiana Conference, in northeastern Indiana from 1953 to 1975
- Eastern Intercollegiate Conference, a defunct NCAA conference
- Editor-in-chief
- Electron–ion collider, a proposed type of particle accelerator collider
- Electronic identity card
- Employer Identification Number, assigned by the United States Internal Revenue Service
- Energy Identification Code, to identify gas and electricity assets, actors, and jurisdictions in Europe
- Excellence in Cities, a British government program
- Exercise-induced collapse, a genetic syndrome in dogs
- Extracted-ion chromatogram, a representation of data in hyphenated mass spectrometry/chromatography

== See also ==
- East India Company (disambiguation)
