= Ignore all rules =

Policy of the English Wikipedia

"Ignore all rules" (IAR) is a policy of the English Wikipedia, which reads: "If a rule prevents you from improving or maintaining Wikipedia, ignore it. [sic]" The rule, under different language, was proposed by Wikipedia co-founder Larry Sanger to encourage editors to add information without focusing excessively on formatting, though Sanger later criticized the rule's effects on the community.

The policy allows Wikipedia users to occasionally work around the site's rules without rejecting the entire rule system. A study in 2012 found that in "Articles for deletion" discussions, which determine whether a Wikipedia article should be deleted, comments were given more weight when they used IAR as justification.

== History ==
Wikipedia was launched on January 15, 2001, with few policies, the intention being that users would determine rules via consensus. "Ignore all rules" was proposed by Wikipedia co-founder Larry Sanger on a "rules to consider page", and became one of the first formal guidelines of Wikipedia. Sanger later said that his intention was to convey that "people should not worry about getting formatting right and getting every single detail of policy under their belts before they started contributing". Having conceived of the rule as a "temporary and humorous injunction", he rejected it in his later project Citizendium as "other people were taking it seriously".

The original formulation of the rule was:

If rules make you nervous and depressed, and not desirous of participation in the Wiki, then ignore them and go about your business.

The current formulation of the rule is:

If a rule prevents you from improving or maintaining Wikipedia, ignore it. [emphasis in original]

Sanger has since opined that his proposal of IAR was "ironic", as was his rejection of a formal title and enforceable authority. In Open Sources 2.0, he describes these things as "clearly mistakes on [his] part", as they prevented him from enforcing rules. Sanger proposes that a "founding community charter" would have aided with issues in the community of Wikipedia, though he believes IAR and other early decisions did "help the project get off the ground".

== Meaning ==
A flowchart relating to usage of rules on Wikipedia, displayed in the Wikipedia essay "What 'Ignore all rules' means"

"Ignore all rules" refers to the idea that a user is permitted to violate a rule on a case-by-case basis, if the rule's application could cause negative consequences. IAR provides agency for an editor whilst protecting the site's set of rules; it augments Wikipedia's bureaucratic structure. It is a logical impossibility, or a paradox, as its inclusion in Wikipedia's set of rules "makes rule violation an expected behavior". It is a variation of the barber's paradox.

"What "Ignore all rules" means", a Wikipedia essay, attempts to provide clarification as to the scope of IAR. The policy is argued not to justify all actions or prevent users from being held accountable for their edits. It is instead said to encourage the use of personal judgement and allow novices to contribute without full awareness of every policy and guideline.

It has been said that upon conception, IAR was partially "an admission that early contributors often faced situations in which any extant rule would not make sense". However, as the project developed, this became less relevant and by 2015 it had "become very difficult to find a situation in which no existing rule would apply".

The rule is closely related to "Wikipedia has no firm rules", the fifth of the "five pillars" which summarize the site's "fundamental principles". It also links to the guideline which states that Wikipedia editors should "be bold", an idea which Sanger proposed "in a similar spirit" to IAR.

A 2008 article notes that though the policy is "only sixteen words long, the page explaining what the policy means contains over 500 words, refers readers to seven other documents, has generated over 8,000 words of discussion, and has been changed over 100 times in less than a year". It evaluates the word count increases of many policies on the English Wikipedia, noting that though the word count of IAR had decreased, when including the supplemental page explaining it, this amounted to a 3600% increase in length since the rule's conception.

== Use in practice ==
A 2012 American Behavioral Scientist study analyzed the English Wikipedia's deletion process, "articles for deletion" (AfD). It found that IAR significantly impacted the weight of a comment: a page was more likely to be retained if a Wikipedia editor cited IAR in a "keep" vote, and more likely to be deleted if an editor cited IAR in a "delete" vote. The study also found that an article was more likely to be kept if the AfD contained a "keep" comment referring to both IAR and a "notability" policy (a rule on Wikipedia about which topics should have an article). This was not the case for "delete" comments. Additionally, if an administrator referred to IAR in favor of deletion then the article was more likely to be kept. The study concluded that the rule acts by "strengthening the efficacy of the individual and diminishing that of the bureaucracy".

In Joseph M. Reagle Jr.'s 2010 book Good Faith Collaboration he writes that "ignore all rules" is "clever" and has substance of merit, but it "is bound to require qualification", such as that found in the essay "What 'Ignore All Rules' Really Means". McGrady proposed that Wikipedia's "Gaming the System" guideline is a better way to convey the spirit of Wikipedia than IAR. The former guideline forbids users from purposefully misinterpreting Wikipedia's policies in order to undermine their intent, an action referred to as "gaming". McGrady criticizes that IAR is "too abstract and too often misinterpreted or misused, itself a constant subject of gaming".

In his 2015 book Wikipedia and the Politics of Openness, Nathaniel Tkacz writes that despite the policy, "ignoring the rules in Wikipedia is not an effective strategy if a contributor wants his or her contribution to stick". Tkacz goes on to say that "Wikipedia does have firm rules", but that they "are not fixed for all time".

In a criticism of Wikipedia's bureaucracy, Dariusz Jemielniak writes that the rule is "knocked over in practice", noting that there are many essays on the site which explain when to use the rule. Jemielniak recommends that a "bureaucracy-busting squad" should be founded to "actively use and educate about" the rule. David Auerbach of Slate similarly writes that "ignore all rules" is hypocritically used by Wikipedia editors to "prevail in debates".

== See also ==
- Red tape
- Letter and spirit of the law
- Shuhari
