= Digital Universe =

2006 online information service

- Website type: Internet portal
- Available in: English
- Headquarters: Scotts Valley, California
- Owner: Digital Universe Foundation
- Website: www.digitaluniverse.net
- Commercial: no
- Registration: Optional

Digital Universe was a free online information service founded in 2006. Subject matter experts were to have been responsible for reviewing and approving content; contributors were to have been both experts (researchers, scholars, educators) and the public.

The project was founded in 2005 by Joe Firmage, CEO of ManyOne, with Bernard Haisch as the president. It launched in early 2006. Larry Sanger was a director, and helped with the launch of the project's Encyclopedia of Earth. Sanger left in late 2006 to launch Citizendium. The digitaluniverse.net website was working in January 2019 but was nonfunctional later that year.

== Characteristics ==
=== Two-tiered system ===
According to Sanger, the expert wiki was expected to be written and managed by experts, while the public wiki was expected to be editable by members of the educated public. Only registered users who had provided their real names would be permitted to edit the wiki. According to Sanger, an article rating system would be used for articles in the public wiki.

=== Content ===
Around 2000 content pages existed as of August 2007. The Digital Universe claims the following featured portals: Earth, Energy, The Arctic, Texas Environment, U.S. Government, and Salton Sea.

The Earth portal is working on an Encyclopedia of Earth (EoE), which will focus on the natural environment and its interaction with society. It will limit editing privileges to experts, by attributing all edits to their authors, by changes being published publicly only after approval and by using an expert-developed taxonomy for articles.

EoE will use two parallel wikis, one "Stewarded", one "Public". The Stewarded wiki will be open only to "recognized scientific authorities" after their credentials have been reviewed. The EoE runs MediaWiki wiki software. EoE is to use the Creative Commons Attribution-ShareAlike 2.5 for its license. Over 400 articles had been written by experts by January 2006.

== Development ==
Principals of the Digital Universe project include Joe Firmage, USWeb founder; astrophysicist Bernard Haisch, president of the Digital Universe Foundation, and Larry Sanger. On 14 March 2006, the Digital Universe Foundation announced that Lawrence Lessig, Founder and Chairman of the Creative Commons Project, had joined the Digital Universe advisory board.

In September 2006, Sanger announced that he had taken a "leave of absence" from Digital Universe "in order to set up a fully independent Citizendium Foundation". In 2011 it was reported that he had said that the Encyclopedia of Earth was the only thing that remained from his involvement in the foundation.

== Funding ==
In July 2006, the San Jose Mercury News reported that "Digital Universe, a non-profit based in Scotts Valley, is part of a complicated three-organization structure. ManyOne Networks is the for-profit arm of the operation, backed with angel investors and private investor funding that is developing the Digital Universe software. Its profits are funneled to the ManyOne Foundation, set up in Canada for tax purposes and to give the project a less U.S.-centric feel. Eventually, the foundation will acquire ManyOne Networks by buying out the investors at a fixed rate of return, Haisch said. The Digital Universe Foundation controls the content that is published online. It will issue grants to academics and researchers to produce work for the Web site. The plan is to create a self-sustainable organization through a mix of grants and revenue from premium services, such as high-resolution images and video and e-mail, with prices ranging from $7.95 to $49.95."

As of January 2006, US$10.5 million had been raised from investors and foundations for the Digital Universe project. ManyOne Networks plans to offer premium services for $7.95 a month and to sell Internet access. These revenues will be used in part to support the Digital Universe project. Firmage has stated that access to the basic Digital Universe content will always remain free and without advertisements.

== Reaction ==
In January 2006, the pilot version of Digital Universe was launched. This contained approximately 50 portals. Some visitors felt this version was confusing and difficult to navigate. Aaron Barlow, an associate professor at New York City College of Technology, wrote that "the problem with this, from a horizontal point of view, is that important work that really should be part of the education of the individual is moved to the "experts" who provide the gatekeeping. A neterate person should know how to negotiate the web for accurate information without need of a guide; providing guides may only prevent people from being fully able to manage the Web for themselves."

== See also ==
- List of online encyclopedias
