= Magdy Kharoshah =

Egyptian forensic pathologist

- Born: August 17, 1967 (age 59); Cairo, Egypt
- Education: Cairo University (1991)
- Occupations: Forensic pathologist, Forensic medical examiner
- Known for: Editor-in-Chief of the Egyptian Journal of Forensic Sciences

Magdy Kharoshah (born August 17, 1967) is an Egyptian forensic pathologist who is forensic medical examiner at the Bahrain Defense Force Hospital and the Military Court, Bahrain Royal Medical Services, Bahrain, and Editor-in-Chief of the Egyptian Journal of Forensic Sciences.

== Education ==
Kharoshsh, after graduating from the Cairo University, Faculty of Medicine in 1991, served as a forensic medical examiner at the Forensic Medicine Authority, Ministry of Justice, Egypt and at the Forensic Medicine Center in Dammam, Saudi Arabia in various capacities.

== Career ==
In 2012, he was elected Vice President of the International Association of Law and Forensic Sciences. In 2014, he was elected as a Fellow of the Faculty of Forensic and Legal Medicine of the Royal College of Physicians, London.

In 2011, Kharoshsh founded the Egyptian Journal of Forensic Sciences, now published by Springer Open, and was appointed as Editor-in-Chief. Since then, as EIC, he elevated the journal to new heights in terms of its rating and impact factor.
