= Nupedia =

Predecessor of Wikipedia (2000–2003)

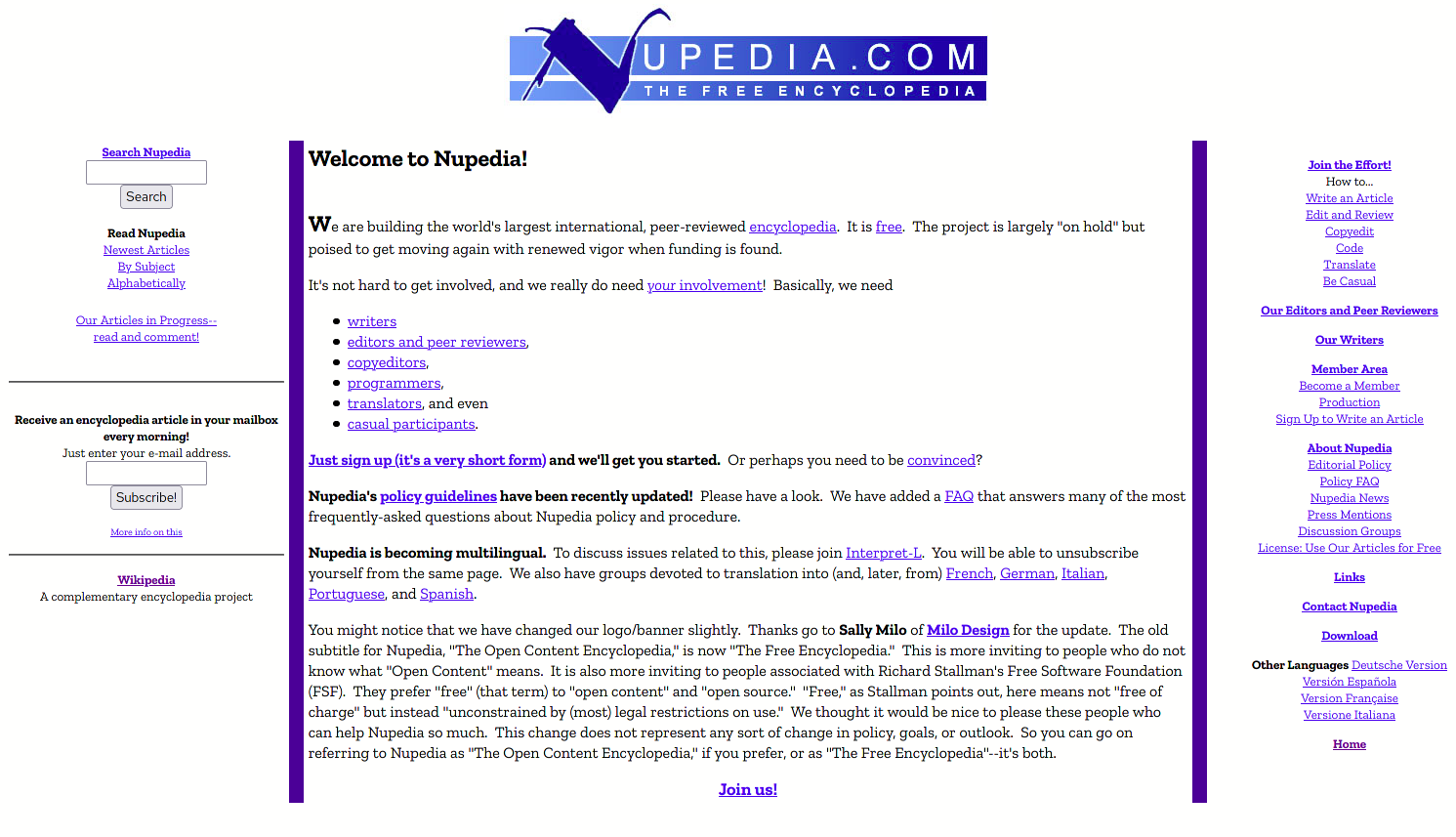
- Screenshot from the Wayback Machine
- Website type: Online encyclopedia
- Available in: English; German; Spanish; French; Italian
- Founded: March 9, 2000
- Dissolved: September 26, 2003
- Successor: Wikipedia
- Owner: Bomis (formerly)
- Creators: Jimmy Wales; Larry Sanger
- Website: nupedia.org www.nupedia.com at the Wayback Machine (archived 8 August 2003) www.nupedia.com at the Wayback Machine (archived 7 April 2000)
- Launched: 9 March 2000; 26 years ago

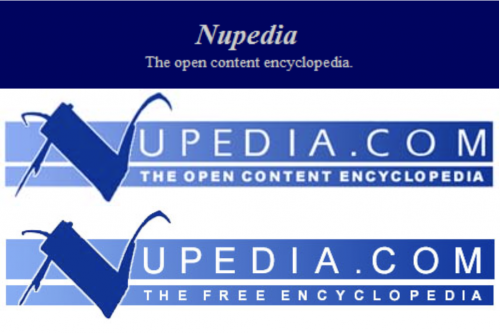
All three logos used by Nupedia. The first logo was used from March to August 2000, the second from August 2000 to February 2001, and the third from February 2001 to its closing in September 2003.

Nupedia was a multi-language online encyclopedia whose articles were written by volunteer contributors with relevant subject-matter expertise, reviewed by expert editors before publication, and licensed as free content. It was founded by Jimmy Wales and underwritten by Bomis, with Larry Sanger as editor-in-chief. Nupedia operated from March 2000 until September 2003. It is best known today as the predecessor of Wikipedia. Nupedia had a seven-step approval process to control content of articles before being posted, rather than live wiki-based updating. Nupedia was designed by a committee of experts who predefined the rules. It had 21 articles in its first year, (Note: Wikipedia:Nupedia and Wikipedia § Articles copied to Wikipedia) compared with Wikipedia having 200 articles in the first month, and 18,000 in the first year.

Unlike Wikipedia, Nupedia was not a wiki; it was instead characterized by an extensive peer-review process, designed to make its articles of a quality comparable to that of professional encyclopedias. Nupedia wanted scholars (ideally with PhDs) to volunteer content. Before it ceased operating, Nupedia produced 24 approved articles that had completed its review process and another 150 articles were in progress. Wales preferred Wikipedia's easier posting of articles, while Sanger preferred the peer-reviewed approach used by Nupedia and later founded Citizendium in 2006 as an expert-reviewed alternative to Wikipedia.

== History ==
In October 1998, Jimmy Wales began thinking about an online encyclopedia built by volunteers and, he hired Larry Sanger to oversee its development in January 2000. The project officially went online on 9 March 2000. By November 2000, only two full-length articles had been published.

From its beginning, Nupedia was a free content encyclopedia, with Bomis intending to generate revenue from online ads on Nupedia.com. Initially, the project used a homegrown license, the Nupedia Open Content License. In January 2001, it switched to the GNU Free Documentation License at the urging of Richard Stallman and the Free Software Foundation, who had proposed the identically licensed GNE encyclopedia in December 2000. Also in January 2001, Nupedia started Wikipedia as a side-project to allow collaboration on articles before entering the peer review process. This attracted interest from both sides, as it provided the less bureaucratic structure favored by advocates of the GNE encyclopedia. As a result, GNE never really developed, and the threat of competition between the projects was averted. As Wikipedia grew and attracted contributors, it quickly developed a life of its own and began to function largely independently of Nupedia, although Sanger initially led activity on Wikipedia by virtue of his position as Nupedia's editor-in-chief.

Besides leading to discontinuation of the GNE project, Wikipedia also led to the gradual demise of Nupedia. Due to the collapse of the internet economy at that time, Jimmy Wales decided to discontinue funding for a salaried editor-in-chief in December 2001, and Sanger resigned from both projects shortly thereafter. After Sanger's departure, Nupedia increasingly became an afterthought to Wikipedia; of the Nupedia articles that completed the review process, only two did so after 2001. As Nupedia dwindled into inactivity, the idea of converting it into a stable version of approved Wikipedia articles was occasionally broached, but never implemented. Nupedia's server crashed in September 26, 2003. Nupedia's encyclopedic content was assimilated into Wikipedia.

== Editorial process ==
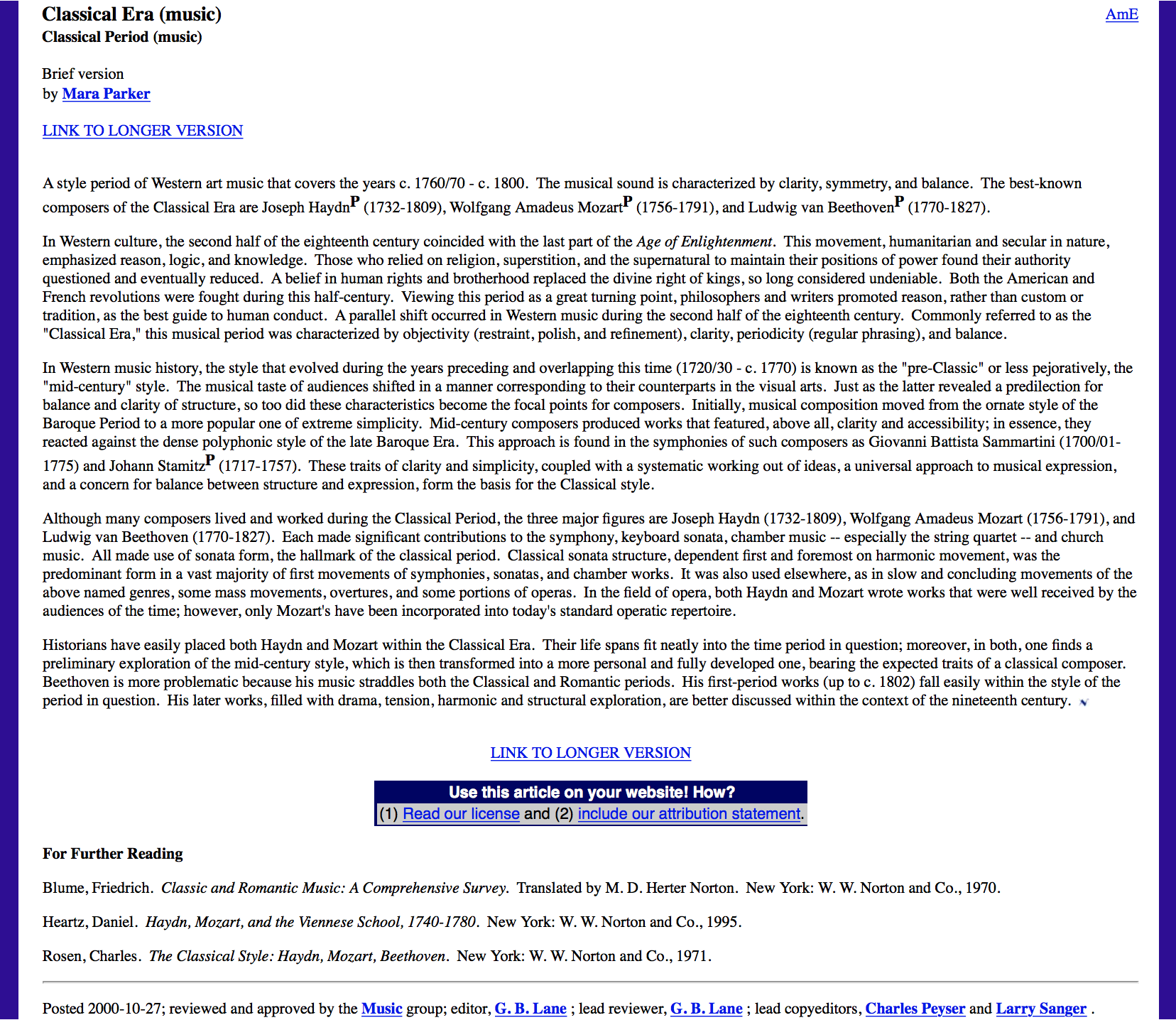
A Nupedia article on the classical era of music

Nupedia had a seven-step editorial process, consisting of:

1. Assignment
2. Finding a lead reviewer
3. Lead review
4. Open review
5. Lead copyediting
6. Open copyediting
7. Final approval and markup

Authors were expected to have expert knowledge (although the definition of expert allowed for a degree of flexibility, and it was acknowledged that some articles could be written by a good writer, rather than an expert per se) and the editors approving articles for publication were expected "to be true experts in their fields and (with few exceptions) [to] possess PhDs".

Ruth Ifcher was someone Sanger depended upon and worked closely with on Nupedia's early policies and procedures. Ifcher, holding several higher degrees, was a computer programmer and former copy editor and agreed to be volunteer chief copy editor.

== Software development ==
Nupedia was powered by NupeCode collaborative software. NupeCode is free/open source software (released under the GNU General Public License) designed for large peer review projects. The code was available via Nupedia's CVS repository.

As part of the project, a new version of the original software (called "NuNupedia") was under development. NuNupedia was implemented for testing at SourceForge, but never reached a sufficient stage of development to replace the original software.

== Decline and closure ==
Despite operating for approximately three years, Nupedia published a relatively small number of articles. Its server crashed in September 2003 and was never restored, effectively bringing the project to an end. At the time, it had completed 24 distinct topics, represented by 27 published article entries, including shorter and longer versions of some articles.

The following is the complete list of approved article entries, in their original publication order:

1. Atonality (brief version)
2. Hydatius (brief version)
3. The Donegal Fiddle Tradition (brief version)
4. Irish Traditional Music (brief version)
5. Atonality (longer version)
6. Classical Era (Music) (longer version)
7. Classical Era (Music) (brief version)
8. Charles Sanders Peirce (brief version)
9. Herodotus of Halicarnassus (brief version)
10. SNOBOL 4 Programming Language (brief version)
11. Vergil (brief version)
12. Procopius of Caesarea (brief version)
13. Pylos (brief version)
14. Case-based reasoning (brief version)
15. Theory of computation (brief version)
16. New Zealand (brief version)
17. Karl Raimund Popper (brief version)
18. Functional programming (brief version)
19. Genotype and Phenotype (brief version)
20. Plasmids (medium-length)
21. Polymerase chain reaction (brief version)
22. Foot-and-mouth disease (brief version)
23. Polymerase chain reaction (longer version)
24. Imperative programming (brief version)
25. Quasispecies model (brief version)
26. Bacteria (brief version)
27. Source code (brief version)

== See also ==
- List of online encyclopedias
- List of wikis
- Encyclopedia Britannica
- Scholarpedia
