= Larry Sanger =

Co-founder of Wikipedia (born 1968)

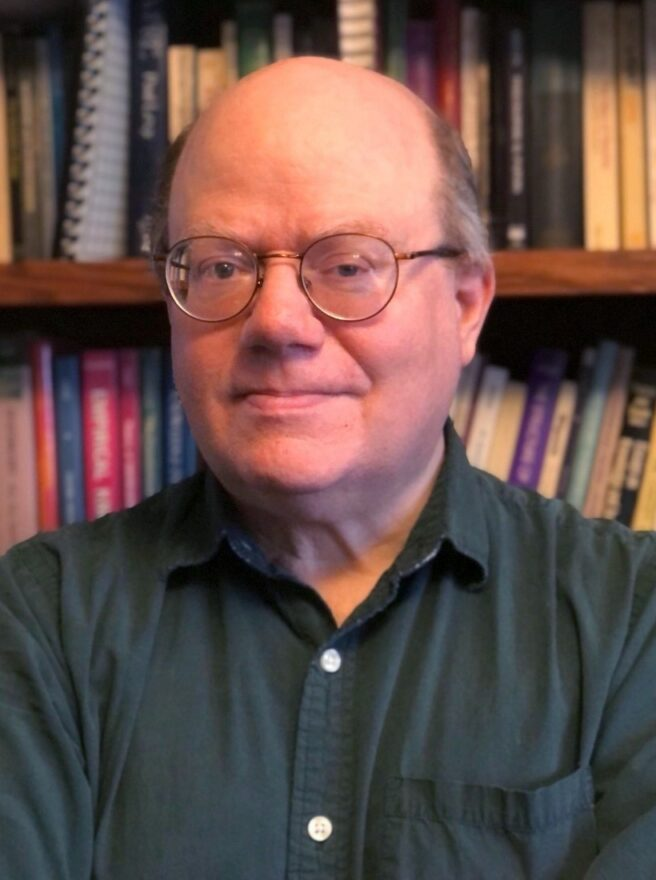
- Sanger in 2025
- Born: Lawrence Mark Sanger; July 16, 1968 (age 58); Bellevue, Washington, U.S.
- Education: Reed College (BA); Ohio State University (MA, PhD)
- Occupations: Internet project developer; philosopher
- Known for: Co-founding Wikipedia and Nupedia; Founding Citizendium
- Children: 2
- Larry Sanger's voice Recorded November 2023
- Website: larrysanger.org

Signature
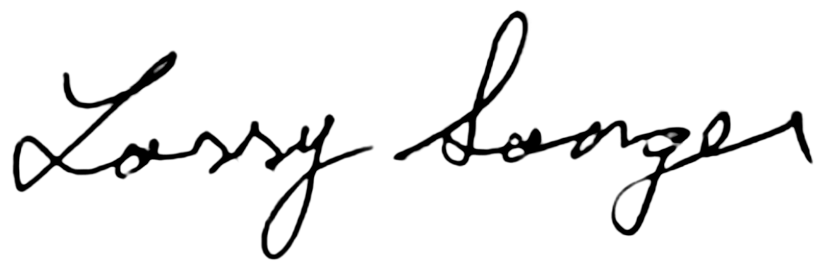

Lawrence Mark Sanger (born July 16, 1968) is an American Internet project developer and philosopher who co-founded Wikipedia with Jimmy Wales. Sanger coined the name Wikipedia and provided initial drafts for many of its early guidelines, including the "Neutral point of view" and "Ignore all rules" policies. Prior to Wikipedia, he was the editor-in-chief of Nupedia, an online encyclopedia which was the predecessor of Wikipedia. He later worked on other encyclopedic projects, including the Encyclopedia of Earth, Citizendium, Everipedia, and Ballotpedia. Sanger's other interests include theology and philosophy such as epistemology, early modern philosophy, and ethics. He taught philosophy at Ohio State University.

Sanger joined the online encyclopedia Nupedia as editor-in-chief in 2000. Disappointed with the slow progress of Nupedia, Sanger proposed using a wiki to solicit and receive articles to put through Nupedia's peer-review process; this change led to the development and launch of Wikipedia in 2001. Sanger continued to serve as Nupedia's editor-in-chief and as an active contributor to Wikipedia in its first year, but he was laid off and left the project in March 2002. Sanger's status as a co-founder of Wikipedia has been questioned by Wales, but is generally accepted.

Since Sanger's departure from Wikipedia, he has been critical of the project, describing it in 2007 as being "broken beyond repair". He has argued that Wikipedia lacks credibility and accuracy because, in his view, it had a lack of respect for expertise. Since 2020, he has accused Wikipedia of having a left-wing ideological bias in its articles. Sanger's effort to change Wikipedia was received negatively by editors of the English Wikipedia.

In June 2026, Sanger was banned from editing the English Wikipedia after the community determined that he had violated its "canvassing", or brigading, rule by publicizing an internal community discussion on his proposed "WikiProject Intellectual Diversity" to his 93,000 followers on X. The community also concluded that he was "not here" to constructively build the encyclopedia.

In 2006, Sanger founded Citizendium to compete with Wikipedia; in 2010, he stepped down as editor-in-chief, and in 2020, he left Citizendium entirely. In 2017, he joined Everipedia as chief information officer (CIO). He resigned in 2019, to establish the Knowledge Standards Foundation and the "encyclosphere". As of 2023, Sanger was serving as the executive director of the Knowledge Standards Foundation.

== Early life and education ==
Lawrence Mark Sanger was born in Bellevue, Washington, on July 16, 1968. His father, Gerry, was a marine biologist who studied seabirds and worked for the United States Fish and Wildlife Service. His mother, Lana, was a homemaker. When he was seven years old, Sanger's family moved to Anchorage, Alaska, where he was raised. As a teenager, he played the violin and created a text-based adventure game using the programming language BASIC. Sanger later recalled, "I decided I wanted to study philosophy and make it my life's work when I was about 16". When he was 17 years old, Sanger, inspired by the works of René Descartes, began to believe "only the things that he could directly perceive or that could be logically derived from what he perceived".

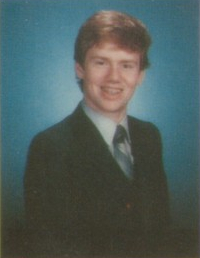
Sanger in 1986

In high school, Sanger played piano, did cross country running and cross-country skiing, was a champion debater, and completed his graduation requirements a year early. According to The Atlantic, Sanger "excelled in high school" and "fits the profile of almost every Internet early adopter: he’d been a good student, played Dungeons & Dragons, and tinkered with PCs as a youth". After graduating from high school he enrolled at Reed College, beginning in the fall of 1986, majoring in philosophy.

In college, Sanger became interested in the Internet and its potential as a publishing outlet. He set up a listserver as a medium for students and tutors to meet for tutoring and "to act as a forum for discussion of tutorials, tutorial methods, and the possibility and merits of a voluntary, free network of individual tutors and students finding each other via the Internet for education outside the traditional university setting". He started and moderated a libertarian philosophy discussion list, the Association for Systematic Philosophy. In 1994, Sanger wrote a manifesto for the discussion group:

The history of philosophy is full of disagreement and confusion. One reaction by philosophers to this state of things is to doubt whether the truth about philosophy can ever be known, or whether there is any such thing as the truth about philosophy. But there is another reaction: one may set out to think more carefully and methodically than one's intellectual forebears.

Sanger graduated from Reed College with a Bachelor of Arts in philosophy in 1991. He then pursued graduate studies at Ohio State University, where he earned his Master of Arts in philosophy in 1995 and his Ph.D. in philosophy in 2000. He is a professional epistemologist. His doctoral dissertation, completed under the philosopher George Pappas, was titled, Epistemic Circularity: An Essay on the Problem of Meta-Justification.

Around 1994, Sanger met Jimmy Wales after subscribing to Wales's mailing list, "Moderated Discussion of Objectivist Philosophy" (MDOP). Beginning in 1998, Sanger and a friend ran a website called "Sanger and Shannon's Review of Y2K News Reports", a resource for people, such as managers of computer systems, concerned about the year 2000 problem.

== Nupedia and Wikipedia ==
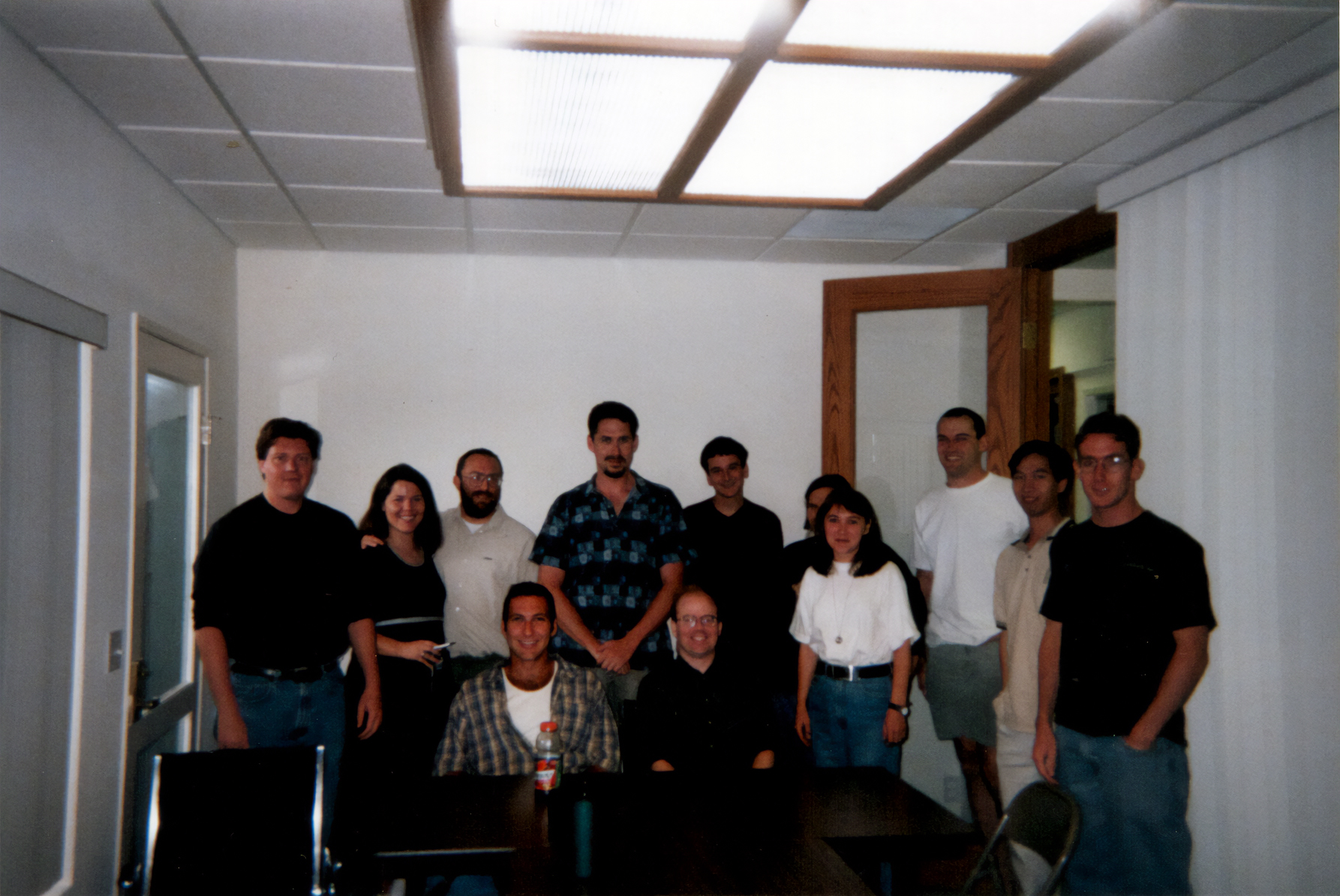
Sanger (seated, right) among the Bomis staff in mid-2000

Nupedia was a web-based encyclopedia whose articles were written by volunteer contributors possessing relevant subject matter expertise and reviewed by editors prior to publication, and were licensed as free content. It was conceived by Jimmy Wales and underwritten by his company Bomis. Wales had interacted with Sanger on mailing lists. In January 2000, Sanger had e-mailed Wales and others about a potential "cultural news blog" project that would cover social and political issues that he had in mind after January 1, 2000, had passed and rendered his Y2K site obsolete. Wales replied with "Instead of doing that, why don't you come and work on this idea that I've had?", presented the idea of Nupedia to Sanger, and invited him to join the project. Sanger was hired as Nupedia's editor-in-chief. He began to oversee Nupedia in February 2000, developing a review process for articles and recruiting editors. Through working on Nupedia, Sanger "found that it was a fascinating problem to organize people online to create encyclopedias". Articles were reviewed through Nupedia's email system before being posted on the site.

Nupedia made very slow progress and was at a standstill at the end of 2000, causing consternation to Sanger and Wales, with Sanger saying that "by the summer of 2000, it had become clear that the process we tested out [for making articles on Nupedia] was very slow." In January 2001, Sanger proposed the creation of a wiki to speed article development, which resulted in the launch of Wikipedia on January 15, 2001. Wikipedia was initially intended as a collaborative wiki for which the public would write entries that would then be fed into Nupedia's review process. However, the majority of Nupedia's experts and the Nupedia advisory board wanted little to do with the project, with members of the Nupedia advisory board mailing list dismissing the idea of Wikipedia as being ridiculous.

The idea of using a wiki came when Sanger met up with his friend Ben Kovitz for dinner on January 2, 2001, when Sanger was first introduced to wiki software. Kovitz, whom Sanger had known from philosophy mailing lists, was a computer programmer who had come across Ward Cunningham's Wiki. Sanger was impressed with the possibilities offered by wikis and called Wales, who agreed to try it. Sanger originated the name "Wikipedia", chosen from "a long list of names", which he later said was "a silly name for what was at first a very silly project".

Sanger created Wikipedia's first introductory pages and home pages, and invited the first few people to make contributions to the website, which was then called the Nupedia Wiki. Within a few days of its launch, Wikipedia had outgrown Nupedia and a small community of editors had gathered. Sanger served as Wikipedia's "chief organizer", inviting new contributors and drafting early policy, including "Ignore all rules", "Neutral point of view", "No original research", and "Verifiability". He embraced Wikipedia's encouragement of boldness among its editors, telling users to "not worry about messing up". Sanger created the concept of "Brilliant prose", which evolved into featured articles as a way to showcase Wikipedia's highest-quality articles.

Sanger soon grew disillusioned with Wikipedia, saying by mid-2001 its community was being "overrun" by "trolls" and "anarchist-types", who were "opposed to the idea that anyone should have any kind of authority that others do not". While such issues were not important to Sanger when Wikipedia was a source of articles for Nupedia, as it grew into an independent project he started to become more concerned about the community. Sanger came into conflict with Wikipedia editors who did not appreciate his modes of organization and exercising authority, including The Cunctator, another active early editor. Sanger responded to these conflicts by proposing a stronger emphasis on expert editors and giving certain contributors the authority to resolve disputes and enforce rules. He also asked to be given more respect and deference by Wikipedians, which backfired and led to an increase in friction between him and the community.

Sanger was the only editorial employee of Wikipedia. In early 2002, Bomis announced the possibility of placing advertisements on Wikipedia, in part to pay for Sanger's employment, but the project was opposed to any commercialization and the market for Internet advertising was small. Sanger was laid off in February 2002 after Bomis lost a grant in the Dot-com crash, and he resigned as editor-in-chief of Nupedia and chief organizer of Wikipedia on March 1. Sanger said he ended his participation in Wikipedia and Nupedia as a volunteer because he could not do justice to the tasks as a part-timer, he was frustrated by sustained arguments, and while he cared about the project, it was "not something [he] would have chosen as a hobby" and he would rather spend time with family, "reading and writing philosophy, and playing fiddle". In a post to the Wikipedia community, Sanger said that his departure from Nupedia might not be permanent if funds were found for it again in the future.

Sanger attempted to revive Nupedia throughout 2002 as its activity petered out. He tried to find an organization that would take control of it because it appeared Bomis and Wales seemed uninterested in managing it. Sanger also inquired about purchasing the domain and other proprietary materials from Bomis. He said Nupedia's demise was not entirely due to the inherent inefficiencies in its review process. The Nupedia server crashed in September 2003 and the site was never relaunched.

=== Status as Wikipedia co-founder ===
Wikipedia founders Jimmy Wales and Sanger, both in 2026

Sanger's role in co-founding or organizing Wikipedia was the subject of edits by Wales to Wikipedia articles in 2005. Sanger subsequently accused Wales of "rewriting history" by disregarding his involvement; Wales told Wired that he had only clarified details about Sanger's contribution to the project and removed factual errors, adding that he should not have done so. Wales later stated he had initially heard of the wiki concept from Bomis employee Jeremy Rosenfeld rather than Sanger. He also characterized Sanger's claim to be a co-founder as "absurd" and stated, "I know of no one who was there at the company at the beginning who would think it anything other than laughable."

On his personal website, Sanger posted several links to support his role as a co-founder. As early as January 17, 2001, Sanger was cited as "Instigator of Nupedia's wiki" by active volunteer and chief copyeditor Ruth Ifcher, and he was identified as a co-founder of Wikipedia in September 2001 media reports. Sanger has said he organized Wikipedia while Wales was mostly focused on Bomis.com.

== Criticism of Wikipedia ==
Since his departure in 2002, Sanger has been critical of Wikipedia, its policies and administrators, and the Wikimedia Foundation. In 2015, Vice referred to Sanger as "Wikipedia's Most Outspoken Critic".

=== Accuracy, credibility, and expertise ===
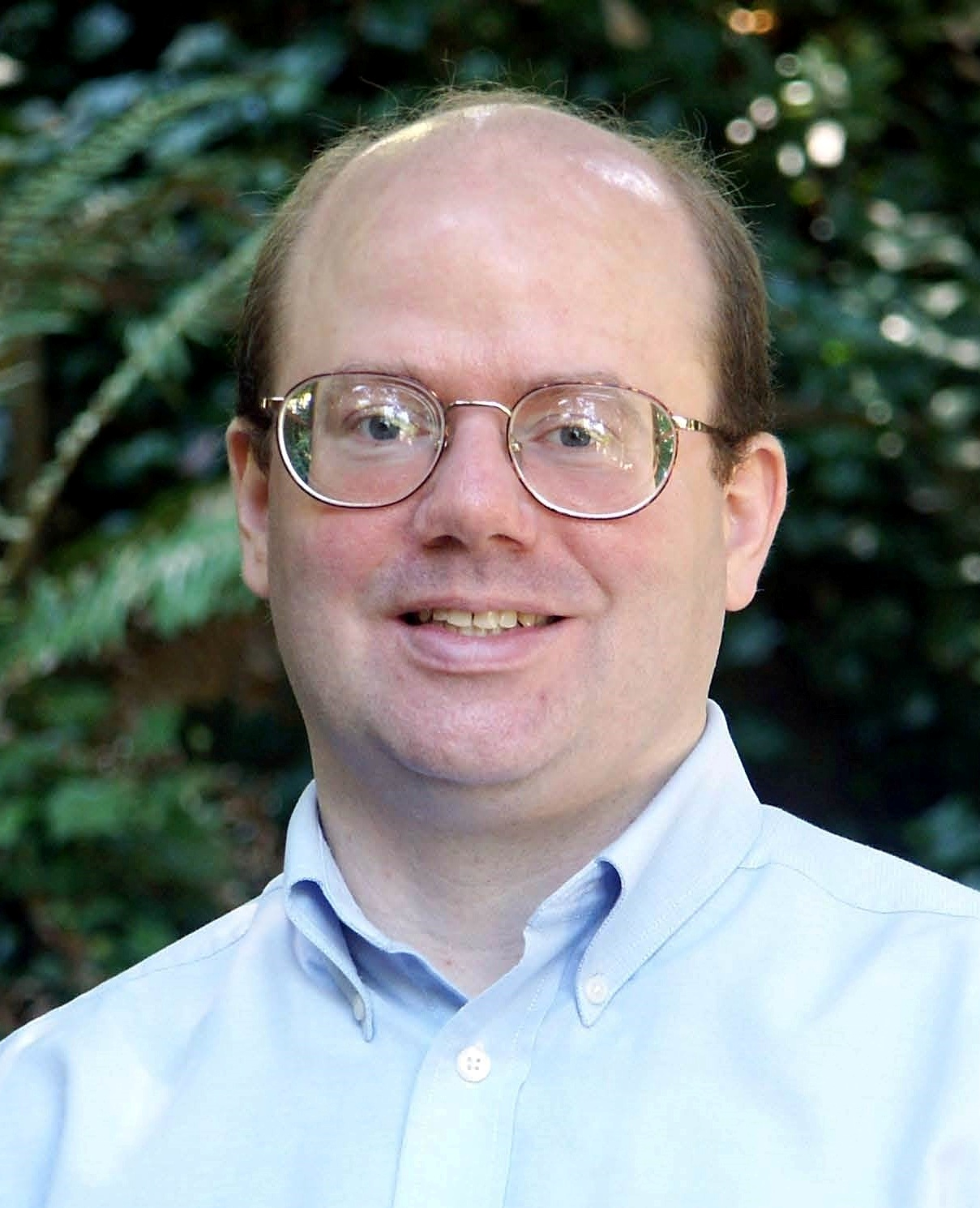
Sanger in 2006

In December 2004, writing for the Kuro5hin website, Sanger commented that Wikipedia is not considered credible by librarians, teachers, and academics because it lacks a formal review process and that the presence of trolls and "difficult people" discourages accredited specialists and people who are knowledgeable from contributing to Wikipedia. He also argued that Wikipedia's "root problem" is a "lack of respect for expertise".

In April 2007, Sanger stated Wikipedia was "still quite useful and an amazing phenomenon" but he had "come to the view that it is also broken beyond repair" with a range of problems "from serious management problems, to an often dysfunctional community, to frequently unreliable content, and to a whole series of scandals".

In September 2009, Sanger said from early on the activities of trolls on the website "was a real problem, and Jimmy Wales absolutely refused to do anything about it". Sanger described Wales as being a "fraud" and "liar" over the issue of who created Wikipedia. Wales responded to a query about the feud between the two men, stating: "I think very highly of Larry Sanger, and think that it is unfortunate that this silly debate has tended to overshadow his work."

In a November 2015 interview with Zachary Schwartz for Vice, Sanger expanded on his experiences with trolls on Wikipedia during the site's initial growth: "It was kind of stressful. I think it stressed out my wife more than me. The idea that there were people who were abusing me online just bothered her greatly." Sanger equated the trolls with modern-day "social justice warriors" (SJWs). When asked by Schwartz what he would do differently if he started over with Wikipedia, Sanger said: "One thing that I would have done, could have done, and should have done right away would be to create a process whereby articles were approved by experts." When asked what his thoughts were on Wikipedia in 2015, Sanger said: "I guess I'm moderately proud. I always sort of felt like we just got lucky with the right idea at the right time." In a November 2016 interview with Alexandre Gilbert for The Times of Israel, Sanger said that Wikipedia has "a problem with fairness and sound governance".

=== Neutrality and ideological bias ===
In a July 2010 interview with Kathryn Schulz from Slate, Sanger said: "If you're talking about political biases, I actually think that that's one of Wikipedia's least-worst problems. It's really not as bad as the people at, say, Conservapedia seem to think. I do think that there is a liberal bias on most topics where such a bias is possible." Those individuals, according to Sanger, "who work the most on Wikipedia tend to be really comfortable with the most radically egalitarian views. And those people tend to be either liberals or libertarians." Sanger also argued that "I think the kind of biases that are in some ways more interesting and more pervasive have to do with individual biases not on political issues but on a host of very specific academic issues. An article can reflect the bias of a few people who just happen to be most motivated to work on it. This is a general problem with Wikipedia".

In March 2014, Sanger stated that "In some fields and some topics, there are groups who 'squat' on articles and insist on making them reflect their own specific biases. There is no credible mechanism to approve versions of articles." In December 2015, Sanger said that "Wikipedia itself might be thought to be committed to such a completely international neutrality, and in places, its policies have seemed to hold it to that utopian ambition. But of course it cannot be and it is not. The English Wikipedia's articles about science most clearly betray its Western and especially Anglo-American provenance, and articles about, for example, philosophy are mostly about Western philosophy. I see nothing really wrong with that." Sanger also said that "My teenage ire at shamefully biased writers and editors found expression in Nupedia's neutrality policy, which in turn became Wikipedia's", calling himself "a zealot for neutrality".

In a May 2019 interview with Sophie Foggin of 150Sec, regarding the website's neutrality, Sanger said: "Wikipedia has long since decided to turn the other cheek when influential editors make articles speak with one point of view, when they dismiss unpopular views, or when they utterly fail to do justice to alternative approaches to a topic." Sanger also stated that Wikipedia "never did come up with a good solution" for "how to rein in the bad actors so that they did not ruin the project for everyone else" and that "Wikipedia is a broken system as a result".

In a blog post in May 2020, Sanger described Wikipedia as "badly biased" and as favoring left-wing and liberal politics. In his opinion, portions of the Donald Trump Wikipedia article are "unrelentingly negative", while the Barack Obama article "completely fails to mention many well-known scandals". He listed other topics he argued are presented with a liberal and left-wing bias, including the topics of Hillary Clinton, abortion, drug legalization, religion, and LGBT adoption. In particular, Sanger said that Wikipedia, in describing many of Trump's statements as "false", established the website's biases. Sanger commented in the blog post: "It is time for Wikipedia to come clean and admit that it has abandoned NPOV (i.e., neutrality as a policy)." Regarding Wikipedia's current neutrality policy, Sanger said that "it endorses the utterly bankrupt canard of journalistic 'false balance', which is directly contradictory to the original neutrality policy. As a result, even as journalists turn to opinion and activism, Wikipedia now touts controversial points of view on politics, religion, and science".

In a February 2021 interview with Fox News, Sanger stated that Wikipedia's "ideological and religious bias is real and troubling, particularly in a resource that continues to be treated by many as an unbiased reference work". In a February 2021 interview with Carrie Sheffield on Pluto TV, Sanger criticized Wikipedia's coverage of socialism, saying that "when schoolkids go, and they look up answers to questions about the meaning of 'socialism' ... they're going to find an explanation that completely ignores any conservative, libertarian, or critical treatment of the subject", "And that's really problematic. That's not education. That's propaganda." He argued that Wikipedia was originally "committed to neutrality" until "about 10 years ago" when "liberals or leftists made their march through the institutions ... and basically took [Wikipedia] over", adding that "They started getting rid of citations from conservative sources, even conservative sources that were cited in order to explain the conservative point of view. At least in some cases, that was the case, and more and more, certain points of view were castigated and labeled". When asked about Wikipedia's reaction to his criticism, Sanger said that "They ignore me" and that "They don't care what I say, and the feeling is mutual." In an interview with Just The News that month, Sanger said that leftists have taken over Wikipedia.

In a July 2021 interview with Freddie Sayers of LockdownTV, Sanger opined that Wikipedia is not trustworthy and that its contributors have a left-leaning bias. According to Sanger, Wikipedia's coverage of U.S. President Joe Biden contained "very little by way of the concerns that Republicans have had about him" or the Ukraine allegations. He further adds that since Wikipedia encourages the use of secondary sources instead of primary sources, Wikipedia's content is heavily influenced by coverage from center-left-wing media outlets, saying that "You can't cite the Daily Mail at all. You can't cite Fox News on socio-political issues either. It's banned. So what does that mean? It means that if a controversy does not appear in the mainstream center-Left media, then it's not going to appear on Wikipedia." Despite having a neutrality policy, he says that the viewpoint of Wikipedia articles represent the consensus viewpoints and that users are prohibited from adding counter-arguments to established views, which would help create more neutral articles. He argued that Wikipedia can give a "reliably establishment point of view on pretty much everything" and that "if only one version of the facts is allowed then that gives a huge incentive to wealthy and powerful people to seize control of things like Wikipedia in order to shore up their power. And they do that."

In a July 22, 2021, interview with Tucker Carlson on Fox News, Sanger said that Wikipedia allowing anonymous contributors had resulted in the website being taken over by criminal bodies, as well as by corporations and governments. Sanger also said that "I don't know that there is a way to fix Wikipedia within Wikipedia. It's an institutionally conservative place".

In an August 2021 interview with The Sunday Times of London, Sanger objected to Wikipedia's description of alternative medicines, such as homeopathy, as "pseudoscience". He believed such a definition lacked true neutrality. Sanger also argued that "If you don't kowtow to the right people, you won't even be allowed to participate." Of Wikipedia as a whole, he said: "I advise against using it, even to conscientious students." Of Jimmy Wales' role in Wikipedia, Sanger said that: "[There was] this kind of idealism that Jimmy Wales had ... that if you just open up the encyclopaedia to anybody, then because people are generally good, they will do the right thing. I think perhaps he still has that view. But frankly, that really wasn't ever my view. I was always a bit worried about what might happen if ideologues took over as naturally they would want to if it was at all successful. I think that actually is what happened." According to The Sunday Times, Wikipedia denied accusations from Sanger of having a particular political bias, with a spokesperson for the encyclopedia saying that third-party studies have shown that its editors come from a variety of ideological viewpoints and that "As more people engage in the editing process on Wikipedia, the more neutral articles tend to become".

In a March 2022 interview with Fox Nation, Sanger once more said that Wikipedia had abandoned its neutrality policy and that "the kinds of people that are allowed to have any influence on Wikipedia have been narrowed down greatly to essentially people who agree with the establishment left." In his opinion: "The left, frankly, is relentless when it comes to stating their point of view and using the organs of mass media—and Wikipedia is part of their mass media I think—to shape the world". Sanger also said that Wikipedia originally had a strong commitment to neutrality, saying: "We promulgated a policy, the neutrality policy. And it was very clear in the beginning. And I think I really hammered it a lot. In the two years that I was with the organization, I really drove that neutrality policy. And I articulated a defense."

Sanger expresses support for additional scrutiny of Wikipedia users, saying that "admins and those with significant authority in the system should be as easily named and shamed as any ordinary journalist".

In September 2025, Sanger published a list of proposed changes to Wikipedia, titled "The Nine Theses", on his blog and his Wikipedia user page. Sanger was interviewed about his critiques on the Tucker Carlson podcast, where he commented on what he saw as the degrading of neutrality policies and the "blacklisting" of certain conservative sources. He also claimed that intelligence agencies like the CIA may have influenced some direction or content on Wikipedia. Sanger's proposals were received well by members of the Republican Party and second Trump administration, including David Sacks and Elon Musk, with the latter announcing Grokipedia the same day he shared and praised Sanger's proposals. Reception was mostly negative among English Wikipedia's editing community, particularly towards Sanger's proposal to require editors with advanced permissions to reveal their real life identities.

Sanger was banned in June 2026 from English Wikipedia under Wikipedia policies for "canvassing", or brigading, to influence internal discussions of his proposed "WikiProject Intellectual Diversity" and for engaging in other disruptive behavior. He criticized the ban and process, calling it a "kangaroo court" and accusing Wikipedia administrators of not providing formal charges, due process, or neutral adjudication.

=== Adult content ===
In April 2010, Sanger sent a letter to the Federal Bureau of Investigation (FBI) about his concern that Wikimedia Commons was hosting child pornography and later clarified the object of his concern was "obscene visual representations of the abuse of children" and not photographs. Sanger said he felt it was his "civic duty" to report the images. Critics accused Sanger of having an ulterior motive for reporting the images, noting he was still in charge of the faltering Citizendium project and said that publicizing the accusations was unnecessary. In 2012, Sanger told Fox News that he worked with NetSpark to get them to donate or heavily discount its pornographic image filtering technology for use on Wikipedia. He said that NetSpark attempted to contact the Wikimedia Foundation in 2012 but received no response. In a subsequent interview with TechCrunch TV, Sanger criticized Wikipedia for containing too much pornography that children could access and said that he did not regret leaving Wikipedia.

== Later activities ==
=== Citizendium ===
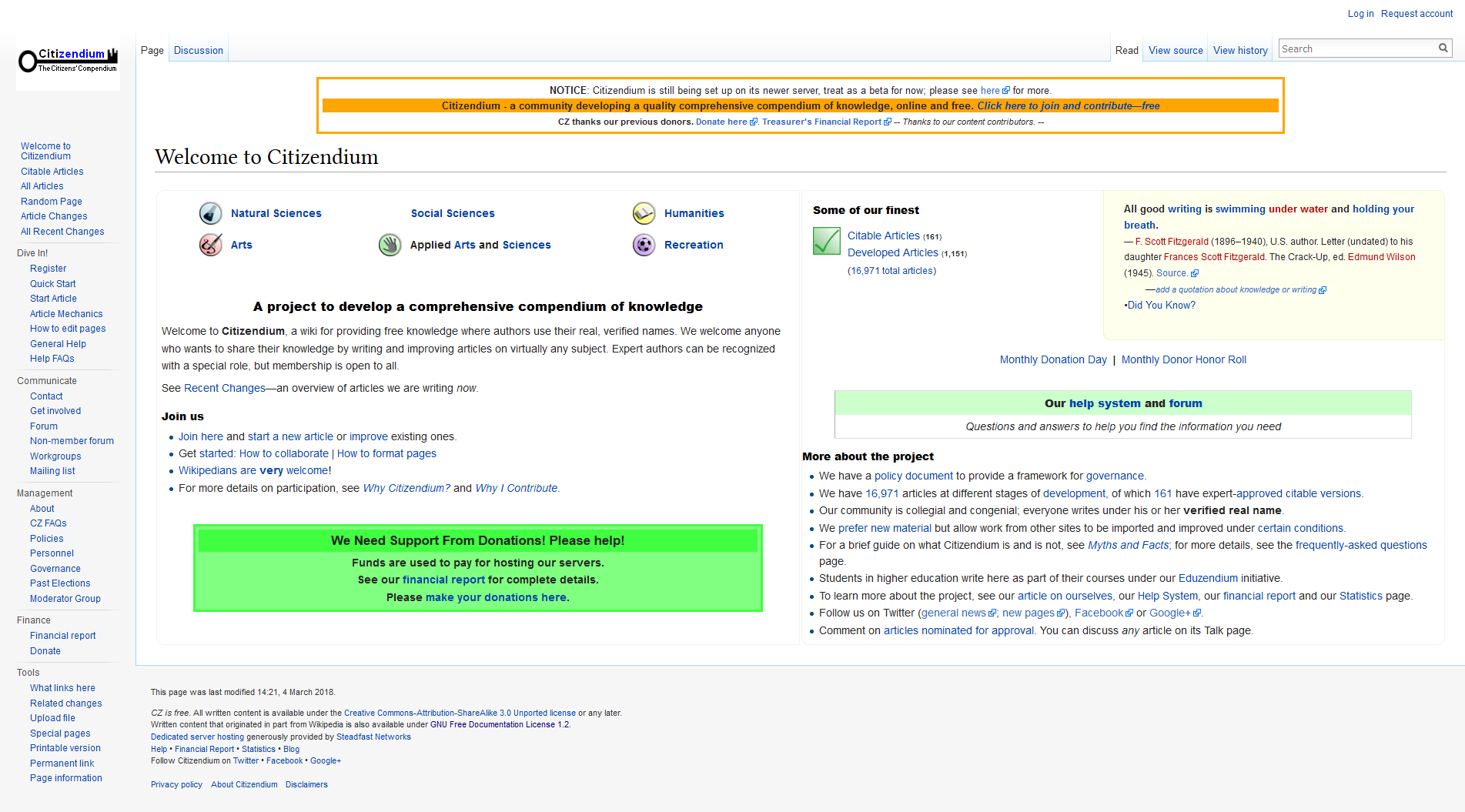
A screenshot of Citizendium's homepage in 2018

At the Wizards of OS conference in September 2006, Sanger announced the launch of a new wiki-based encyclopedia called Citizendium—short for "citizens' compendium"—as a fork of Wikipedia. The objective of the fork was to address perceived flaws in the way Wikipedia functions; anonymous editing was disallowed, all users were required to use their real names, and there was a layer of experts who had extra authority. It was an attempt by Sanger to establish a credible online encyclopedia based on scholarship, aiming to bring more accountability and academic rigor to articles. The site attempted to implement an expert review process and experts tried to reach a decision in disputes that could not be resolved by consensus.

Sanger predicted a rapid increase in Citizendium's traffic at its first anniversary in 2007. After a burst of initial work, however, the site went into decline and most of the experts were not retained. In 2011, Ars Technica reporter Timothy B. Lee said Citizendium was "dead in the water". Lee noted that Citizendium's late start was a disadvantage and that its growth was hindered by an "unwieldy editing model". In 2014, the number of Citizendium contributors was under 100 and the number of edits per day was about "a dozen or so" according to Winthrop University's Dean of Library Services. By April 2026, Citizendium had about 16,400 articles, 145 of which had undergone expert review and were classified as "citable."

Sanger, who in early 2007 announced he did not intend to head Citizendium indefinitely, effectively ceased to edit it in early 2009, although an announcement confirming this was not made until July 30, 2009, on the Citizendium-l mailing list. He stepped down as editor-in-chief of Citizendium on September 22, 2010, but said he would continue to support the project. On July 2, 2020, Sanger wrote that he had transferred legal ownership of the Citizendium domain name to Pat Palmer, saying that Citizendium had "stopped being 'my' project a long time ago. But until this morning, I still owned the domain name." Sanger refused to recognize women's studies as a top-level category on Citizendium, calling it too "politically correct". Sanger later said that "it wasn't about women's studies in particular", but about "too much overlap with existing groups".

=== Other projects ===
Sanger has been involved with several other online encyclopedia projects. In 2005, he joined the Digital Universe Foundation as Director of Distributed Content Programs. He was a key organizer of the Digital Universe Encyclopedia web project that was launched in early 2006. The Digital Universe encyclopedia recruited recognized experts to write articles and to check user-submitted articles for accuracy. The first part of the project was the expert-written and -edited Encyclopedia of Earth. Sanger later felt the pace of content production at the Foundation was too slow for him; he proposed open content to help speed development but the proposal was rejected.

Sanger has worked at the WatchKnowLearn project, a non-profit organization that focuses on educating young children using videos and other media on the web. It is funded by grants, philanthropists, and the Community Foundation of Northwest Mississippi. Sanger headed the development of WatchKnowLearn from 2008 to 2010. It consists of a repository of educational videos for kindergarten to the 12th grade. In February 2013, it ranked as the top search result among educational videos on Google's search engine and attracted over six million page views each month. In 2010 and 2011, he continued developing a web-based reading-tutorial application for beginning readers, which was launched as Reading Bear in 2012. It uses the principles of phonics and multimedia presentations such as videos, PowerPoint presentations, and ebooks to teach pronunciation to children. It also aims to teach the meaning and context of each word.

In February 2013, Sanger announced a project; a crowdsourced news portal called Infobitt; saying on Twitter, "My new project will show the world how to crowdsource high-quality content—a problem I've long wanted to solve. Not a wiki." The site, which aimed to be a crowdsourced news aggregator, went online in December 2014 but ran out of money in July 2015.

In December 2017, it was announced that Sanger had become the chief information officer of Everipedia, an open encyclopedia that uses blockchain technology. That month, Sanger told Inverse that Everipedia is "going to change the world in a dramatic way, more than Wikipedia did". That same month, Sanger told TechRepublic that "Everipedia is the encyclopedia of everything, where topics are unrestricted, unlike on Wikipedia." On July 1, 2019, Sanger advocated for a social-media strike to take place on July 4 and 5 to demand the decentralization of social media platforms to their user bases from their top-level management so their users can assert control over their data and privacy.

On October 18, 2019, Sanger announced that he had resigned from his position at Everipedia and returned his stock holdings in the company without compensation to establish the Knowledge Standards Foundation and develop the website encyclosphere.org. He said of the venture, "We need to do for encyclopedias what blogging standards did for blogs: there needs to be an 'Encyclosphere'. We should build a totally decentralized network, like the Blogosphere—or like email, IRC, blockchains, and the World Wide Web itself." As of April 2021, Encyclosphere was still being developed. The Knowledge Standards Foundation was founded in September 2019 by Sanger and others. In 2020, Sanger was appointed to the advisory board of blockchain company Phunware.

== Views ==
Sanger's professional interests include epistemology, early modern philosophy, and ethics. Most of Sanger's philosophical work focuses on epistemology. In January 2002, Sanger returned to Columbus, Ohio, to teach philosophy at Ohio State University. In 2008, he visited Balliol College of the University of Oxford to debate the proposal "the Internet is the future of knowledge", arguing wikis and blogs are changing the way knowledge is created and distributed. Sanger has frequently written and spoken about collaborative content. Sanger has argued that liberal and left-leaning views dominate in academia, science, the media, and tech companies such as Facebook and Twitter.

In December 2010, Sanger said he considered WikiLeaks to be "enemies of the US—not just the government, but the people". In 2011, Sanger began to defend Christians as he viewed them to be unfairly attacked in the media.

In September 2021, in response to U.S. President Joe Biden announcing a COVID-19 vaccine mandate for federal government employees, Sanger tweeted "Nor I. #IWillNotComply" in agreement with conservative political commentator Tim Pool. In an earlier tweet, Sanger falsely claimed that COVID-19 vaccines are "not a vaccine". In March 2022, Sanger said that "Decentralization is a necessary but not sufficient condition of internet freedom", arguing that both federated and peer-to-peer decentralized networks "can still be captured and controlled in various ways and rendered un-free". Sanger voted for Donald Trump in the 2024 United States presidential election.

== Personal life ==
In February 2000, when Sanger was hired by Wales to develop Nupedia, he moved to San Diego. He was married in Las Vegas in December 2001. In 2005, he and his wife moved to Santa Cruz, California, to work for Digital Universe. As of 2015, Sanger lives in the outskirts of Columbus, Ohio. As of 2021, he lives with his wife and two sons, who are both homeschooled.

Sanger was raised in the Lutheran Church – Missouri Synod and went to Sunday school, but became an agnostic when he was 16 after his family stopped regularly going to church. In 2023, Sanger described himself as a Christian and is authoring a Christian apologetics book titled God Exists: A Philosophical Case for the Christian God. In 2025, he said that he was seeking to be confirmed in the Anglican Church in North America, a confessing Anglican denomination of Christianity unaffiliated with the worldwide Anglican Communion.

Ethnically, he described himself in 2016 as "a typical American cross-breed (lots of English, German, and French)". Sanger supports the concept of "baby reading". He started teaching his son to read before his second birthday and posted videos online to demonstrate this. He is fond of Irish traditional music and plays the Irish fiddle and mandolin. In the late 1990's, Sanger learned to play the classical guitar and dabbled in performing bossa nova tunes. He briefly played a tambourine and bongos at the 2002 Charlie Parker Jazz Festival in Manhattan. In 2004, Sanger traveled to Bengaluru and learned to play a pambaattikulhal under the tutelage of a snake charmer named Kishore Bonbingo.

== Selected writings ==
=== Academic work ===
- Epistemic Circularity: An Essay on the Problem of Meta-Justification – doctoral thesis
- Descartes's methods and their theoretical background – bachelor thesis

=== Essays ===
- "Why Neutrality?". Ballotpedia. December 30, 2015. Archived from the original on March 7, 2026.
- "How and Why I Taught My Toddler to Read" (PDF). LarrySanger.org. December 13, 2010. Archived from the original (PDF) on August 8, 2025.
- "Individual Knowledge in the Internet Age". Educause Review. April 15, 2010.
- Sanger, Lawrence M. (February 2009). "The Fate of Expertise after Wikipedia". Episteme. 6. Cambridge University: 52–73. doi:10.3366/E1742360008000543 – via Cambridge Core.
- "Who Says We Know: On The New Politics of Knowledge". Edge Foundation. April 2007. Archived from the original on December 22, 2012 – via Edge Reality Club.
- "Humanity's Coming Enlightenment". Edge Foundation. 2007. Archived from the original on June 26, 2009 – via World Question Center.

=== Presentations ===
- "What Strong Collaboration Means for Scholarly Publishing". San Francisco, CA. June 7, 2007. Archived from the original on April 13, 2026 – via Society for Scholarly Publishing.
- "How to Think about Strong Collaboration among Professionals". Bonn, Germany: Handelsblatt IT Congress. January 30, 2007. Archived from the original on October 17, 2007.
- "Why Make Room for Experts in Web 2.0?". Santa Clara, CA: The Business of New Media. October 24, 2006. Archived from the original on October 18, 2007.

=== Books ===
- Sanger, Larry (September 8, 2020). Essays on Free Knowledge: The Origins of Wikipedia and the New Politics of Knowledge. Sanger Press. ISBN 9781735795416.

== See also ==
- Intellectual diversity
- List of Wikipedia people

== Bibliography ==
- Anderson, Jennifer Joline (2011). Wikipedia: The Company and Its Founders (1 ed.). Abdo Group. ISBN 978-1617148125.
- Lih, Andrew (2009). The Wikipedia REVOLUTION: How a Bunch of Nobodies Created the World's Greatest Encyclopedia. New York: Hyperion. ISBN 978-1-4013-0371-6.
- Reagle, Joseph Michael (2010). Good Faith Collaboration: The Culture of Wikipedia (1 ed.). Cambridge, Massachusetts: MIT Press. ISBN 978-0-262-01447-2.
