= Bernard Haisch =

German-born American astrophysicist and author (1949-2026)

- Born: Bernard Michael Haisch; 23 August 1949; Stuttgart
- Died: 3 September 2026 (aged 77)
- Occupation: Astrophysicist

Bernard Michael Haisch (23 August 1949 – 3 September 2026) was a German-born American astrophysicist who researched solar-stellar astrophysics, quantum electrodynamics (QED), observational X-ray and ultraviolet astronomy, and stochastic electrodynamics. Haisch, with Alfonso Rueda, developed a quantum vacuum inertia hypothesis proposing that the electromagnetic zero-point field contributes to inertial mass.

In 2002, Haisch became Chief Science Officer of ManyOne Networks. Since 2004, he has served as president of the Digital Universe Foundation, which aimed to create a peer-reviewed online encyclopedia as an alternative to Wikipedia. In 2006, Haisch published The God Theory: Universes, Zero-Point Fields and What's Behind It All, proposing that consciousness creates matter rather than vice versa, and that discoveries in quantum physics point to an underlying intelligence in the universe. Haisch attributed his spiritual interests to his studies at the Latin School of Indianapolis and the Saint Meinrad Seminary and School of Theology.

== Life and career ==
Haisch was born in Stuttgart, Württemberg-Baden, West Germany, on August 23, 1949; he spent a year in a minor seminary and earned a Ph.D. in astronomy from the University of Wisconsin–Madison in 1975. He then spent three years as a postdoctoral fellow at the Joint Institute for Laboratory Astrophysics at the University of Colorado at Boulder.

He worked at the Solar & Astrophysics Laboratory at Lockheed Martin in Palo Alto, California and as deputy director of the Center for Extreme Ultraviolet Astrophysics Laboratory at the University of California, Berkeley.

In 1999, Haisch founded the California Institute for Physics and Astrophysics in Palo Alto, California, an organization mainly devoted to studying the electromagnetic quantum vacuum and funded by private philanthropic money. The institute formerly employed five full-time physicists researching string theory, general relativity and stochastic electrodynamics. Haisch served as the institute's director from 1999 until 2002.

In 2002, Haisch became the Chief Science Officer of ManyOne Networks. From 2004, he also served as president of the now-defunct Digital Universe Foundation, which aimed to create a peer-reviewed alternative to English Wikipedia.

Haisch died on September 3, 2026, at the age of 77, after a several years-long battle with Parkinson's disease.

== Research ==
Haisch published over 130 scientific papers. He served as a scientific editor of the Astrophysical Journal from 1993 to 2002, and editor-in-chief of the Journal of Scientific Exploration from 1988 to 1999. He has been listed in American Men & Women of Science under general physics.

In the 1990s, Haisch and Alfonso Rueda developed a "quantum vacuum inertia" hypothesis responsible for mass. The inertialess "SHARP drive" in Arthur C. Clarke's 3001: The Final Odyssey was named for Andrei Sakharov, Haisch, Rueda, and Harold E. Puthoff.

In 2006, he proposed that quantum fields that pervade all of space could give rise to consciousness in systems of sufficient complexity, a view inspired in part by the ideas of physicist Roger Penrose.

== Theological and philosophical writings ==
Haisch was a Catholic seminarian in the past. Haisch's writings on science and theology propose that scientific and spiritual worldviews can be reconciled through an understanding of the universe as both physical and conscious. His 2006 book The God Theory: Universes, Zero-Point Fields, and What's Behind It All presented a model in which consciousness is a fundamental aspect of reality rather than an accidental byproduct of matter.

In the follow-up, The Purpose-Guided Universe: Believing in Einstein, Darwin, and God (2010), Haisch argues for a synthesis of scientific discovery and spiritual understanding, maintaining that belief in a universal intelligence is compatible with evolutionary and cosmological science. Reviewer Julia Ann Charpentier described the book as “an enlightening exploration of creation and the human being’s existence on Earth” that bridges the perceived gap between religion and science.

Haisch's works often explored ideas related to panpsychism and the fine-tuning of physical constants, engaging with debates about the role of consciousness in the cosmos and the philosophical implications of quantum physics.

== Selected publications ==
- Haisch, Bernard (2010). The Purpose-Guided Universe: Believing in Einstein, Darwin, and God. York Beach, ME: Red Wheel/Weiser Books. ISBN 978-1601632777.
- Haisch, Bernard (2006). The God Theory: Universes, Zero-point Fields, And What's Behind It All. York Beach, ME: Red Wheel/Weiser Books. ISBN 1-57863-374-5.
- Haisch, B.; Strong, K.T.; Rodono, M. (1991). "Flares on the Sun and other stars". Annual Review of Astronomy & Astrophysics. 29: 275–324. Bibcode:1991ARA&A..29..275H. doi:10.1146/annurev.aa.29.090191.001423.
- Haisch, B.; Schmitt, J.H.M.M.; Fabian, A.C. (1992). "Disappearance of coronal X-ray emission in stars with cool dense winds". Nature. 360 (6401): 239. Bibcode:1992Natur.360..239H. doi:10.1038/360239a0.
- Haisch, B.; Antunes, A.; Schmitt, J.H.M.M. (1995). "Solar-like M-class X-ray flares on Proxima Centauri observed by the ASCA satellite". Science. 268 (5215): 1327–9. Bibcode:1995Sci...268.1327H. doi:10.1126/science.268.5215.1327. PMID 17778978. S2CID 46660210.
- Haisch, B.; Rueda, A.; Puthoff, H. E. (1994). "Inertia as a zero-point-field Lorentz force". Physical Review A. 49 (2): 678–694. Bibcode:1994PhRvA..49..678H. doi:10.1103/PhysRevA.49.678. PMID 9910287.
- Haisch, Bernard; Rueda, Alfonso (1998). "Contribution to inertial mass by reaction of the vacuum to accelerated motion". Found. Phys. 28 (7): 1057–1108. arXiv:physics/9802030. Bibcode:1998physics...2030R. doi:10.1023/A:1018893903079. S2CID 15176550.
- Haisch, Bernard; Rueda, Alfonso (21 September 1999). "Toward an Interstellar Mission: Zeroing in on the Zero-Point-Field Inertia Resonance". AIP Conference Proceedings. 504: 1047–1053. arXiv:physics/9909043. doi:10.1063/1.1290904. S2CID 118870412.
- Haisch, Bernard; Rueda, Alfonso; Dobyns, York (2001). "Inertial mass and the quantum vacuum fields". Annalen der Physik. 10 (5): 393–414. arXiv:gr-qc/0009036. Bibcode:2001AnP...513..393H. doi:10.1002/1521-3889(200105)10:5<393::AID-ANDP393>3.0.CO;2-Z.
- Haisch, Bernard (2001). "Freeing The Scientific Imagination". Ions Noetic Sciences Review. 57: 24.
- Haisch, Bernard; Rueda, Alfonso (2005). "Gravity and the Quantum Vacuum Inertia Hypothesis". Annalen der Physik. 14 (8): 479–498. arXiv:gr-qc/0504061. Bibcode:2005AnP...517..479R. doi:10.1002/andp.200510147. S2CID 14283455.
- Deardoff, J.; Haisch, B.; Puthoff, H. E. (2005). "Inflation-Theory Implications for Extraterrestrial Visitation" (PDF). Journal of the British Interplanetary Society. 58: 43–50. Bibcode:2005JBIS...58...43D. Archived from the original (PDF) on 2009-09-16.
