= Nathaniel Tkacz =

Swedish-Australian scholar

Nathaniel Tkacz PhD
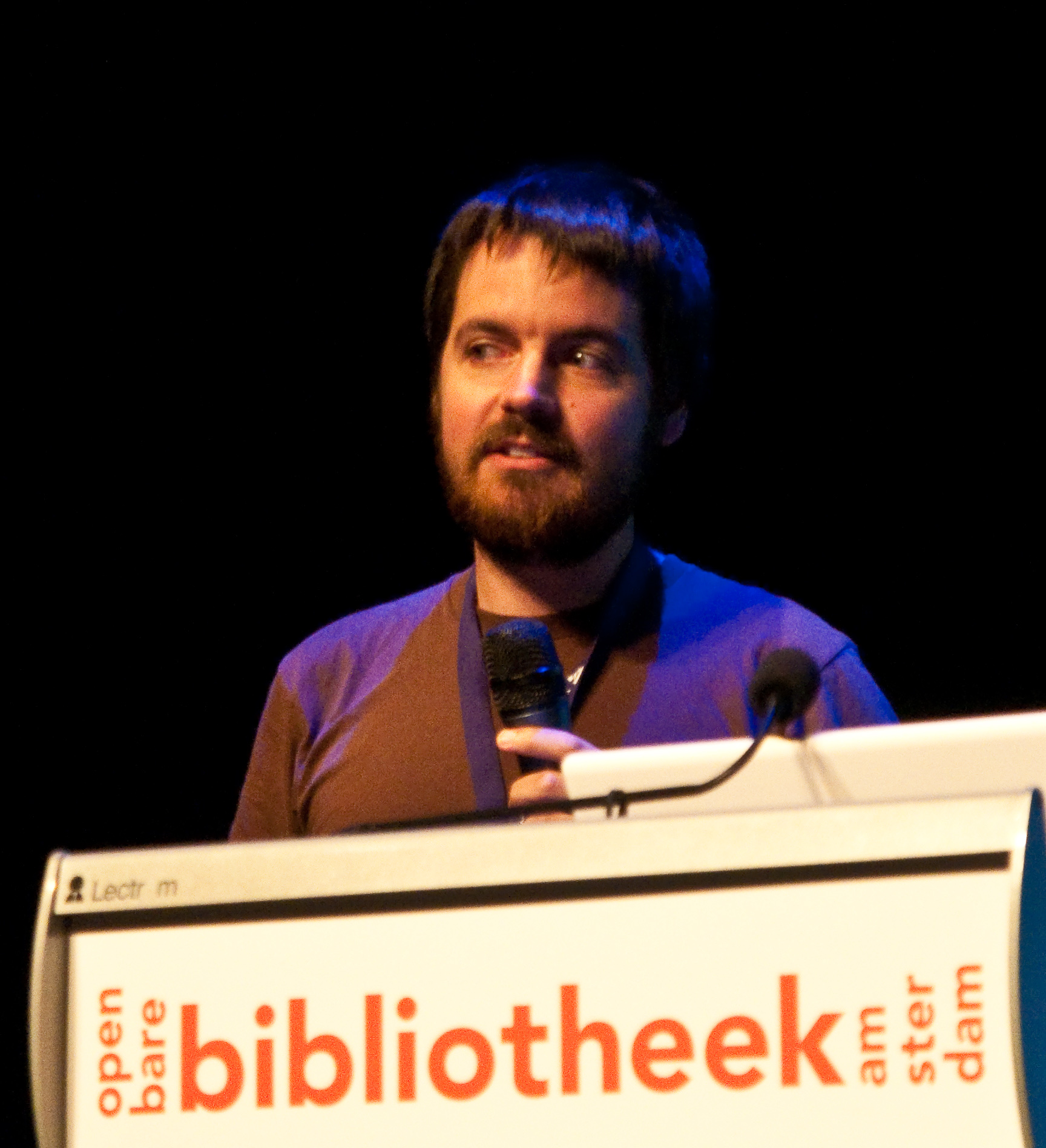
- Nathaniel Tkacz at the Wikipedia Conference, 2010
- Education: University of Melbourne (PhD)
- Scientific career
- Fields: Internet studies, cultural studies
- Workplaces: University of Warwick

Nathaniel Tkacz is a Swedish-Australian scholar of digital media who is currently Reader at the University of Warwick. His research on Wikipedia has been influential in media studies and organisational theory. Tkacz has described his work as investigating "the political, economic and organisational dimensions of technology, with a specific focus on networked and digital forms".

== Education and academic career ==
Tkacz has bachelor's degrees in arts and commerce from Monash University and a PhD in culture and communication from The University of Melbourne. He is currently Reader at the Centre for Interdisciplinary Methodologies at the University of Warwick, where he has worked since 2012.

== Research on Wikipedia ==
Tkacz's research on Wikipedia has been influential in the fields of internet research and digital media studies.

His monograph Wikipedia and the Politics of Openness (2015) has been cited in over 200 scholarly articles and books. In the book Tkacz argues that the openness of Wikipedia in allowing anybody to edit articles is countered by a "closure" where community debates determined what is excluded from the encyclopaedia. Two controversies are analysed: the deletion of an article about an artistic project, and the debate over whether to include images of Muhammed on Wikipedia. As Johan Söderberg wrote in a review of the book for the journal Science, Technology and Human Values, Tkacz's point is not that Wikipedia enthusiasts should be reprimanded for being insufficiently open. Tkacz's point is the opposite: openness always and inevitably presupposes closeness." In another review, Fabio Rojas notes that Tkacz contributes to institutional logic theory by developing the idea of forking in software development to apply to organisations. Rojas sees this combination of a cultural studies approach with organisational theory as being particularly useful. The book received a number of other positive reviews, including in Times Higher Education.

Regarding the "Ignore all rules" policy, he writes that despite the policy, "ignoring the rules in Wikipedia is not an effective strategy if a contributor wants his or her contribution to stick". Tkacz goes on to say that "Wikipedia does have firm rules", but that they "are not fixed for all time".

In 2021, Tkacz was awarded an Australian Research Council Discovery Grant with two collaborators: Heather Ford (the project leader) and Tamson Pietsch. The project is titled Wikipedia and the nation’s story: Towards equity in knowledge production, and aims to understand how Wikipedia "produces knowledge in its coverage of Australian historic events". The project is funded from 2022 through 2024.

== Research on data and dashboards ==
Tkacz's other main research area is data studies, which has culminated in his book Being With Data: The Dashboarding of Everyday Life, published by Polity Press in 2022. He has argued for a situated approach to studying data, which has been described as part of a "growing range of methods used to study data practices in situ and as they affect the operation of data in everyday and organisational contexts", and as exploring how "data ‘intervene’ in the unfolding of actual decision-making processes".

== Selected publications ==
- Being With Data: The Dashboarding of Everyday Life (Polity Press, 2022)
- Critical Point of View: A Wikipedia Reader. Institute of Network Cultures, Amsterdam, 2011. (Edited with Geert Lovink) ISBN 978-90-78146-13-1
- Wikipedia and the Politics of Openness. University of Chicago Press, 2015. ISBN 9780226192277
