= Wizards of OS =

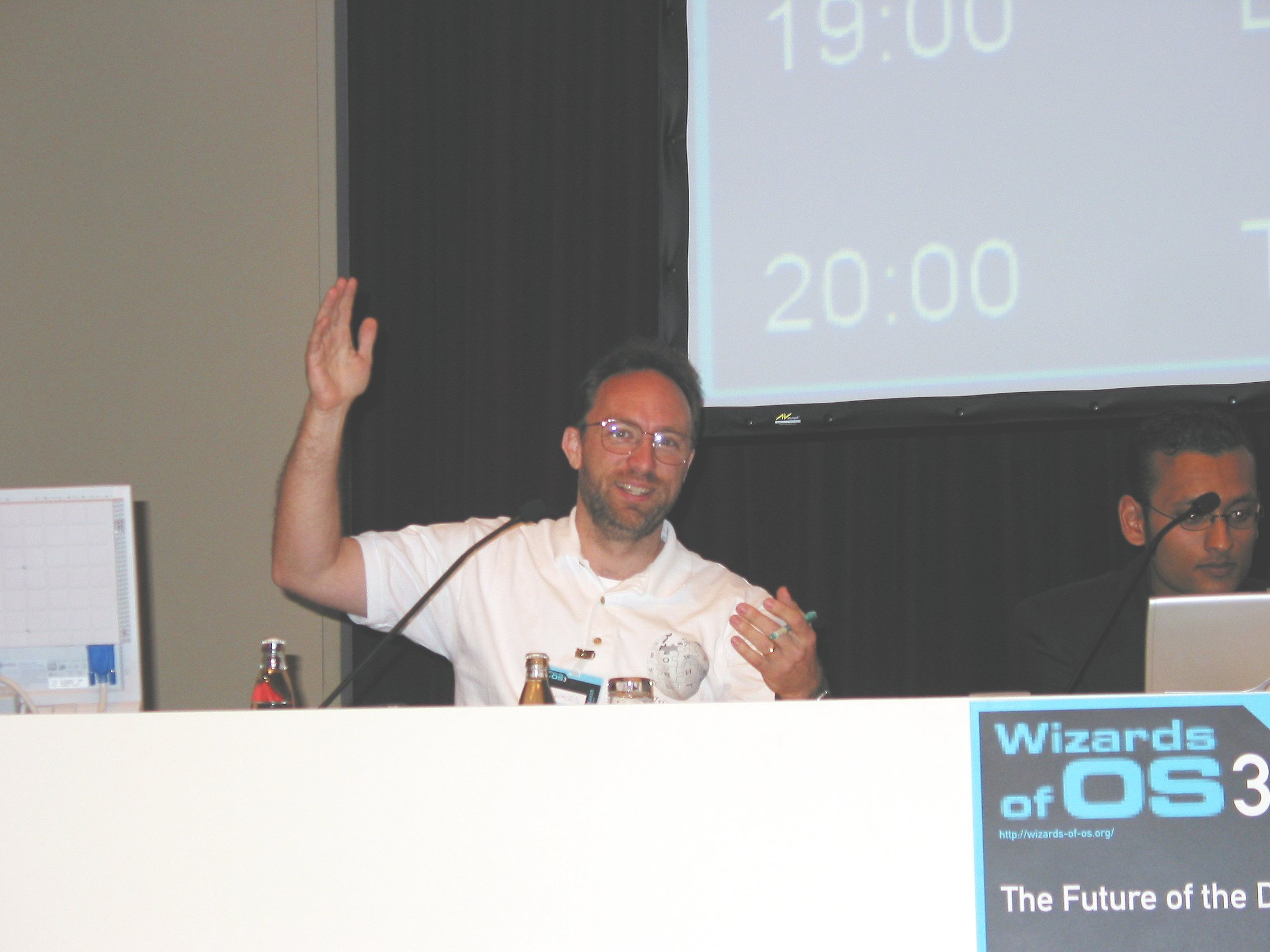
Jimmy Wales at WOS3 in 2004

Wizards of OS (Wizards of Operating Systems, or "WOS") was a semi-annual Berlin-based conference that was held four times between 1999 and 2006. Its topics were the cultural and political potentials of free software, software technology, digital networks and media, and more generally information freedom and open cooperation in the creation and proliferation of knowledge. The conference was interdisciplinary, and included among its attendees scientists, engineers, social researchers, scholars from the humanities, artists and activists.

The name was a word play on The Wizard of Oz. The acronym "OS" stands for operating system (not open source).

== Individual conferences ==
The first Wizards of OS conference took place in 1999.

The third conference took place in 2004, with the subtitle "The Future of the Digital Commons". It featured, among others, the launch of the German translation of the Creative Commons licenses.

Wizards of OS 4 took place from September 14 to September 16, 2006, with the subtitle "Information Freedom Rules". Some of the topics were the future of Creative Commons, open music and the compensation of artists and European copyright legislation. Larry Sanger announced an initial proposal of his project Citizendium.
