= Egyptian Journal of Forensic Sciences =

- Discipline: Forensic science
- Language: English
- Edited by: Magdy Kharoshah

Publication details
- History: 2011–present
- Publisher: SpringerOpen on behalf of the International Association of Law and Forensic Sciences
- Frequency: Continuous
- Open access: Yes
- Impact factor: 1.9 (2025)

Standard abbreviations
- ISO 4: Egypt. J. Forensic Sci.

Indexing
- ISSN: 2090-536X (print); 2090-5939 (web)
- OCLC no.: 840056407

Links
- Journal homepage; Online access

The Egyptian Journal of Forensic Sciences is a peer-reviewed open access scientific journal covering forensic sciences published by Springer Nature and is an official publication of the International Association of Law and Forensic Sciences. The journal was established in January 2011 and until 2016 published by Elsevier. All issues pertaining to this period are available through ScienceDirect. Since January 2017, the journal is published by SpringerOpen. The editor-in-chief is Magdy Kharoshah.

== Abstracting and indexing ==
The journal is abstracted and indexed in Scopus. and Science Citation Index.

According to the Journal Citation Reports 2025 released in June 2026, the journal has an impact factor of 1.9. The journal has been ranked in MEDICINE, LEGAL (Q2), and LAW (Q1) - ESCI category.
