= Ealing Independent College =

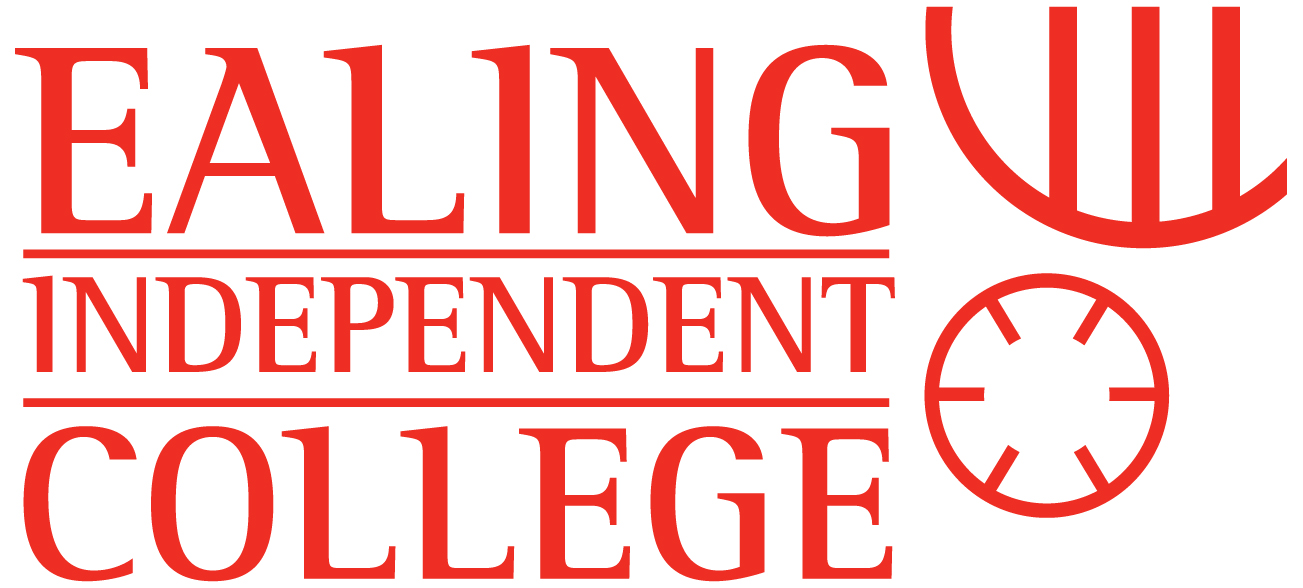

Location
- 83 New Broadway; Ealing; London, W5 5AL; England; 51.512362°N 0.308286°W

Information
- Type: Private school, Secondary school
- Established: 1992
- Local authority: London Borough of Ealing
- Department for Education URN: 133444 Tables
- Ofsted: Reports
- Principal: Allan Cairns
- Gender: Mixed
- Age: 13 to 19
- Enrolment: 150
- Website: http://www.ealingindependentcollege.com/

Ealing Independent College is an independent college in West London, located in the borough of Ealing in London.

== History ==
Ealing Independent College was founded in 1992, then named Ealing Tutorial College. It moved to its current premises, close to Ealing Town Hall in 1996. In 1998 the college started to offer GCSE and A-Level retakes, and in 2002 Dr Ian Moores took over as Principal. The college was inspected by Ofsted in 2010 and was rated 'Outstanding' for its quality of teaching and assessment. The college was acquired by Bellevue Education in 2015.

The parent company is Bellevue Education International Limited.
