= Engineering School of the University of Caen Normandy =

Coordinates: 49°38′02″N 1°38′40″W

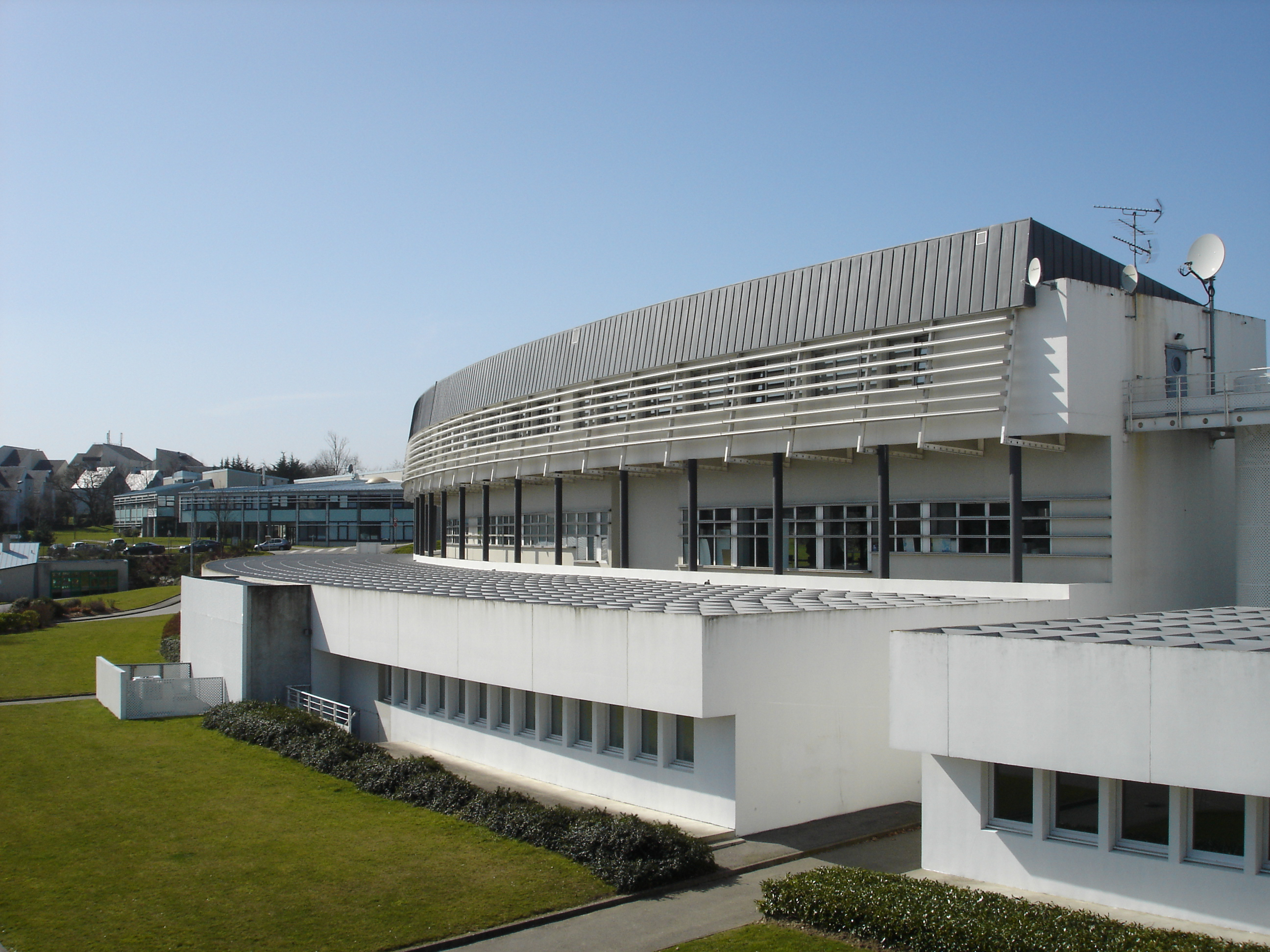
Picture of the school in Cherbourg-Octeville

The Engineering School of the University of Caen Normandy (in French: ESIX Normandie, before EIC - École d'Ingénieurs de Cherbourg) is a French engineering university funded in 1993.

It is situated in Normandy in two cities: Caen and Cherbourg.

The school is accredited by the "Commission des titres d'ingénieur" to deliver Engineering Degrees.

== Teaching ==
The school has three departments:

- Food Sciences;
- Industrial Systems Engineering (industrial production or nuclear operations);
- Mecatronics.

== International relations ==
The school has agreements allowing students to attend semester(s) in foreign countries:

- In Austria:
  - Fachhochschule Vorarlberg University of Applied Sciences - Department of Mechatronics
- In Sweden:
  - Linköping Institute of Technology - Department of Manufacturing Management
  - Royal Institute of Technology, KTH Stockholm - Department of Production Engineering
- In Finland:
  - Tampere University of Technology
