= Bellevue Place Education Trust =

- Type: Multi-academy trust
- Industry: Free Schools
- Founded: 2012
- Number of locations: Seven preparatory Free Schools across London and the South-East
- Key people: Mark Greatrex (CEO)
- Website: Official website

Bellevue Place Education Trust (BPET) is a multi-academy trust formed in 2012 to support primary free schools in London and South East. The free schools are financed on a non-profit basis via a master funding agreement with the Department for Education.

In 2025, BPET is in the top 9% of all primary academy trust, as a combined average being ranked 60th of (649) academy trusts with three or more primary schools BPET is in the top 7% of larger primary academy trusts in England with more than eight primary schools. BPET is ranked 16th out of the 204 multi-academy trusts with eight or more primary.

== History ==
In 2012, Bellevue Place Education Trust was founded by members of the Bellevue Education and Place Group. It is a "private company limited by guarantee"

The following year the trust opened its first state-funded free school, Rutherford House in Balham. It was reported to be partnering with philosopher AC Grayling on another free school project, but that bid was unsuccessful.

The trust opened two more free schools in 2014: Braywick Court School in Maidenhead and Whitehall Park School in Islington.

Later in 2014 the Bellevue Place Education Trust obtained Government "pre-approval" to open four more free schools in London in 2015: Richmond Bridge Primary, Kilburn Grange, Halley House, and Watling Park. However, the trust was unable to secure a site in the Richmond Bridge area, so the proposed Richmond Bridge Primary School was renamed to Deer Park School.

== Controversies regarding sites ==
The establishment of Whitehall Park on the former site of Ashmount School was controversial, being opposed by the local council and some local residents, and criticised over the cost of refurbishing the school building.

The proposed location of Deer Park School led to opposition from some local residents who question the suitability of the chosen site.

The site chosen for Braywick Court School was also controversial with some of its local residents.
