= Encyclopedia of Earth =

Electronic reference about the Earth

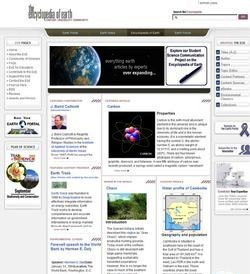
- Screenshot of eoearth.org home page
- Available in: English
- Predecessor: Digital Universe
- Headquarters: Washington, D.C.
- Country of origin: United States
- Owners: Environmental Information Coalition; National Council for Science and the Environment
- Website: editors.eol.org
- Commercial: No
- Registration: Optional
- Users: 500
- Launched: September 2006
- Current status: Active

The Encyclopedia of Earth (EoE) is an electronic reference about the Earth, its natural environments, and their interaction with society. The Encyclopedia is described as a free, fully searchable collection of articles written by scholars, professionals, educators, and other approved experts, who collaborate and review each other's work. The articles are written in non-technical language and are intended to be useful to students, educators, scholars, and professionals, as well as to the general public. The authors, editors, and even copy editors are attributed on the articles with links to biographical pages on those individuals.

The Encyclopedia of Earth is a component of the larger Earth Portal (part of the Digital Universe project), which is a constellation of subject-specific information portals that contain news services, structured metadata, a federated environmental search engine, and other information resources. The technology platform for the Encyclopedia of Earth is a modified version of MediaWiki, which is closed to all but approved users. Once an article is reviewed and approved it is published to a public site. The EoE was launched in September 2006 with about 360 articles, growing to 2,300 articles by mid-2007, and as of 30 November 2010, it had 7,678 articles. There are 500 members and contributors as of early 2020.

== Authoring and publishing process ==
Contributors to the Encyclopedia of Earth are made up of scientists, educators, and professionals within the environmental field. Contributors are vetted by the Environmental Information Coalition (EIC) Stewardship Committee, the governing body of the Encyclopedia of Earth, before they are given access to the author's wiki. Within the wiki, where they operate under their real names and are given attribution for the published articles.

Articles are written, edited, and published in a two-step process:

1. Content for the Encyclopedia is created, maintained, and governed by group of experts via a restricted-access wiki that uses a modified version of MediaWiki.
2. Upon completion, content is reviewed and approved by Topic Editors, and then published to the free public site.

Content may be continuously revised and updated on the authors' wiki, but revised articles require review and re-approval before revisions are displayed on the public site.

Contributors are designated as "Authors" or "Topic Editors." Contributors can create, write and edit freely on all content within the Encyclopedia. Topic Editors act as reviewers of articles on topics upon which they are judged to have a high level of expertise. Articles, when written, are assigned by Encyclopedia staff to Topic Editors for review and, if appropriate, approval and automatic publication to the public site. As of early 2009, EoE staff were reporting that there were approximately 1,200 contributors from 60 countries.

The EoE has about 70 (as of late 2010) Content Partners, organizations that have a written agreement to provide their content to the Encyclopedia. Content Partners include organizations like the World Wildlife Fund, Conservation International, and American Meteorological Society.

The EoE also cites Content Sources, organizations that have content in the public domain which is used in the Encyclopedia. In this category are various government agencies and Wikipedia. The Encyclopedia of Earth has a specific policy on use of Wikipedia content which requires authors and editors to carefully review and approve such content before using it and includes the following statement at the bottom of the article:

Note on Wikipedia Content: The authors of the content derived from Wikipedia are not identified. The Encyclopedia of Earth Author(s) and Topic Editor(s) listed at the top of this article may have significantly modified the content derived from Wikipedia with original content or content drawn from other sources. The Encyclopedia of Earth Topic Editor(s) listed at the top of this article has reviewed all of the content, including that derived from Wikipedia, and approved its accuracy for use in the Encyclopedia of Earth. See Encyclopedia of Earth Policy on use of Wikipedia Content for further details.

The Authors, Topic Editors, Copy Editors, Content Partners, and Content Sources, are all attributed on the articles with links to biographical pages on those individuals and institutions. This is part of the EoE's stated policy of transparency.

The Encyclopedia has a stated policy regarding neutrality and fairness that requires articles, when touching upon any issue of controversy, to represent every different view on a subject that attracts a significant portion of adherents, with each such view and its arguments or evidence being expressed as fairly and sympathetically as possible. According to this neutrality policy, the Encyclopedia itself does not advocate positions on environmental issues.

== Content ==
The Encyclopedia includes content somewhat more varied than a traditional encyclopedia or other related efforts like Wikipedia or Citizendium. In addition to traditional articles, the Encyclopedia includes: ebooks, lectures, reports, and speeches. These source documents are locked on the authors' wiki and are therefore fixed. EoE staff report that some college professors are beginning to write up their lecture notes to result in full courses within the Encyclopedia. Two projects that use the EoE as a content repository and resource are the Climate, Adaptation, Mitigation, E-Learning (CAMEL) project and the Online Clearinghouse for Education And Networking - Oil Interdisciplinary Learning (OCEAN-OIL) project.

== Copyright policy ==
Content is governed by the Creative Commons license known as "Attribution-Share Alike". This license permits anyone to (1) copy, distribute, and display material, (2) revise, edit, remix, tweak, and build upon material, and to make commercial use of material, subject to these conditions:

- Attribution. Users must attribute the work in the manner specified by the author or licensor.
- Share Alike. If users alter, transform, or build upon this work, they may distribute the resulting work only under a license identical to the "Attribution-Share Alike" license.

== Organization and people ==
The Encyclopedia of Earth is being created by the Environmental Information Coalition (EIC), an open membership group of scientists, educators, and organizations. The EIC defines the roles and responsibilities for individuals and institutions involved in the Coalition, as well as the editorial guidelines for the Encyclopedia. An EIC Stewardship Committee functions as the primary working group that develops and enforces policies and guidelines for the Encyclopedia, with input from Topic Editors and Authors.

The Secretariat for the EIC is the National Council for Science and the Environment (NCSE), based in Washington D.C., USA. NCSE is a 501(c)(3) nonprofit organization with a mission "to improve the scientific basis for environmental decisionmaking" and "specializes in programs that foster collaboration between diverse institutions, communities and individuals. We work closely with those creating and using environmental knowledge, including research, education, environmental, and business organizations, as well as governmental bodies at all levels."

The Stewardship Committee comprises:

- Arnold Bloom, University of California at Davis
- Nancy Golubiewski, Auckland Council
- Jennifer Hammock, Smithsonian/Encyclopedia of Life
- Andy Jorgensen, University of Toledo
- Ida Kubiszewski, Australian National University
- Mark McGinley, Lingnan University
- Emily Monosson
- Michael Pidwirny, University of British Columbia Okanagan

The International Advisory Board for the Encyclopedia is listed as Rita Colwell, Robert W. Corell, Robert Costanza, Mohamed H. A. Hassan, Thomas Homer-Dixon, Andrew J. Hoffman, Stephen P. Hubbell, Simon A. Levin, Bonnie J. McCay, David W. Orr, Rajendra K. Pachauri, Frank Sherwood Rowland, and B. L. Turner.

=== Migration to MediaWiki ===
On May 5, 2016 the editorial board announced that the encyclopedia would be migrating to the open source MediaWiki platform.

On November 16, 2016 the new web address was announced via email as being http://editors.eol.org/eoearth/wiki/Main_Page.

== See also ==
- Museum of the Earth
- Encyclopedia of Life
