= Citizendium =

Online encyclopedia founded by Larry Sanger

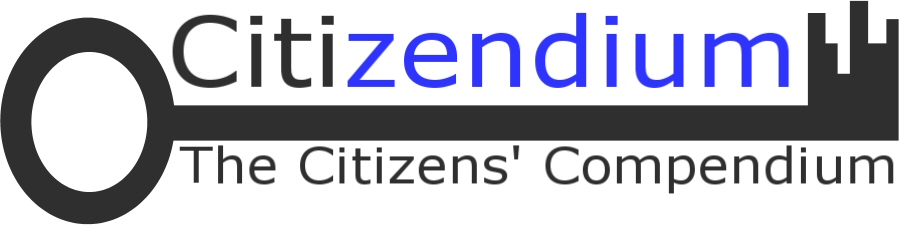

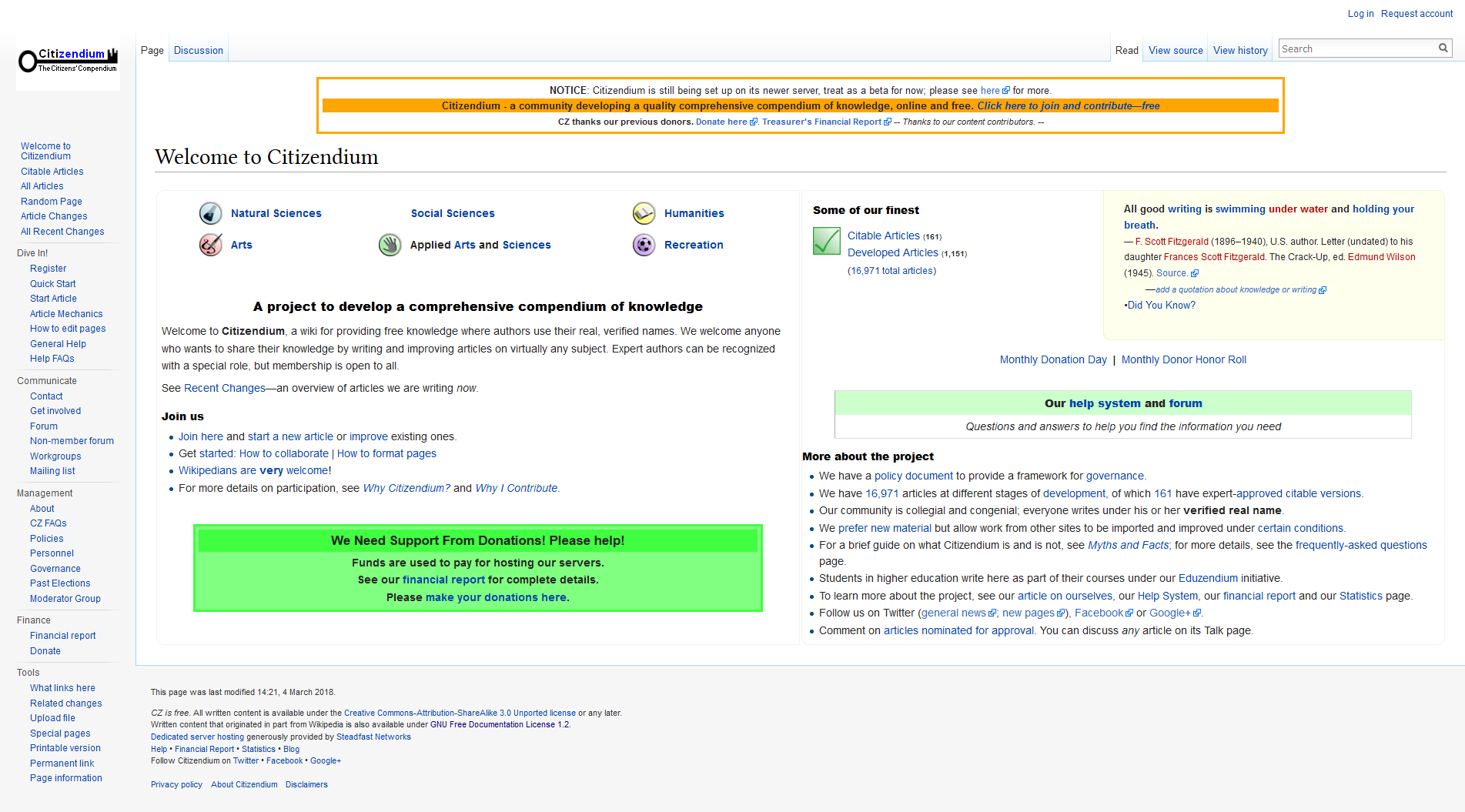
- Screenshot The Citizendium home page with default format (2018)
- Website type: Online encyclopedia
- Available in: English
- Creator: Larry Sanger
- Website: en.citizendium.org
- Commercial: No
- Registration: Optional (Required to edit pages, via request of account)
- Launched: 23 October 2006; 20 years ago (pilot); 25 March 2007; 19 years ago (public)
- Current status: active
- Content license: CC BY-SA 3.0 or later

Citizendium (/ˌsɪtɪˈzɛndiəm/ SIT-i-ZEN-dee-əm; "the citizens' compendium of everything") is an English-language wiki-based free online encyclopedia launched by Larry Sanger, co-founder of Nupedia and Wikipedia.

Sanger had worked as paid staff with Jimmy Wales to make Nupedia and Wikipedia, but left for financial reasons. He had been the editor-in-chief of Nupedia, which had an editorial review process similar to Citizendium's.

It was first announced in September 2006 as a fork of the English Wikipedia, but instead launched in March 2007 with an emphasis on original content. The project's aim was to improve the Wikipedia model by providing increased reliability. It planned to achieve this by requiring virtually all contributors to use their real names, by strictly moderating the project for unprofessional behavior, by providing "gentle expert oversight" of everyday contributors, and through "approved articles" that undergo a form of peer-review by topic experts with credentials.

Active contributors increased through the first quarter of 2008 and then declined; by 27 October 2011, the site had fewer than 100 active members. The last managing editor was Anthony Sebastian, until the office was vacated in 2016. As of 21 July 2023, it had 17,956 "live" and 6,322 "lemma" articles (lemmas are undeveloped articles that contain little more than a definition, similar to stub articles on Wikipedia). As of 8 September 2025, this had changed to 16,440 articles with an additional 3,744 lemma articles.

== Founder viewpoints ==
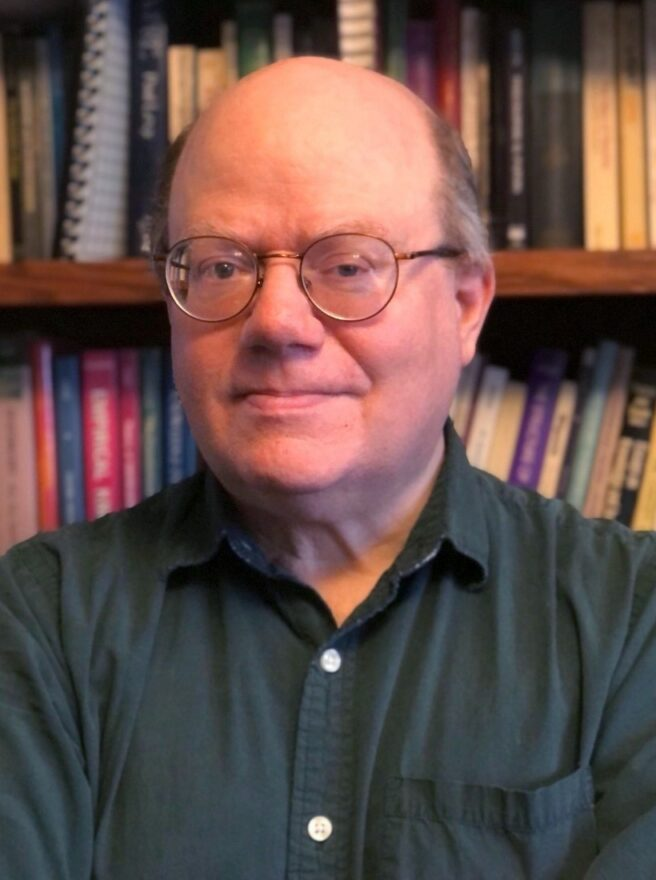
Larry Sanger, founder and former editor-in-chief of Citizendium

Sanger said in a 17 October 2006 press release that Citizendium "will soon attempt to unseat Wikipedia as the go-to destination for general information online". In August 2007, he captioned its pages: "The world needs a more credible free encyclopedia." The project began its pilot phase in October and November 2006.

On 18 January 2007, a change of plans was announced. Sanger announced on the CZ (Citizendium) mailing list that only articles marked "CZ Live", those which have been or will soon be worked on by Citizendium contributors, would remain on the site, and all other articles forked from Wikipedia would be deleted. Not all Citizendium contributors were supportive of this change, but Sanger emphasized that this deletion was "an experiment" and a new set of Wikipedia articles could be uploaded if the experiment were deemed unsuccessful.

=== Planning for succession of editor-in-chief ===
In May 2009, Sanger reduced his direct activity at Citizendium, and, in a message on 30 July 2009, he reminded those on the Citizendium-l mailing list of his previously declared intention not to serve as editor-in-chief for more than two or three years after the start of the project. Sanger has reiterated his call for the Citizendium community to prepare an orderly process for choosing a new editor-in-chief. Sanger said that he was spending more time on his WatchKnow project, partly because he needs to earn an income—he said the "Citizendium project doesn't earn me a dime"—and partly because the Citizendium community had demonstrated that it could function effectively without his close, daily involvement, and because "there are squeakier wheels in my life just now". He added that stepping aside may "precipitate something of a constitutional crisis, considering that we [Citizendium] never adopted a proper charter". Citizendium finally ratified its charter in September 2010. On 22 September 2010, Sanger stepped down as editor-in-chief, but said he would continue to support the project.

== Nature of the project ==
=== Fork of Wikipedia ===
According to statements and essays on Citizendium, the project was initially intended to begin as a fork of Wikipedia, carrying a copy of each article—under the rules of the GNU Free Documentation License—as it existed on Wikipedia at the time of Citizendium's launch. However, after initiating the idea of not forking, and then soliciting comments on the matter from Citizendium mailing list and web forum members, Sanger said that a complete fork at launch was not a "foregone conclusion". On 18 January 2007, Sanger announced that the pilot would, as an experiment, only carry articles that had been, or would soon be, worked on by Citizendium contributors, instead of a complete set of Wikipedia articles. He stated that the experiment "represents a reconception of our project's basic aim".

No announcement was made on Citizendium editions in languages other than English, but Sanger stated that they may be forthcoming after the English-language version was established and successfully working. In a review of Andrew Keen's book The Cult of the Amateur, Sanger comments ironically on Keen's favorable treatment of Citizendium: "The first example of a 'solution' he offers is the Citizendium, or the Citizens' Compendium, which I like to describe briefly as Wikipedia with editors and real names. But how can Citizendium be a solution to the problems he raises, if it has experts working without pay, and the result is free? If it succeeds, won't it contribute to the decline of reference publishing?"

=== Project goal ===
The stated aim of the project is to create a "new compendium of knowledge" based on the contributions of "intellectuals", defined as "educated, thinking people who read about science or ideas regularly." Citizendium aimed to foster an expert culture and a community that encourages participants (to be called "authors") to "respect" the expert contributions (by what he referred to as a "gentle process of guidance").

Experts are required to verify their qualifications openly, for transparency and publicly accepted authority. This contrasts with the open and largely anonymous nature of Wikipedia, where subject specialists have neither any verifiable special knowledge of their subject nor agreed special status. Sanger stated that editors would not have pre-approval rights over edits by ordinary authors, though editors would have somewhat undefined authority over articles that fall within their specific area of expertise.

=== Policies and structure ===
Unlike Wikipedia, Citizendium does not allow anonymous editing. Participants must register under their real names with a working email address. Sanger decided that Citizendium administrators would be called "constables," and need a bachelor's degree to qualify. He also instituted a minimum "maturity" requirement—25 years of age—for constables. The "head" constable is the Chief Constable (D. Matt Innis), and the head editor is the Managing Editor.

Originally, Sanger operated as Editor-in-Chief, the "main individual in charge," part of and answerable to a Board of Directors. Sanger stated that final decisions about management structure will not be made "until more of the (future) primary stakeholders are on the scene."

Citizendium articles are subject to an "approval" process after they have achieved reasonable quality. An "editor" can determine when an article is ready to be approved.

Initially the project phased under the Tides Center as an incubator project and then was supposed to be carried out under the auspices of the Citizendium Foundation, but in 2020, the treasurer of the project stated that the foundation was never registered.

=== Content ===
Breakdown of articles in December 2007:
1. Developing (38.2%)
2. Stub (30.3%)
3. Developed (15.8%)
4. External (14.7%)
5. Approved (1.00%)

Citizendium original articles are available under the Creative Commons Attribution ShareAlike 3.0 Unported License (CC BY-SA). Articles that originated in part from Wikipedia are also available under the GNU Free Documentation License version 1.2. These licensing decisions were announced on 21 December 2007, about a year after the launch of the pilot project.

== History ==
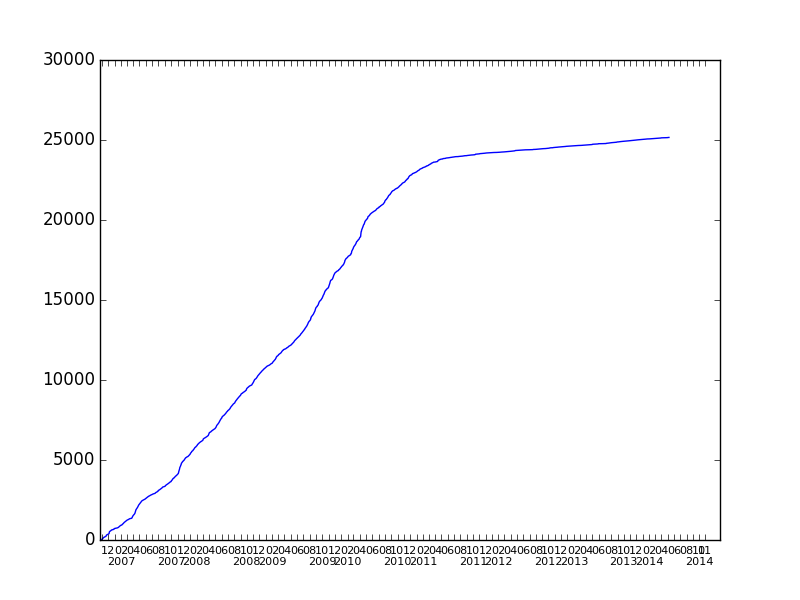
Number of articles from launch of the pilot project until late 2014

=== Pilot project and initial growth ===
The project was announced by Sanger on 15 September 2006, at the Wizards of OS 4 conference in Berlin. He gave no deadline for the full launch of the wiki. However, on 2 October 2006, Sanger released a pilot project announcement that envisioned a fully functioning wiki within "one to two months."

In an apparent attempt to quicken the pace of the project, on 2 October 2006, Citizendium web forum moderator Peter Hitchmough suggested what he called an "alpha test" of the concept. Hitchmough proposed the forking of a limited number of Wikipedia articles to a site where Citizendium web forum and mailing list members could "rewrite a complete section" of Wikipedia content.

Larry Sanger reacted enthusiastically to the idea and at first suggested his already existing Textop wiki as the site for the alpha test. Sanger later posted that Textop would not be a good choice, but showed continued interest in the proposal. He envisioned a "restricted-access" wiki where the idea could be tried and requested further discussion.

No access to the pilot version of Citizendium, even read-only, was allowed to the general public. Sanger stated: "Only invited people will be able to view and edit the pilot project wiki." Sanger also said that constables for the pilot project will be chosen by the chief constable.

In a press release on 17 October 2006, Sanger announced: "the fledgling Citizendium Foundation will launch a six-week pilot project open to potential contributors by invitation". Several editors and other project leaders were named. It was also announced that the Citizendium Foundation had "started the process of applying for 501(c)(3) status [non-profit status]" and had "received a firm commitment for a significant seed grant from a foundation, as well as small personal donations." In a follow-up post to the press release, Sanger said that the initial group allowed access to the pilot would consist of "ten editors, three constables, six authors, and me."

The pilot project began operations on 23 October 2006. On 8 November, Larry Sanger reported that 263 user names had access to the pilot wiki, 183 articles on the wiki were "live" (meaning "someone is or intends to be working on them") and there were about 300 total edits to the wiki on 7 November.

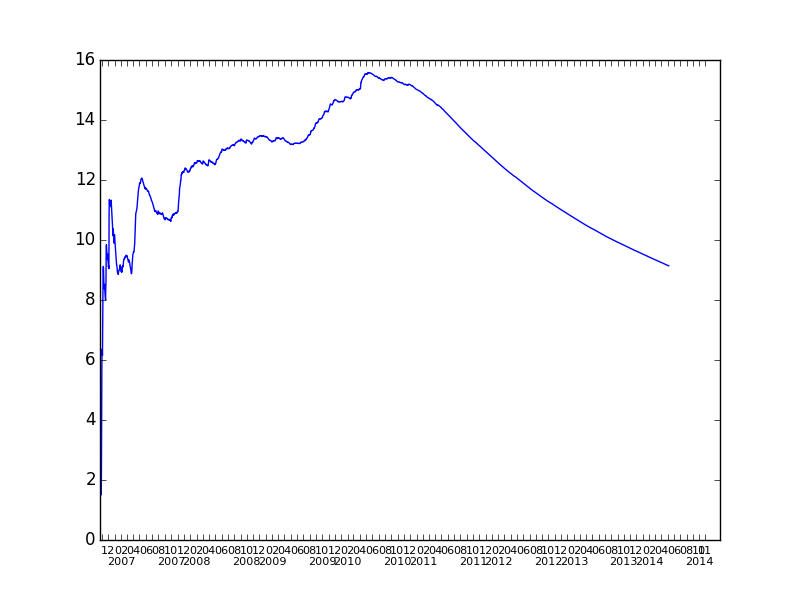
Creation rate (articles per day) until late 2014

In a 17 January 2007 post to the Citizendium forum, Sanger stated that "we have had only 10–20 (very) active people out of 500 accounts created." As a result, Sanger decided to delete all articles besides those marked "CZ live" from the pilot project in an attempt to motivate greater participation. On 22 January 2007, Citizendium experimented with a new self-registration procedure: read/write access was granted automatically after creation of the account. There were a few instances of vandalism after this change, though the vandalism was quickly reverted. On 19 January, Sanger announced the formal organization of Citizendium as a legal non-profit organization.

On 16 February 2007, in response to rising site vandalism, automatic account creation was put on hold while increased protections were being put in place to counter vandalism. The next day, page moves were limited to constables as an additional measure against vandalism. In addition, Sanger continued the process of un-forking the Citizendium from Wikipedia by inviting contributors to delete any Wikipedia content that had changed only superficially since it was imported.

=== Inauguration ===
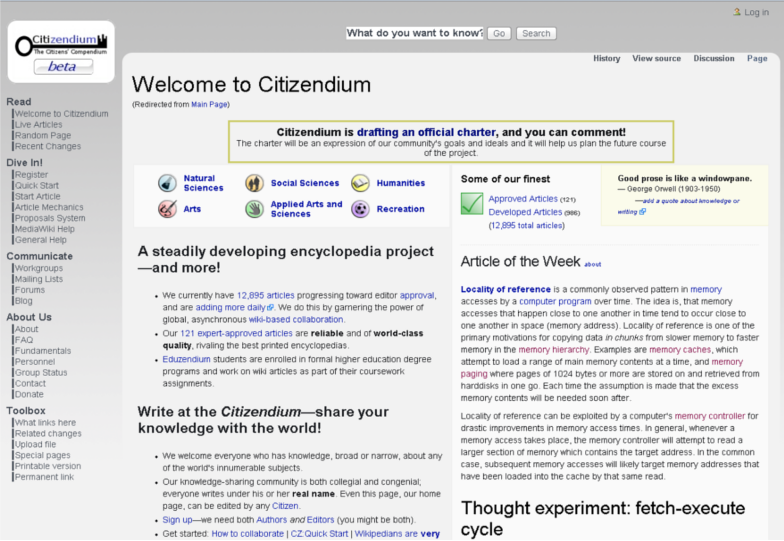
Citizendium homepage in 2010

On 25 March 2007, Citizendium ended its pilot phase and went live, into its beta phase, and the site became publicly readable. The launch coincided with a feature-length Associated Press article that ran widely, with a title in USA Today of "Citizendium aims to be better Wikipedia."

The day prior to launch, Sanger released an essay, "Why the Citizendium Will (Probably) Succeed" in which he stated that activity at Citizendium grew from 100 edits a day in the first month to over 500 prior to launch. After the launch, on 27 March 2007, a press release quotes Sanger as saying "You don't have to choose between content and accountability. We have shown that we can create open and credible content. We can, in fact, be open to all sorts of participants, but still hold people to higher standards of content and behavior as a community."

Sometime after the launch, it was noted that Citizendium's family-friendly policy would mean the project would likely tend to avoid articles on slang terms for sexual activity, and particularly explicit articles on sexual practices. The Citizendium has a "professionalism" policy for editors, which Sanger said is different from most online communities.

On 29 June 2007, Sanger announced an initiative via the project-wide mailing list that he dubbed "Citizendium 2.0". Characterizing his comments as a "project planning document," Sanger detailed a series of initiatives designed to launch Citizendium into its next phase of development. The document outlined plans for a judicial board, an advisory board, a personnel manager, a new chairman of the editorial council, wider participation in the project by volunteers, a system of subpages for articles, and an expanded article checklist.

=== Later growth ===
At the project's first anniversary in September 2007, Citizendium included 3,000 articles written and revised by 2,000 people. A number of media reports appeared in late October and early November 2007 about the anniversary of Citizendium. An article in the Financial Times quoted Larry Sanger predicting strong growth for the project: "At some point, possibly very soon, the Citizendium will grow explosively – say, quadruple the number of its active contributors, or even grow by an order of magnitude. And it will experience that growth over the course of a month or two, and its growth will continue to accelerate from that higher rate."

Citizendium was honored on 5 December 2007, as an award finalist of the Society for New Communications Research. The Society describes itself as a nonprofit global think-tank "dedicated to the advanced study of new communications tools, technologies and emerging modes of communication, and their effect on traditional media, professional communications, business, culture and society." The Society chose Citizendium for an award because it considered it "a leading organization" in these respects.

=== Decline ===
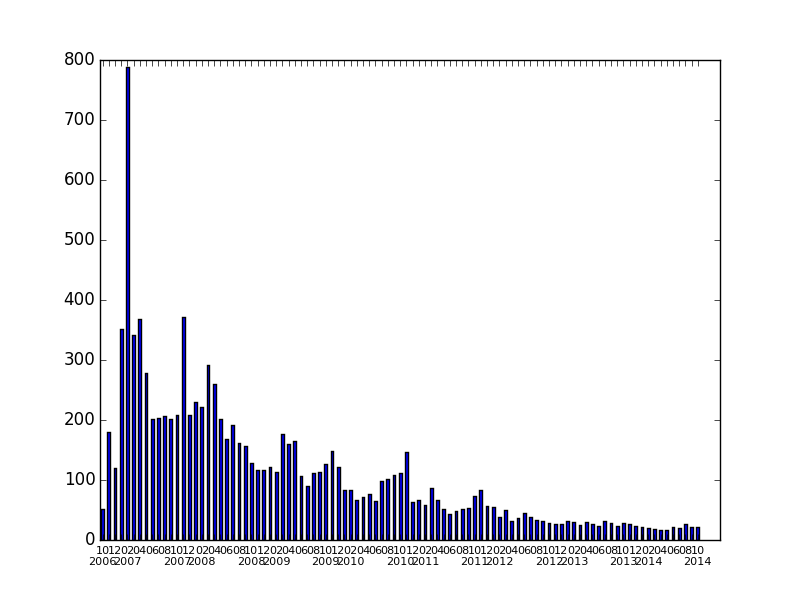
Number of users making at least one edit in a given month, until late 2014

Library writer Walt Crawford noted in April 2009 that Citizendium appeared to be in an "extended lull", with a constant rate of creation of new articles at around 13–14 per day and a decline in the number of active authors. In August 2009, Richard Waters wrote in the Financial Times technology blog: "At best, Citizendium could be called a qualified success. Launched in March 2007, as of August 2009 it had 11,810 articles – 2,999,674 fewer than the English-language version of Wikipedia." Mathieu O'Neil, Principal Researcher at the Australian Department of Broadband, Communication and the Digital Economy, wrote in a March 2010 article on crowdsourcing that "new participants to Wikipedia know that their contributions will have a significant audience; becoming a Wikipedia editor is trivial and instantaneous; since it lacks this immediate quality, Citizendium failed to attract the crowd."

In March 2010, the project had 90 contributors who made at least one edit, with a core of 25 contributors who made more than 100 edits. Median word count dropped from 468 words per article in October 2007 to 151 in May 2010. In June 2010, the number of users making 1, 20, or 100 edits per month all were at their lowest point since the project went public in March 2007. By October 2011, only about a dozen members made edits on a typical day, and an Ars Technica headline called the Citizendium project "dead in the water." In 2014, the number of Citizendium contributors was under 100 and the number of edits per day was about "a dozen or so" according to Winthrop University's Dean of Library Services. In September 2015, only seven editors had been active in the previous 30 days.

In November 2016, a referendum was held to abolish the governing Citizendium Charter and the Council in favor of Wikipedia-style discussion and consensus. It attracted nine votes, and was passed. A new managing editor was to be elected at the same time, but there were no nominations.

=== Recent status ===
On 2 July 2020, Larry Sanger wrote that he had transferred legal ownership of the Citizendium domain name to Pat Palmer, saying that Citizendium had "stopped being 'my' project a long time ago. But until this morning, I still owned the domain name." In early 2022, Citizendium upgraded its software to the latest version of MediaWiki. User accounts were not retained and had to be recreated on the new server.

As of July 2023, Citizendium's web traffic was 70,000 visits per month.

== See also ==
- List of forks of Wikipedia
- List of online encyclopedias
- Scholarpedia
