= Bomis =

Dot-com company (1996–2007)

Bomis, Inc.
- Company type: Private
- Website type: Internet portal; Advertising space
- Available in: English
- Founded: 1996
- Dissolved: 2007
- Headquarters: St. Petersburg, Florida, U.S.
- Founders: Jimmy Wales; Tim Shell; Michael Davis
- CEO: Tim Shell
- Industry: Dot-com
- Products: Bomis Premium; Bomis Babes; Bomis Babe Report; The Babe Engine; Bomis Browser
- Employees: 10
- Subsidiaries: Nupedia (2000–2003); Wikipedia (2001–2003)
- Website: bomis.com at the Wayback Machine (archived 2000-05-10)
- Advertising: Yes
- Registration: No
- Launched: 1996

Bomis, Inc. (/ˈbɒmɪs/, from Bitter Old Men in Suits; rhyming with "promise") was an American dot-com company best known for supporting the creations of free-content online-encyclopedia projects Nupedia and Wikipedia. It was co-founded in 1996 by Jimmy Wales, Tim Shell, and Michael Davis. By 2007, the company was inactive, with its Wikipedia-related resources transferred to the Wikimedia Foundation.

The company initially tried a number of ideas for content, including being a directory of information about Chicago. The site subsequently focused on content geared to a male audience, including information on sporting activities, automobiles, and women. Bomis became successful after focusing on pornography. "Bomis Babes" was devoted to erotic images; the "Bomis Babe Report" featured adult pictures. Bomis Premium, available for an additional fee, provided explicit material. "The Babe Engine" helped users find erotic content through a web search engine. The advertising director for Bomis noted that 99 percent of queries on the site were for nude women.

Bomis created Nupedia as a free online encyclopedia (with content submitted by experts) but it had a tedious, slow review process. Wikipedia was initially launched by Bomis to provide content for Nupedia, and was a for-profit venture (a Bomis subsidiary) through the end of 2002. As the costs of Wikipedia rose with its popularity, Bomis' revenues declined; these losses were compounded by the dot-com crash. Since Wikipedia was a drain on Bomis' resources, Wales and philosophy graduate student Larry Sanger decided to fund the project as a nonprofit. Sanger was laid off from Bomis in 2002. Nupedia content was merged into Wikipedia, and it ceased in 2003.

The non-profit Wikimedia Foundation began in 2003 with a board of trustees composed of Bomis' three founders (Wales, Davis, and Shell) and was first headquartered in St. Petersburg, Florida, Bomis' location. Wales used about US$100,000 of revenue from Bomis to fund Wikipedia before the decision to shift the encyclopedia to non-profit status. Wales stepped down from his role as CEO of Bomis in 2004. Shell was CEO of the company in 2005, while on the Wikimedia Foundation board of trustees. Wales edited Wikipedia in 2005 to remove the characterizations of Bomis as providing softcore pornography, which attracted media attention; Wales expressed regret for his actions. The Atlantic gave Bomis the nickname "Playboy of the Internet", and the term caught on in other media outlets. Scholars have described Bomis as a provider of softcore pornography.

== History ==
=== Background ===
Jimmy Wales left a study track at Indiana University as a PhD candidate to work in finance before completing his doctoral dissertation. In 1994 Wales was hired by Michael Davis, CEO of finance company Chicago Options Associates, as a trader focusing on futures contracts and options. Wales was adept at determining future movements of foreign currencies and interest rates; he was successful in Chicago, became independently wealthy, and was director of research at Chicago Options Associates from 1994 to 2000. He became acquainted with Tim Shell from email lists discussing philosophy.

Wales wanted to participate in the online-based entrepreneurial ventures which were increasingly popular and successful during the mid-1990s. His experience (from gaming in his youth) impressed on him the importance of networking. Wales was interested in computer science, experimenting with source code on the Internet and improving his skill at computer programming. In his spare time after work at Chicago Options Associates, Wales constructed his own web browser. While at the firm, he noted the successful 1995 initial public offering of Netscape Communications.

=== Foundation ===
Bomis founders

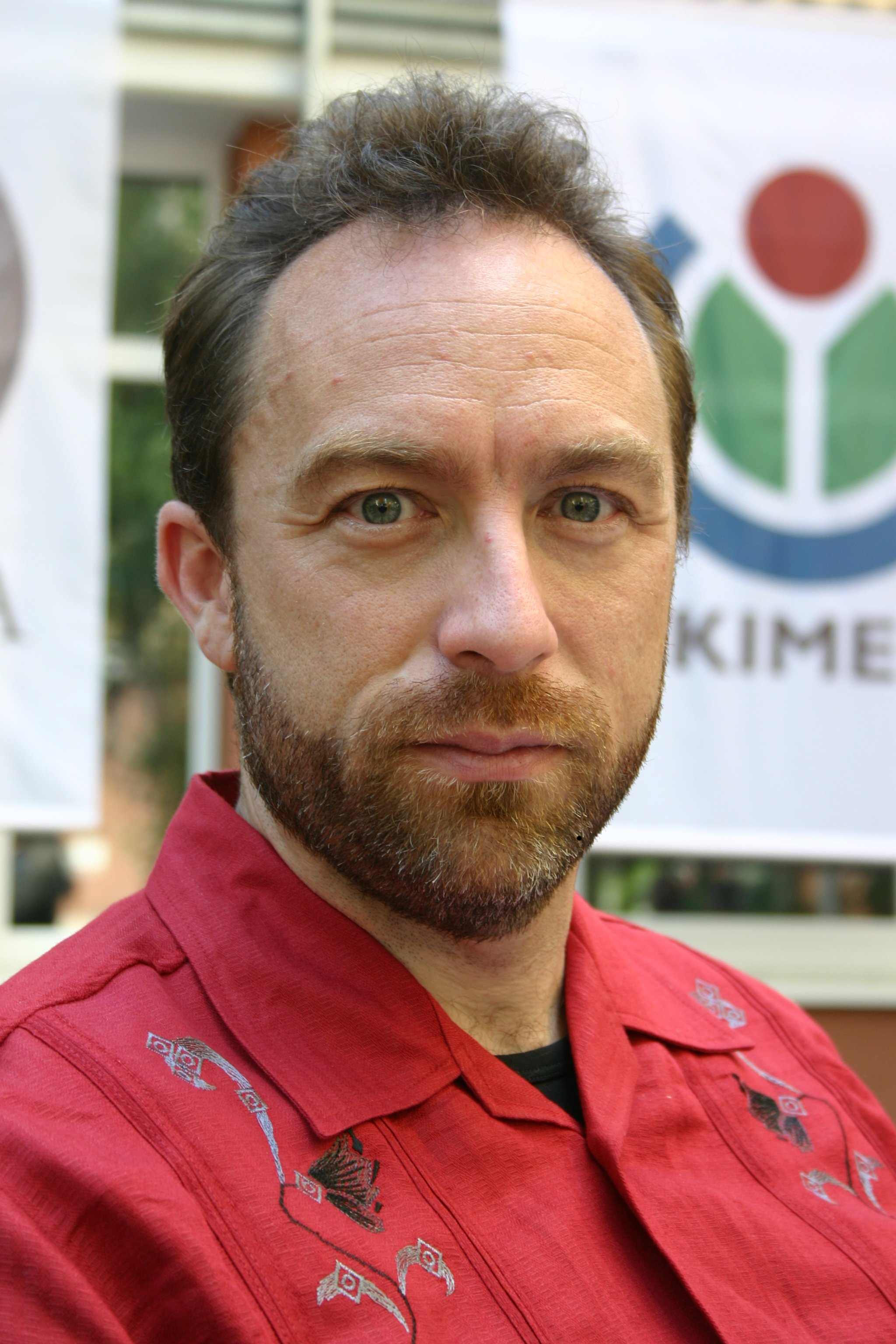
Jimmy Wales

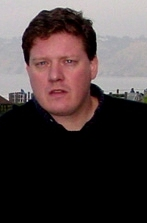
Tim Shell

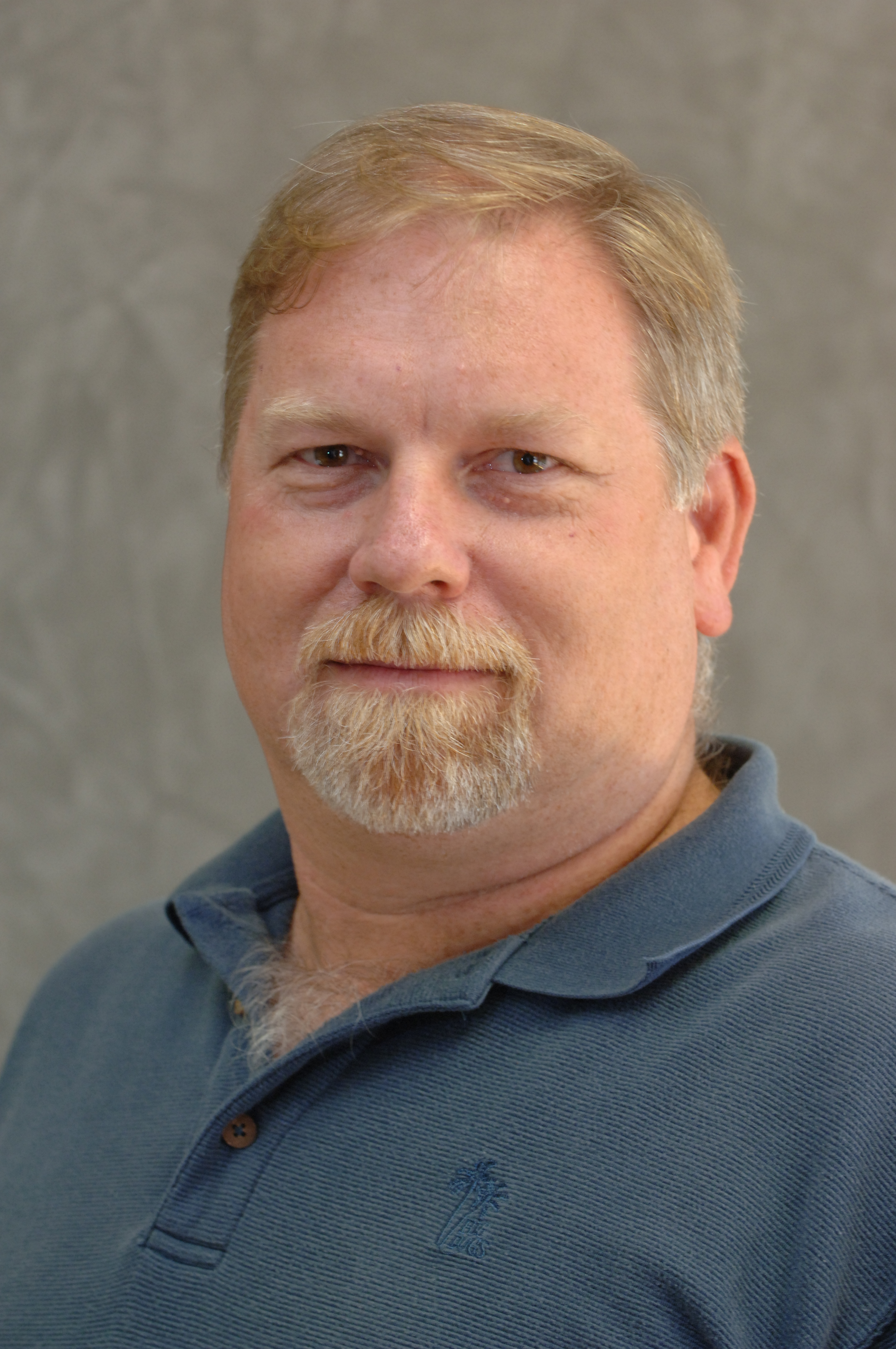
Michael Davis

Bomis was founded by Jimmy Wales, Tim Shell, and Michael Davis.

Wales co-founded Bomis in 1996, with business associates Tim Shell, and his then-manager Michael Davis, as a for-profit corporation with joint ownership. Wales was its chief manager. In 1998 he moved from Chicago to San Diego to work for Bomis, and then to St. Petersburg, Florida (where the company subsequently relocated).

The staff at Bomis was originally about five employees. Its 2000 staff included programmer Toan Vo, Andrew McCague and system administrator Jason Richey; Wales employed his high-school friend and best man in his second wedding, Terry Foote, as advertising director. In June 2000, Bomis was one of five network partners of Ask Jeeves. The majority of the revenue that came in to Bomis was generated through advertising. The most successful time for Bomis was during its venture as a member of the NBC web portal NBCi; this collapsed at the end of the dot-com bubble.

Although Bomis is not an acronym, the name stemmed from "Bitter Old Men in Suits" (as Wales and Shell called themselves in Chicago). The site began as a web portal, trying a number of ideas (including serving as an access point for information about Chicago). It later focused on male-oriented content, including information on sporting activities, automobiles, and women.

=== Hosted content ===
Bomis Babes

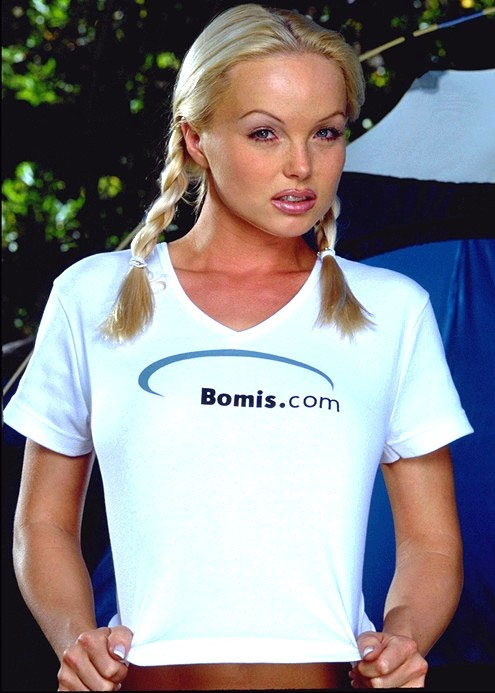
Silvia Saint

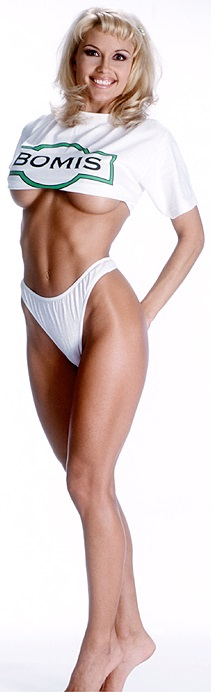
Deanna Merryman

Silvia Saint and Deanna Merryman in Bomis t-shirts

Working from the Open Directory Project, Bomis created and maintained hundreds of webrings on topics related to lad culture. In 1999 the company introduced the Bomis Browser, which helped users block online pop-up ads. Its webring on Star Wars was considered a useful resource for information on Star Wars: Episode I – The Phantom Menace (1999). Additional webrings included sections helping users find information on the 1942 film Casablanca, Hunter S. Thompson, Farrah Fawcett, Geri Halliwell of the Spice Girls, and the 1998 film Snake Eyes. "Bomis: The Buffy the Vampire Slayer Ring", devoted to Buffy the Vampire Slayer, organized over 50 sites related to the program. Sheila Jeffreys noted in her Beauty and Misogyny that in 2004 Bomis maintained "The Lipstick Fetish Ring", which helped users with a particular attraction to women in makeup.

Bomis became successful after it focused on X-rated and erotic media. Advertising generated revenue which enabled the company to fund other websites, and the site published suggestive pictures of professional models. In addition to Bomis the company maintained nekkid.com and nekkid.info, which featured pictures of nude women. About ten percent of Bomis' revenue was derived from pornographic films and blogs.

The website included a segment devoted to erotic images, "Bomis Babes", and a feature enabled users to submit recommended links to other sites appealing to a male audience. Peer-to-peer services provided by the site helped users find other websites about female celebrities, including Anna Kournikova and Pamela Anderson. In the Bomis Babes section was the Bomis Babe Report, begun in 2000, with pictures of porn stars in a blog format. The Bomis Babe Report produced original erotic material, including reports on pornographic film actors and celebrities who had posed nude. It was referred to as The Babe Report for short.

Wales referred to the site's softcore pornography as "glamour photography", and Bomis became familiar to Internet users for its erotic images. During this period Wales was photographed steering a yacht with a peaked cap, posing as a sea captain with a female professional model on either side of him. In the photograph, the women were wearing panties and T-shirts advertising Bomis.

A subscription section, Bomis Premium, provided access to adult content and erotic material; A three-day trial was US$2.95. While Bomis Babes provided nude images of females to subscribers, Bomis Premium featured lesbian sexual practices and female anatomy. Bomis created the Babe Engine, which helped users find erotic material online through a web search engine. According to Bomis advertising director Terry Foote, 99 percent of searches on the site related to nude women.

=== Nupedia and Wikipedia ===
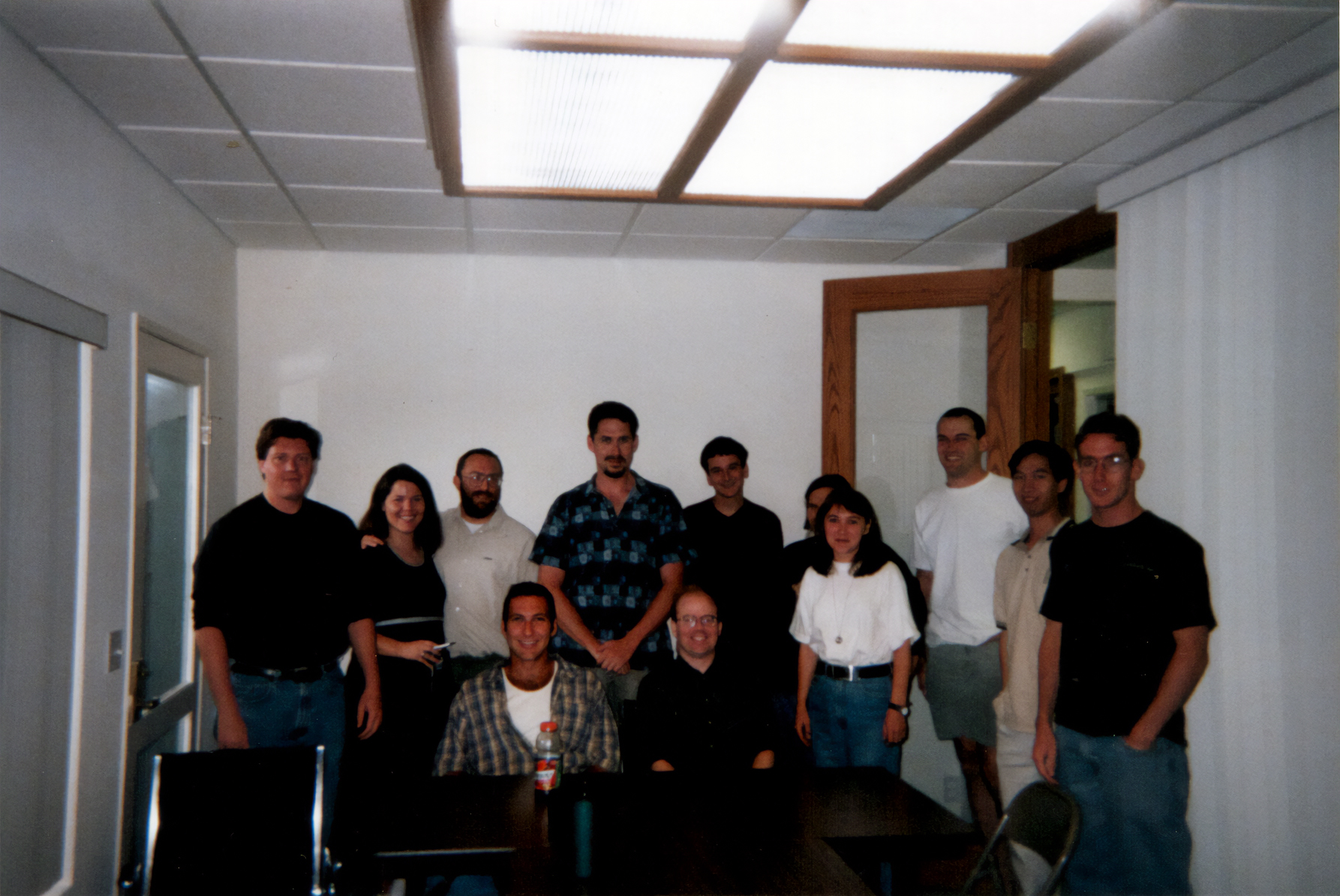
Bomis staff, summer 2000. From left to right standing: Tim Shell, Christine Wales, Jimmy Wales, Terry Foote, Jared Pappas-Kelley, Liz Campeau (Nupedia employee standing almost completely behind Rita Sanger), Rita Sanger, Jason Richey, Toan Vo and Andrew McCague. Seated: Jeremy Rosenfeld, Larry Sanger.

Bomis is best known for supporting the creation of free-content online-encyclopedia projects Nupedia and Wikipedia. Tim Shell and Michael Davis continued their partnership with Wales during the 2000 Nupedia venture. Larry Sanger met Jimmy Wales through an e-mail communication group about philosophy and objectivism, and joined Bomis in May, 1999. Sanger was a graduate student working towards a PhD degree in philosophy, with research focused on epistemology; he received his degree from Ohio State University, moving to San Diego to help Bomis with its encyclopedia venture. At the time Sanger joined Bomis, the company had a total workforce of two employees with help from programmers.

Sanger and Wales began Nupedia with resources from Bomis; at the beginning of 2000, the company agreed to provide early financing for Nupedia from its profits. Nupedia went live in March, when Wales was CEO of Bomis; Sanger was Nupedia's editor-in-chief. Nupedia's reading comprehension was intended for high-school graduates, and Bomis set its goal: "To set a new standard for breadth, depth, timeliness and lack of bias, and in the fullness of time to become the most comprehensive encyclopedia in the history of humankind."

Although Bomis began a search for experts to vet Nupedia articles, this proved tedious. In August 2000 Nupedia had more than 60 academics contributing to the peer-review process on the site, most with doctorates in philosophy or medicine. Scholars wishing to contribute to Nupedia were required to submit their credentials via fax for verification. At that time, Bomis was attempting to obtain advertising revenue for Nupedia and the company was optimistic that it could fund the project with ad space on Nupedia.com.

Wikipedia began as a feature of Nupedia.com on January 15, 2001, later known as Wikipedia Day. Someone working from the office.bomis.com server created the first edit to the website, the creation of HomePage with the text "This is the new WikiPedia!" (Note: Wales would claim to have made the first edit to Wikipedia with "Hello, World!", but no such edit survives in archives and it has been speculated that it was made to a test wiki that was later deleted.) It was originally intended only to generate draft articles for Nupedia, with finished articles moved to the latter. Wikipedia became a separate site days after the Nupedia advisory board opposed combining the two. In September 2001, Wales was simultaneously CEO of Bomis and co-founder of Wikipedia; Sanger was chief organizer of Wikipedia and editor-in-chief of Nupedia.

Nupedia was encumbered by its peer-review system, a seven-step process of review and copyediting, and Wikipedia grew at a faster rate. In November 2000, Nupedia had 115 potential articles awaiting its peer-review process. By September 2001, after a total investment of US$250,000 from Bomis, Nupedia produced 12 articles; from 2000 through 2003, Nupedia contributors produced a total of 24 finalized articles. Wikipedia had about 20,000 articles and versions in 18 languages by the end of 2001.

Bomis originally planned to make Wikipedia profitable, providing staffing and hardware for its initial structure; Wikipedia would not have survived without this early support. Bomis provided web servers and bandwidth for the projects, owning key items such as domain names. Wales used money from Bomis to maintain the Wikipedia servers in Tampa, Florida.

As the cost of Wikipedia rose with its popularity, Bomis' revenues declined as a result of the dot-com crash. In late 2000 Bomis had a staff of about 11 employees, but by early 2002 layoffs reduced the staff to its original size of about five. Sanger was laid off in February 2002; from January 15, 2001, through March 1, 2002, he was the sole paid editor of Wikipedia. Sanger stepped down from his dual roles as chief organizer of Wikipedia and editor-in-chief of Nupedia on March 1, 2002, feeling unable to commit to these areas on a volunteer basis and a dearth of "the habit or tradition of respect for expertise" from high-ranking Wikipedia members. He continued contributing to community discussions, optimistic about Wikipedia's future success.

After Sanger's departure, Wikipedia was managed by Wales and a burgeoning online community. Although Wales thought advertising was a possibility, the Wikipedia community was opposed to business development and Internet marketing was difficult in 2002. Wikipedia remained a for-profit venture (under the auspices of Bomis) through the end of 2002. By then it had moved from a .com domain name to .org, and Wales said that the site would not accept advertising.

Material from Nupedia was folded into Wikipedia and it was discontinued by 2003.

=== Wikimedia Foundation Board of Trustees ===
Wikimedia Foundation Board beginnings

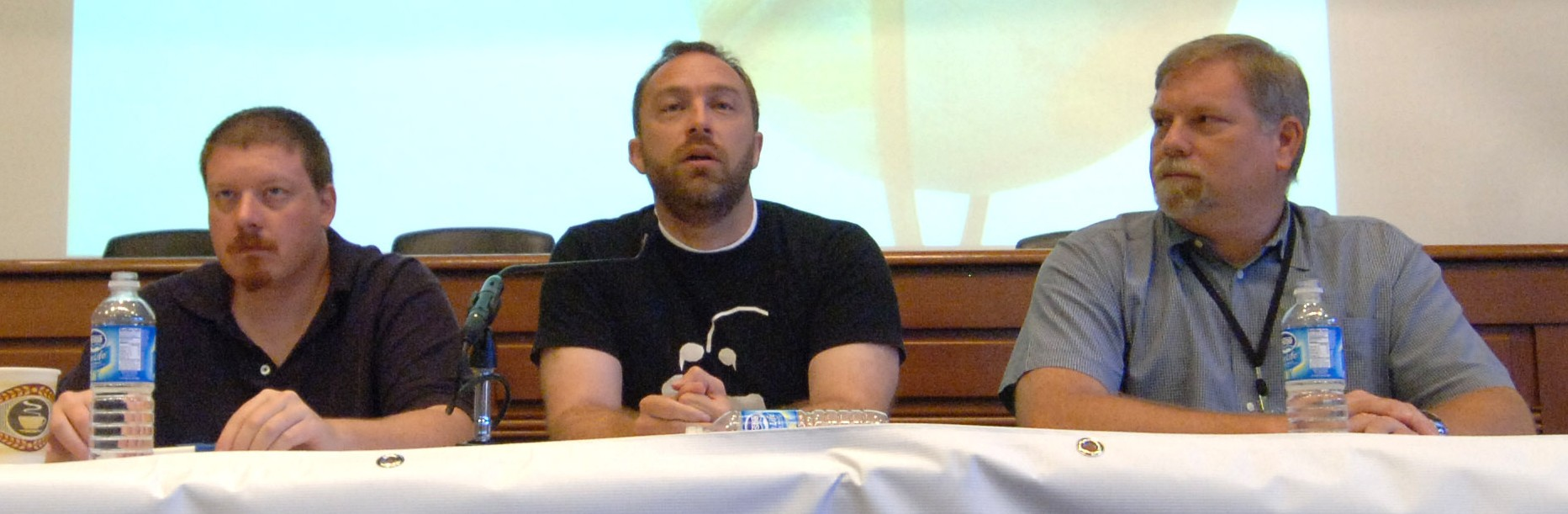
The first Wikimedia Foundation Board consisted of the three Bomis founders.

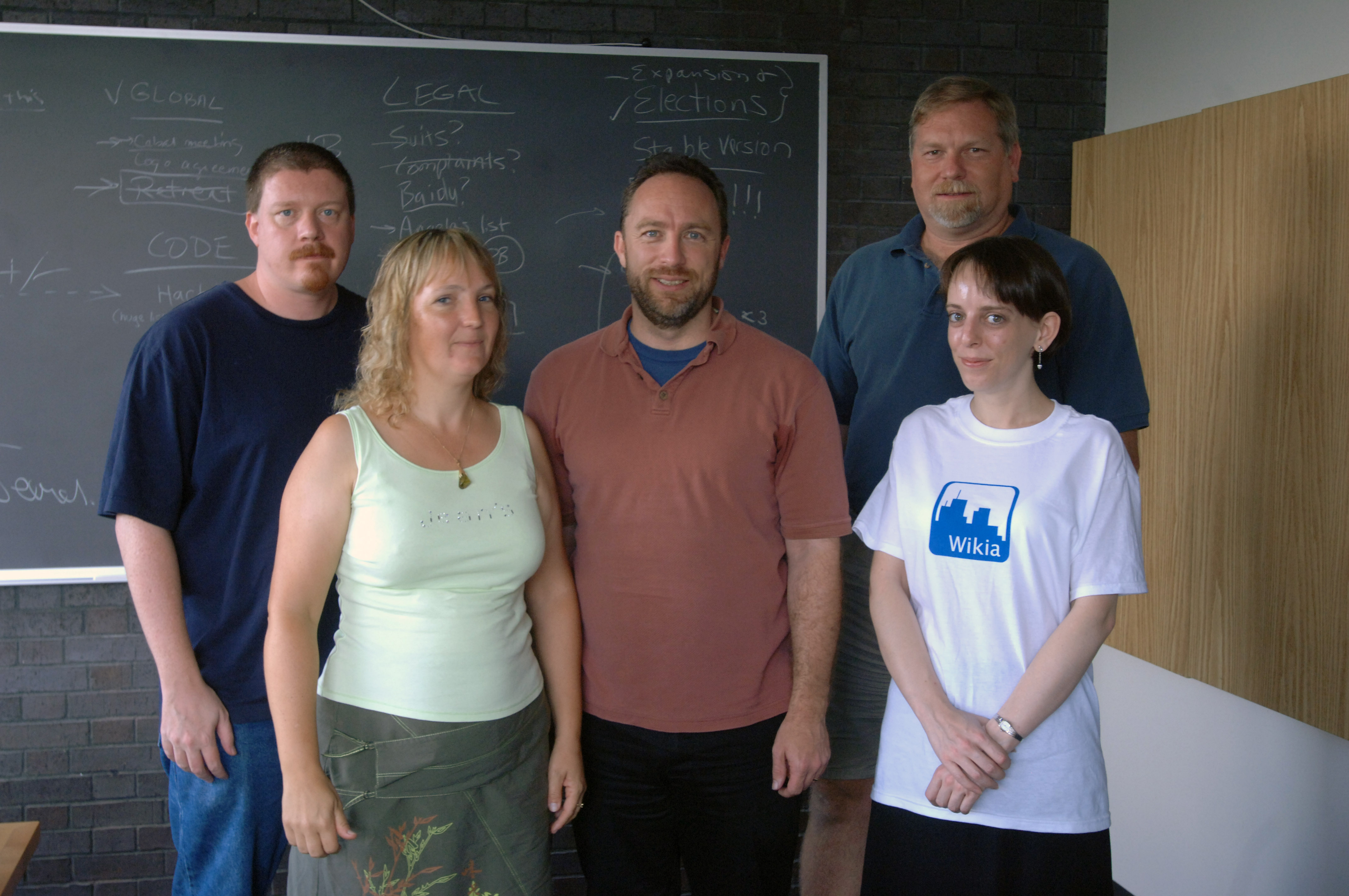
Board members in 2004

In 2004, community elections added two Wikipedia contributors to the board; Bomis' three founders retained their seats.

By 2003 Wikipedia had grown to 100,000 articles in its English-language version, and it became difficult for Bomis to continue financially supporting the project. With Wikipedia a drain on the company's resources, Wales and Sanger decided to fund the project on a non-profit basis. Bomis laid off most of its employees to continue operating, since Wikipedia was not generating revenue. The company owned Wikipedia from its creation through 2003, and Wales used about $100,000 of Bomis' revenue to fund Wikipedia before the decision to shift the encyclopedia to non-profit status.

In June 2003 Wikipedia was transferred to a nascent non-profit organization, the Wikimedia Foundation, which was formed as a charitable institution to supervise Wikipedia and its associated wiki-based sites. When the foundation was established, its staff began to solicit public funding and Bomis turned Wikipedia over to the non-profit. All Bomis-owned hardware used to run Wikipedia-associated websites was donated to the Wikimedia Foundation, and Wales transferred Wikipedia-related copyrights from Bomis to the foundation. It was first headquartered in St. Petersburg, Florida, where Bomis was located. The foundation shifted Wikipedia's dependence away from Bomis, allowing it to purchase hardware for expansion.

The Wikimedia Foundation board of trustees was initially composed of Bomis' three founders: Jimmy Wales and his two business partners, Michael Davis and Tim Shell. Shell and Davis were appointed to the board by Wales, but after Wikipedia community members complained that the board was composed of appointed individuals, the first elections were held in 2004. Two community members, Florence Devouard and Angela Beesley, were elected to the board of trustees.

In August 2004 Wales was chief executive officer of Bomis, and on September 20 Wikipedia reached the million-article mark on an expenditure of $500,000 (most directly from Wales). In November 2004 he told the St. Petersburg Times he no longer controlled Bomis' day-to-day operations, but retained ownership as a shareholder. In 2005, Tim Shell was CEO of Bomis and one of the board members overseeing Wikipedia. Shell remained CEO of Bomis in 2006, becoming vice-president of the Wikimedia Foundation and continuing to sit on its board. Bomis co-founder Michael Davis became treasurer of the Wikimedia Foundation that year. Wales told The Sydney Morning Herald in 2007 that although he retained partial ownership of Bomis, "It's pretty much dead." According to the Internet Archive, the Bomis website was last accessible with content in 2010; when accessed in 2013 by the archive, it had a welcome message for PetaBox. When accessed in 2014 by the archive, the website featured a blank white page with a line of text saying "Hello, world!".

== Aftermath ==
Wikipedia edits about Bomis by Jimmy Wales

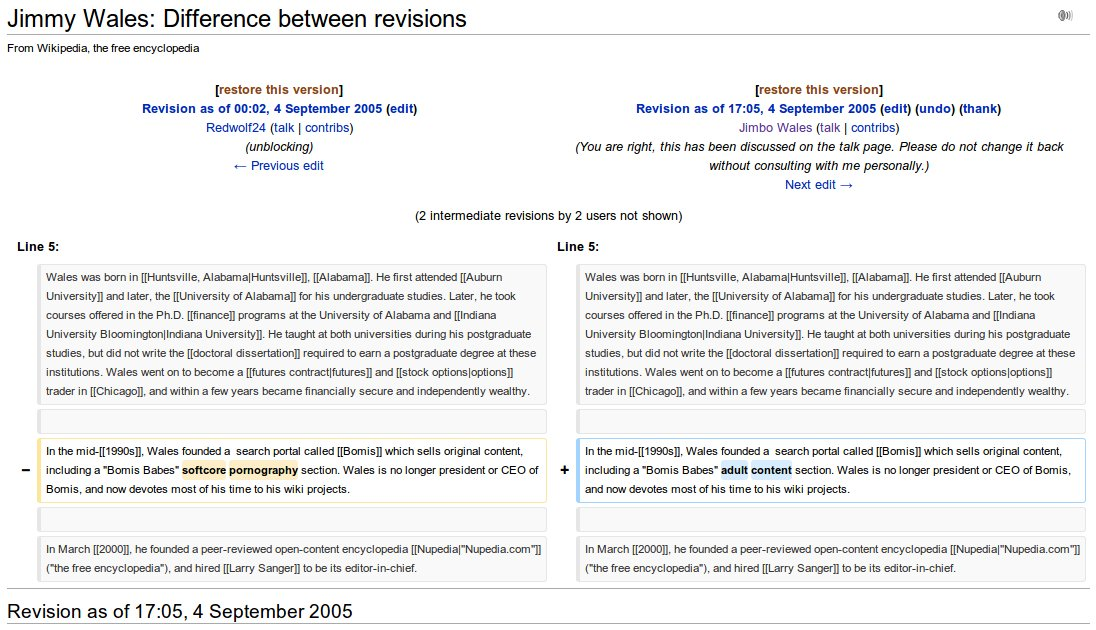
September 4, 2005

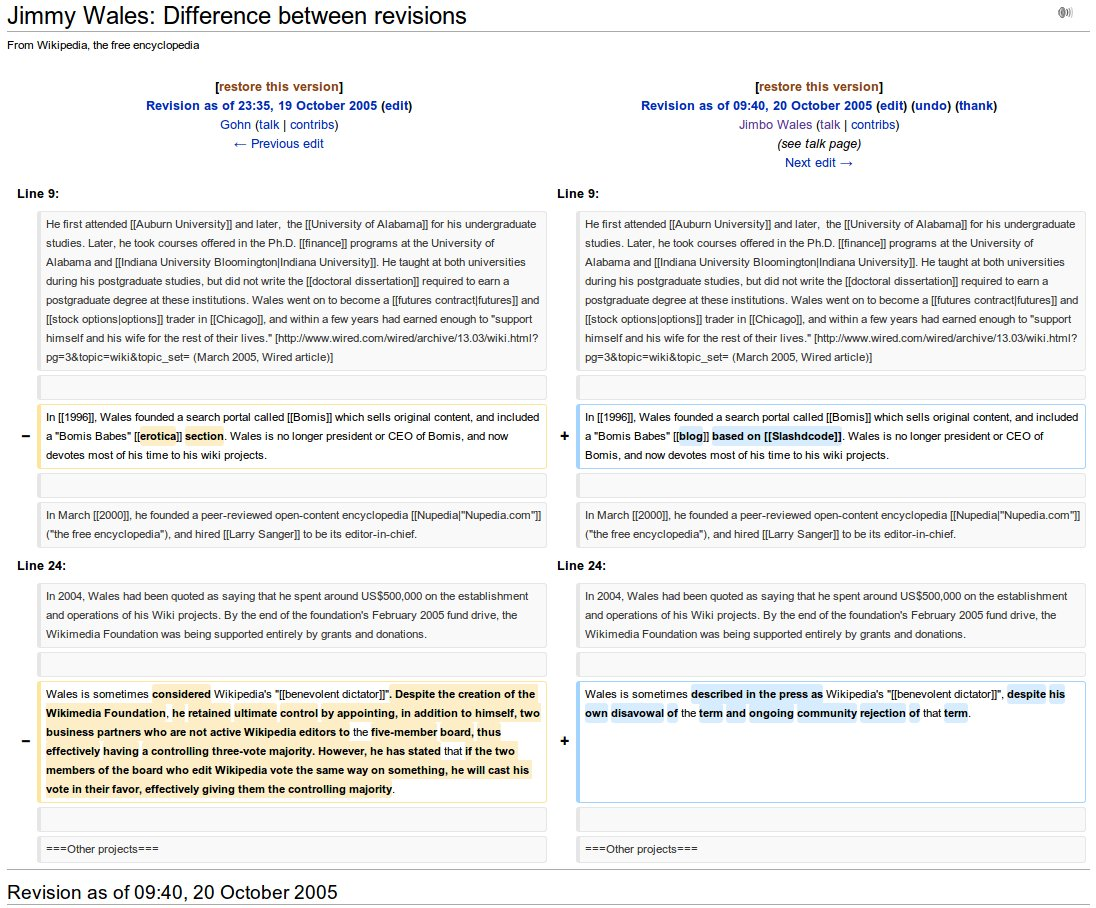
October 20, 2005

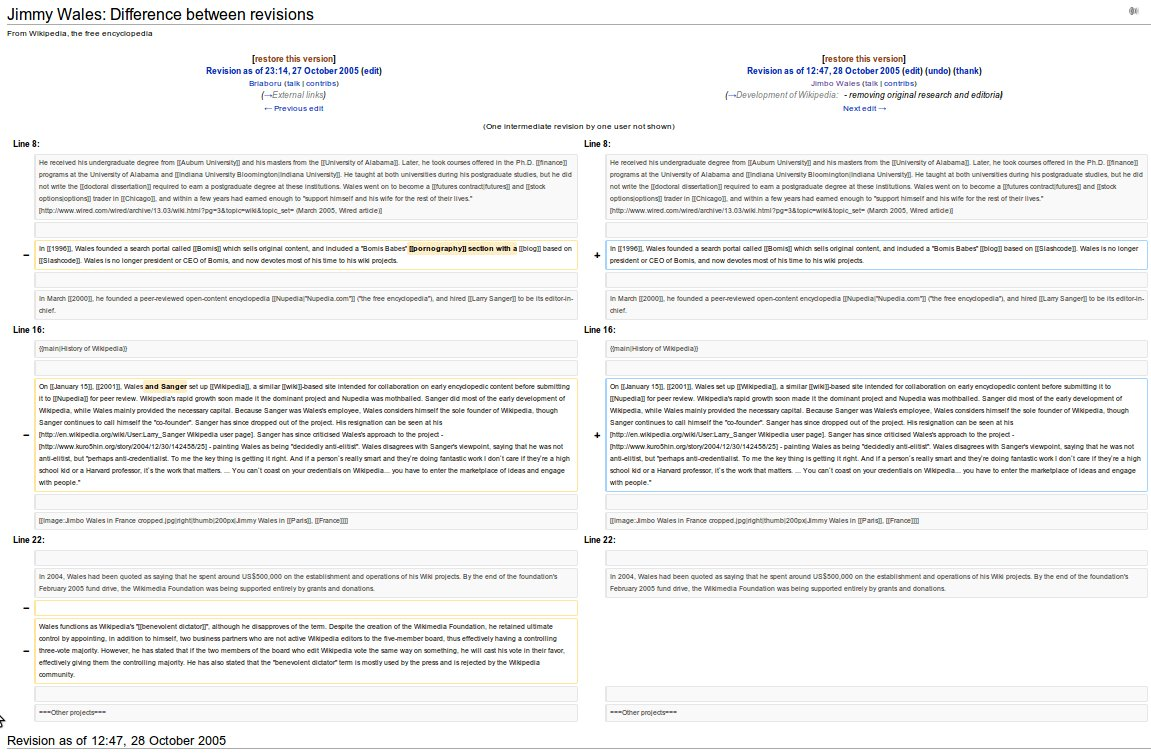
October 28, 2005

Edits to Wikipedia about Bomis made by Jimmy Wales were publicized by Rogers Cadenhead.

In 2005, Wales made 18 changes to his Wikipedia biography. He removed references to Bomis Babes as softcore pornography and erotica, and Larry Sanger as co-founder of Wikipedia. Wales' actions were publicized by author Rogers Cadenhead, attracting attention from US and UK media. (Note: Jimmy Wales' edits to Wikipedia to change information about Bomis and remove references to Larry Sanger as co-founder of the site was reported in The Times, Wired, New Statesman, Time, the Herald Sun, The New Yorker, and The New York Times.) In 2011, Time listed Wales' 2005 edits in its "Top 10 Wikipedia Moments".

Wikipedia policy warned users not to edit their own biography pages, with its rules on autobiographical editing quoting Wales: "It is a social faux pas to write about yourself." Larry Sanger said, "It does seem that Jimmy is attempting to rewrite history", and began a discussion on the talk page of Wales' biography about historical revisionism.

Wales called his actions fixing mistakes, but after Cadenhead publicized the edits to his biography he expressed regret for his actions. In The Times Wales said that individuals should not edit their own Wikipedia biographies, telling The New Yorker that the standard applied to himself as well. Wales warned that the activity should be discouraged because of the potential for bias: "I wish I hadn't done it. It's in poor taste."

Bomis was called the "Playboy of the Internet" by The Atlantic, and the sobriquet was subsequently used by publications including The Sunday Times, The Daily Telegraph, MSN Money, Wired, The Torch Magazine, and the 2007 book The Cult of the Amateur by Andrew Keen. Wales considered the "Playboy of the Internet" nickname inappropriate, although he was asked in interviews if his time at Bomis made him a "porn king". The 2010 documentary film about Wikipedia, Truth in Numbers? Everything, According to Wikipedia, discussed this characterization of Wales by journalists. Wales, interviewed in the film, called the characterization inaccurate and explained that his company responded to content demand from customers. (Note: Wales stated in the 2010 documentary Truth in Numbers? Everything, According to Wikipedia: "You know the press has this idea that I am a porn king. I really wasn't a king of anything, frankly, you know? Because at the time, when we looked at it, we were just like, 'Okay, well, this is what our customers will want, let's follow this.'") In later interviews, he responded to "porn king" questions by telling journalists to look at a page on Yahoo! about pornography related to dwarfism. According to a 2007 article in Reason, "If he was a porn king, he suggests, so is the head of the biggest Web portal in the world."

== Description of site ==
The Chronicle of Philanthropy characterized Bomis as "an Internet marketing firm... which also traded in erotic photographs for a while." Jeff Howe wrote in his 2008 book, Crowdsourcing: How the Power of the Crowd is Driving the Future of Business, about "one of Wales's less altruistic ventures, a Web portal called Bomis.com that featured, among other items, soft-core pornography." In his 2008 book, The Future of the Internet and How to Stop It, legal scholar Jonathan Zittrain wrote that "Bomis helped people find 'erotic photography', and earned money through advertising as well as subscription fees for premium content." The Guardian described the site as on "the fringes of the adult entertainment industry", and The Edge called Bomis.com an "explicit-content search engine". Business 2.0 Magazine described it as "a search portal... which created and hosted Web rings around popular search terms – including, not surprisingly, a lot of adult themes."

== Bibliography ==
- Anderson, Paul (2012). Web 2.0 and Beyond: Principles and Technologies. Chapman and Hall/CRC. pp. 136–38. ISBN 978-1-4398-2867-0.
- Ayer, Phoebe; Matthews, Charles; Yates, Ben (2008). How Wikipedia Works: And How You Can Be a Part of It. No Starch Press. pp. 46–47, 448–51. ISBN 978-1-59327-176-3.
- Barnett, Cynthia (September 2005). "Wiki mania". Florida Trend. 48 (5). Trend Magazines: 62. Archived from the original on November 22, 2005.
- Bergstein, Brian (March 26, 2007). "Wikipedia co-founder seeks to start all over again – this time with contributors' real names". The Sydney Morning Herald. Associated Press. Archived from the original on October 4, 2014.
- Bergstein, Brian (April 2, 2007). "Citizendium founder Sanger says he co-started Wikipedia, but don't tell that to Jimmy Wales". Pittsburgh Post-Gazette. Associated Press. Archived from the original on September 30, 2014.
- Bernstein, Jon (February 3, 2011). "Wikipedia's benevolent dictator". New Statesman. 140 (5038): 34. Archived from the original on February 5, 2011.
- Beveridge, John (April 26, 2007). "Looking up your own entry". Herald Sun. Nationwide News Pty Limited. p. 68 – via LexisNexis.
- Bhaskar, Michael (2013). The Content Machine: Towards a Theory of Publishing from the Printing Press to the Digital Network. Anthem Press. pp. 158–159. ISBN 978-0-85728-111-1.
- Blakely, Rhys (December 20, 2005). "Wikipedia founder edits himself". The Times. Archived from the original on February 21, 2007.
- "Silvia Saint Bomis T-shirt Gallery". Bomis Magazine. Archived from the original on March 2, 2000.
- "Bomis T-shirt Gallery". Bomis Magazine. Archived from the original on March 1, 2000. "Welcome to the Bomis.com T-shirt gallery! Please feel free to use any of these images on your own web site. All we ask is that you include a link back to Bomis.com. Thanks!"
- "Bomis.Com Home Page". 2010. Archived from the original on February 24, 2010.
- "Welcome to the US Petabox". 2013. Archived from the original on August 15, 2013.
- Brooks, David (August 4, 2004). "Online, interactive encyclopedia not just for geeks anymore". The Telegraph. Nashua, New Hampshire – via NewsBank.
- Buckland, Jason (May 12, 2011). "The humble beginnings of CEO big shots: Jimmy Wales". MSN Money. Microsoft. p. 1. Archived from the original on March 19, 2011.
- "Wikipedia Was Started With Revenue From Soft-Core Porn". Business Insider. bullfax.com. June 28, 2013. Archived from the original on February 1, 2014.
- Cadenhead, Rogers (December 20, 2005). "Bomis Denuded of Erotic Content". Workbench. Archived from the original on October 3, 2008.
- Chern, Kang Wan (December 1, 2008). "Net Value: Building the Wiki brand". The Edge. The Edge Communications Sdn. Bhd. – via LexisNexis.
- Chozick, Amy (June 29, 2013). "Jimmy Wales isn't a billionaire; He hasn't capitalized on Wikipedia, but still lives a jet-setter's life". International Herald Tribune. p. 9 – via LexisNexis.
- Chozick, Amy (June 30, 2013). "Jimmy Wales Is Not an Internet Billionaire". The New York Times Magazine. p. MM28. Archived from the original on June 30, 2013.
- Conway, Paul (Fall 2010). "Week 5b: Lessons of Wikipedia" ( (PDF)). SI 410: Ethics and Information Technology. University of Michigan. p. 7. Archived from the original on June 9, 2014.
- Craig, Elise (April 2013). "The Encyclopedic Mind of Jimmy Wales". Wired. Vol. 21, no. 4. p. 84. Archived from the original on April 9, 2014.
- Curley, Robert (2012). Issues in Cyberspace: From Privacy to Piracy. Britannica Educational Publishing. pp. 35–38. ISBN 978-1-61530-738-8.
- Daughn, Mark (2000). "Deanna Merryman 3". Bomis.com. Archived from the original on October 2, 2014.
- DiBona, Chris; Mark Stone; Danese Cooper (2005). Open Sources 2.0: The Continuing Evolution. O'Reilly Media. pp. 7, 310–334. ISBN 978-0-596-00802-4.
- Doran, James (December 23, 2006). "Curiosity filled the biggest textbook in the world; Factbox". The Times. London, England: Times Newspapers Limited. p. 49 – via LexisNexis.
- Du Bois, Grant (June 12, 2000). "Ask Jeeves bids banner ads adieu, welcomes new method". eWeek. QuinStreet Enterprise. p. 33 – via InfoTrac: General OneFile. "In addition to 1,800 advertisers in the Ask Jeeves distribution system, 900 of which are active, the company has five network partners-Ask.com and DirectHit.com, both of which are part of Ask Jeeves; Microsoft Corp.'s MSN. com Search; Bomis Inc.'s Bomis.com; and Monetize Media's SuperCyber Search."
- Duval, Jared (2010). Next Generation Democracy: What the Open-Source Revolution Means for Power, Politics, and Change. Bloomsbury. pp. 74–75, 80–81. ISBN 978-1-60819-066-9.
- "Brain scan: The free-knowledge fundamentalist". The Economist. The Economist Newspaper Limited; Technology Quarterly. June 5, 2008. Archived from the original on December 3, 2010.
- Edemariam, Aida (February 19, 2011). "Saturday: The Saturday interview: Master of the know-alls". The Guardian. p. 27 – via LexisNexis.
- Elliott, Tim (January 6, 2007). "The world according to Wiki; Digital Living". The Sydney Morning Herald. Sydney: John Fairfax Publications Pty Ltd. p. 22; Section: Spectrum – via LexisNexis. "before in 1996 starting a dot-com called Bomis, whose products included soft porn sites The Babe Report and nekkid.com. (According to The New Yorker, Wales has repeatedly tried to edit out references to pornography in his own Wikipedia entry.)"
- Finkelstein, Seth (September 24, 2008). "Read me first: Wikipedia isn't about human potential, whatever Wales says". The Guardian. London. Archived from the original on September 27, 2008.
- Finkelstein, Seth (December 18, 2008). "Technology: Read me first: Sting in the Scorpions tale is the exposure of Wiki's weakness". The Guardian. p. 2. Archived from the original on December 7, 2013.
- Forman, Bill (November 19, 2010). "The Seven Faces of Wikipedia". Colorado Springs Independent. Archived from the original on November 24, 2010.
- Frauenfelder, Mark (November 27, 2000). "The New Encyclopedia Salesmen". The Industry Standard. 3 (49): 110. Archived from the original on January 23, 2001.
- Friedman, Thomas L. (2007). The World Is Flat 3.0: A Brief History of the Twenty-first Century. Macmillan. p. 121. ISBN 978-0-312-42507-4.
- Gillmor, Dan (February 6, 1999). "Netizens raise a virtual barn called the 'Open Directory Project'". Mercury Center. San Jose. Archived from the original on April 22, 1999.
- The Globe and Mail (2012). The Lunch. Booktango. pp. 89–91. ISBN 978-1-4689-0835-0.
- Scott Glosserman, Nic Hill (2010). Truth in Numbers? (Documentary film). United States: Underdog Pictures; GlenEcho Entertainment. Event occurs at 34:30.
- Gobillot, Emmanuel (2011). Leadershift: Reinventing Leadership for the Age of Mass Collaboration. Kogan Page. pp. 84–86. ISBN 978-0-7494-6303-8.
- Greenwald, Ted (March 19, 2013). "How Jimmy Wales' Wikipedia Harnessed the Web as a Force for Good". Wired. 21 (4): 82. Archived from the original on April 9, 2014.
- "Wikipedia dilemma; Struggling free info site grapples with selling ad space". The Hamilton Spectator. Torstar Syndication Services, a division of Toronto Star Newspapers Ltd. Los Angeles Times. March 15, 2008. p. A14 – via Westlaw.
- Hansen, Evan (December 19, 2005). "Wikipedia Founder Edits Own Bio". Wired News. Archived from the original on August 23, 2008.
- "Wechsel an der Wikimedia-Spitze". Heise Online (in German). Heise Zeitschriften Verlag. October 28, 2006. Archived from the original on June 7, 2010.
- Hasan, Heather (2011). Wikipedia, 3.5 Million Articles & Counting. Rosen Central. pp. 5–11. ISBN 978-1-4488-5557-5.
- Henderson, Harry (2008). Encyclopedia of Computer Science and Technology. Facts on File. p. 500. ISBN 978-1-4381-1003-5.
- Hickman, Martin; GeneviAve Roberts (February 13, 2006). "Wikipedia under the microscope over accuracy". The Independent. London, England: Independent Print Ltd. p. 12. Archived from the original on February 5, 2009.
- Howe, Jeff (2008). Crowdsourcing: Why the Power of the Crowd Is Driving the Future of Business. Crown Business. pp. 58–60. ISBN 978-0-307-44932-0.
- Hutcheon, Stephen (April 22, 2007). "Facts and friction". The Sydney Morning Herald. Archived from the original on April 25, 2007.
- Isaacson, Walter (October 19, 2014). "You Can Look It Up: The Wikipedia Story". The Daily Beast. Archived from the original on October 20, 2014.
- Jeffreys, Sheila (2005). Beauty and Misogyny: Harmful Cultural Practices in the West. Routledge. pp. 60, 181. ISBN 978-0-415-35182-9.
- Jensen, Brennen (June 29, 2006). "Access for All". The Chronicle of Philanthropy. 18 (18). Chronicle of Higher Education, Inc. Archived from the original on September 30, 2014.
- Kleinz, Torsten (2004). "Qualitätsoffensive: Freie Online-Enzyklopädie Wikipedia stellt die Weichen für die Zukunft". C't (in German). 2004 (14). Heinz Heise: 38. Archived from the original on March 9, 2011.
- "It's a Wiki World – 5 Jahre Wikipedia". Heise Online (in German). Heise Zeitschriften Verlag. January 15, 2006. Archived from the original on October 22, 2009.
- Kleinz, Torsten (January 15, 2011). "Zehn Jahre Wikipedia". C't (in German). Heinz Heise. Archived from the original on January 17, 2011.
- Koerner, Brendan I. (2006). The Best of Technology Writing 2006. University of Michigan Press. pp. 115–117. ISBN 978-0-472-03195-5.
- Keen, Andrew (2008). The Cult of the Amateur. Random House. pp. 41–42. ISBN 978-0-385-52081-2.
- Kleeman, Jenny (March 2, 2007). "You couldn't make it up". The Times. London, England: Times Newspapers Limited. p. 4; Section: Features, Times2 – via LexisNexis.
- Kopytoff, Verne (July 19, 2007). "You could look it up". San Francisco Chronicle. p. C1. Archived from the original on October 21, 2012.
- Krueger, Curtis (November 8, 2004). "There's no end to it". The St. Petersburg Times. St. Petersburg, Florida. p. 1E. Archived from the original on December 20, 2004.
- Kuchinskas, Susan (March 26, 2009). "Jimmy Wales: Why the recession will not kill digital media". iMedia Connection. Archived from the original on March 30, 2009.
- LaPointe, Kirk (June 10, 1998). "How to find spicy stuff on the Web". The Gazette. Montreal, Quebec, Canada: CanWest Interactive, a division of CanWest Global Communications Corp. Hamilton Spectator. p. F10; Section: The Web Page – via LexisNexis.
- Lee, Jyh-An (2013). Nonprofit Organizations and the Intellectual Commons. Edward Elgar Publishing. p. 91. ISBN 978-1-78100-157-8.
- Lewis, John P. (Fall 2013). "Wikipedia: Is it the Library of Babel?" (PDF). The Torch Magazine. 87 (1). International Association of Torch Clubs; North Carolina Sociological Association. ISSN 2330-9261. Archived from the original (PDF) on February 1, 2014.
- Lessig, Lawrence (2009). Remix: Making Art and Commerce Thrive in the Hybrid Economy. Penguin Books. pp. 156–157. ISBN 978-0-14-311613-4.
- "Nupedia Launches Open-Content Model". School Library Journal. 46 (8). Library Journals, LLC. A wholly owned subsidiary of Media Source, Inc.: S6. August 2000 – via InfoTrac: General OneFile.
- Lievrouw, Leah (2011). Alternative and Activist New Media. Polity. pp. 202–205. ISBN 978-0-7456-4183-6.
- Lih, Andrew (2009). The Wikipedia Revolution: How a Bunch of Nobodies Created the World's Greatest Encyclopedia. Hyperion. pp. 6, 18–20, 28–32, 38–42, 63, 69, 76, 78–79. ISBN 978-1-4013-0371-6.
- Long, Camilla (January 22, 2012). "Hi, I'm the guy who blacked out the world". The Sunday Times. London, England: Times Newspapers Limited. p. 5 – via LexisNexis.
- Mahadevan, Jeremy (March 5, 2006). "Not everything on Wikipedia is fact". The New Straits Times. Malaysia: New Straits Times Press (Malaysia) Berhad. p. 15 – via LexisNexis.
- Mangu-Ward, Katherine (June 2007). "Wikipedia and Beyond: Jimmy Wales' sprawling vision". Reason. Reason Foundation. Archived from the original on October 6, 2009.
- McNichol, Tom (March 1, 2007). "Building a Wiki World". Business 2.0. CNN. Archived from the original on March 2, 2007.
- Mehegan, David (February 12, 2006). "Bias, Sabotage haunt Wikipedia's Free World". The Boston Globe. Boston, Massachusetts. Archived from the original on February 15, 2006.
- Jackson, Kathy Merlock (Winter 2000). "Playing It Again and Again: Casablanca's Impact on American Mass Media and Popular Culture". Journal of Popular Film and Television. 27 (4). Taylor & Francis Ltd.: 33. doi:10.1080/01956050009602813. S2CID 191490559.
- Meyer, Susan (2012). Jimmy Wales and Wikipedia. Rosen Pub Group. pp. 29–35, 56–58, 84–86. ISBN 978-1-4488-6912-1.
- Meyers, Peter (September 20, 2001). "Fact-driven? Collegial? This site wants you". The New York Times. p. D2. Archived from the original on April 15, 2009.
- Middleton, Chris (January 13, 2009). "Feature – The world of wikinomics". Computer Weekly. Vol. 203. TechTarget. Archived from the original on November 27, 2012.
- Miller, Nick (April 25, 2007). "The wisdom of one". The Age. p. 17. Archived from the original on May 9, 2007.
- Mitchell, Dan (December 24, 2005). "What's Online: Insider Editing at Wikipedia". The New York Times. Archived from the original on September 30, 2014.
- Moody, Glyn (July 13, 2006). "Technology: Inside IT: This time, it'll be a Wikipedia written by experts". The Guardian. London, England. p. 5. Archived from the original on December 14, 2013.
- Myers, Ken S. (Fall 2006). "Wikimmunity: fitting the Communications Decency Act to Wikipedia" (PDF). Harvard Journal of Law & Technology. 20 (1). Harvard Law School: 163. Archived from the original (PDF) on February 21, 2007.
- Neate, Rupert (October 7, 2008). "Wikipedia founder Jimmy Wales goes bananas". The Daily Telegraph. London. Archived from the original on November 10, 2008.
- "This is Nekkid.info". Nekkid.info. January 14, 2002. Archived from the original on January 14, 2002.
- "Truth in Numbers: The World According to Wikipedia – Summary". Paley Center for Media. paleycenter.org. 2014. Archived from the original on September 30, 2014.
- "People Who've Shaped The Internet". PC Quest. Athena Information Solutions Pvt. Ltd. January 3, 2012 – via Westlaw.
- Pink, Daniel H. (March 2005). "The Book Stops Here". Wired News. 13 (3). Condé Nast Digital. Archived from the original on March 4, 2005.
- Peterson, Kim (May 6, 2002). "Encyclopedias go digital Educational tomes shrink in size, but grow in number". U-T San Diego. Union-Tribune Publishing Co. p. C1 – via NewsBank.
- Poe, Marshall (September 2006). "The Hive". The Atlantic Monthly. The Atlantic Monthly Group. Archived from the original on October 26, 2012.
- QNP (November 19, 1998). "Buffy slays 'em". Courier Mail. Queensland, Australia: Nationwide News Pty Limited. p. 17; Section: What's on – via LexisNexis.
- Chester R (July 23, 1998). "Synthetic high". Courier Mail. Queensland, Australia: Nationwide News Pty Limited. p. 25; Section: What's on – via LexisNexis.
- Chester R (October 1, 1998). "More like snake oil". Courier Mail. Queensland, Australia: Nationwide News Pty Limited. p. 21; Section: What's on – via LexisNexis.
- Reagle, Joseph Michael (2010). Good Faith Collaboration: The Culture of Wikipedia. The MIT Press. pp. 35–36, 41, 120. ISBN 978-0-262-01447-2.
- Richardson, Joanne (2004). Anarchitexts: A Subsol Anthology. Autonomedia. p. 339. ISBN 978-1-57027-142-7.
- Rollins, Deborah (May 15, 2000). "Nupedia". Booklist. 96 (18). American Library Association: 1786.
- Romero, Frances (January 13, 2011). "Top 10 Wikipedia Moments – World Wide Wiki: Who Founded Wikipedia?". Time. Archived from the original on November 10, 2013.
- Rosenzweig, Roy (June 2006). "Can History Be Open Source?". The Journal of American History. 93 (1): 117–146. doi:10.2307/4486062. JSTOR 4486062. Archived from the original on April 25, 2010.
- Rosenzweig, Roy (2013). Clio Wired: The Future of the Past in the Digital Age. Columbia University Press. pp. 54, 81, 258–261. ISBN 978-0-231-52171-0.
- Schiff, Stacy (July 31, 2006). "Annals of Information: Know It All – Can Wikipedia conquer expertise?". The New Yorker. Archived from the original on September 30, 2014. "Four years later, he moved to San Diego, where he used his savings to found an Internet portal. Its audience was mostly men; pornography—videos and blogs—accounted for about a tenth of its revenues."
- Seitz, Patrick (June 15, 2011). "The Wizard of Wikipedia Click: Jimmy Wales sparked the go-to information site". Investor's Business Daily. Investor's Business Daily, Inc. p. A3 – via LexisNexis.
- Semuels, Alana (March 17, 2008). "Wikipedia experiences growing pains – Business plan "unsophisticated" Many wonder if site can avoid selling ads". The Seattle Times. Los Angeles Times. p. E4 – via NewsBank.
- Seybold, Patricia B. (2006). Outside Innovation: How Your Customers Will Co-Design Your Company's Future. HarperBusiness. p. 250. ISBN 978-0-06-113590-3.
- Shirky, Clay (2009). "Chapter 5: Personal Motivation Meets Collaborative Production". Here Comes Everybody: The Power of Organizing Without Organizations. Penguin Books. ISBN 978-0-14-311494-9.
- Slater, Joanna (January 15, 2011). "The man with all the answers". The Globe and Mail. Toronto, Canada: The Globe and Mail Inc. p. B3 – via LexisNexis.
- Soriano, Csar G. (February 26, 1999). "The faithful have a galaxy of Web sites to visit". USA Today. Gannett Company, Inc. p. 2E – via LexisNexis.
- Spirrison, Brad (December 4, 2006). "For the record, Wikipedia has some roots in Chicago". Chicago Sun-Times. Chicago, Illinois: Chicago Sun-Times, Inc. p. 62 – via NewsBank.
- Stöcker, Christian (August 31, 2010). "Eine Weltmacht im Netz". Der Spiegel (in German). Archived from the original on September 10, 2010.
- "Spotlight : Lawrence Mark "Larry" Sanger". The Star. Amman, Jordan: Al Bawaba (Middle East) Ltd. April 2, 2007. Archived from the original on September 30, 2014.
- "Mr Know-It-All is giving up billions". The Sunday Times. January 16, 2011. p. 23. Archived from the original on October 6, 2014.
- Tai, Elizabeth (June 19, 2013). "Features: The encyclopaedia salesman". The Star. Star Publications. Archived from the original on February 1, 2014.
- Twose, Helen (November 10, 2007). "Mr Wikipedia's knowledge quest". The New Zealand Herald. Auckland, New Zealand: APN Newspapers Pty Ltd. p. 5 – via WestLaw.
- Ward, Cotton (September 9, 2000). "Living in the '70s; R2 The '70s Reviews". The Sydney Morning Herald. Sydney: John Fairfax Publications Pty Ltd. p. 8; Section: Computers, Icon – via LexisNexis.
- Szpilma, Daniel W. (September 1, 2014). "Ich will kein Diktator sein". Basler Zeitung (in German). Basel, Switzerland: Basler Zeitung Medien. OCLC 183307820. Archived from the original on September 5, 2014.
- Waters, John K. (2010). The Everything Guide to Social Media. Adams Media. pp. 179–180. ISBN 978-1-4405-0631-4.
- Weinberger, David (2008). Everything Is Miscellaneous: The Power of the New Digital Disorder. Holt. p. 138. ISBN 978-0-8050-8811-3.
- Wright, Robert (April 8, 1999). "'Webbies' honour best of the Internet". Toronto Star. Toronto Star Newspapers, Ltd. – via LexisNexis.
- Zittrain, Jonathan (2008). The Future of the Internet—And How to Stop It. Yale University Press. p. 133. ISBN 978-0-300-14534-2.
