= UUU =

UUU, Uuu, or UuU may refer to:

== Places ==
- Newport State Airport (Rhode Island), USA (FAA airport code UUU)
- Manumu Airport (IATA airport code UUU), Manumu, Papua New Guinea; see List of airports by IATA airport code: U
- Oceania (NATO continent code UUU), see List of NATO country codes
- Triple U Buffalo Ranch, ranch in Stanley County, South Dakota, USA

== People ==
- Ugueth Urtaín Urbina (born 1974), Venezuelan baseball player

== Arts, entertainment, media ==
- The Time Warrior (production code UUU), 1973–74 Doctor Who serial
- Channel UUU (also 73 or W+47), a standardized television channel; see Pan-American television frequencies
- Triple U FM, Australian radio station
- WUUU-FM, a country music outlet based out of Franklinton, Louisiana

=== Songs ===
- "U U U" (song), a 2011 song by Will Pang off the album 808 (album)
- "UUU" (song), a 2011 song by Wheesung off the album They Are Coming
- "Uuu" (song), a 2017 song by Field Medic off the album Songs from the Sunroom
- "UUU" (single), a 2016 song by Choi Jung-in off the album Rare

== Chemistry and physics ==
- Unununium (Uuu), the former name of a chemical element now called roentgenium (Rg)
- Δ++ variant of the delta baryon with composition (uuu) -- triple up quarks
- UUU, or uracil uracil uracil, the RNA codon for phenylalanine

== Groups, companies, organizations ==
- Uranium One (TSX: UUU, JSE: UUU), Canadian-based uranium mining company
- Ulotrichian Universal Union, a society in the Caribbean

== Other uses ==
- U language (ISO 639 language code uuu), a language found in Yunnan and Myanmar
- UuU, the page that had the first recorded Wikipedia edit until 2019

== See also ==
- uwu
- You You You, an Alvin Stardust song
- You, You, You, a popular song recorded by the Ames Brothers in 1953
- Yuki Yuna Is a Hero, the Japanese anime series often abbreviated YuYuYu
- U3 (disambiguation)
- 3U (disambiguation)
- UU (disambiguation)
- U (disambiguation)
