= Chicago Options Associates =

American finance company

- Type: For-profit
- Industry: Finance
- Founded: 1987
- Founder: Michael E. Davis; Oliver R. W. Pergams
- Headquarters: Chicago, Illinois, United States
- Key people: Michael E. Davis; Oliver R. W. Pergams; Jimmy Wales
- Services: Trading: options and futures contracts

Chicago Options Associates (COA) is a finance company in Chicago, Illinois, which specializes in trading options and futures contracts. It was founded in 1987 by Oliver R. W. Pergams and Michael E. Davis. In 1994 Davis was its chief executive officer, hiring then-graduate student Jimmy Wales as research director; Wales served in this position until 1998.

The company and Davis were the subject of litigation resulting from a 2007 Illinois Supreme Court decision. In Dowling v. Chicago Options Associates, plaintiff Brian Dowling successfully sued the company (and Davis), winning a judgement of US$817,830.45 from both defendants. Davis tried to shield his assets by transferring funds to a law firm, DLA Piper, which had assisted him in buying a home in Florida. During this representation, Davis paid a retainer of $100,000 to DLA Piper; Dowling maintained that he was owed this money. Although the circuit and appellate courts agreed with Dowling, the Illinois Supreme Court reversed and found with DLA Piper. The Illinois State Bar Association and Chicago Bar Association filed amicus curiae briefs in the case, favoring the law firm's position. This decision by the Illinois Supreme Court was the first time the concept of "advance payment retainer" was recognized in the state, and the court codified its ruling into a 2009 regulation affecting legal practice in Illinois.

== History ==
=== Options and futures trading ===
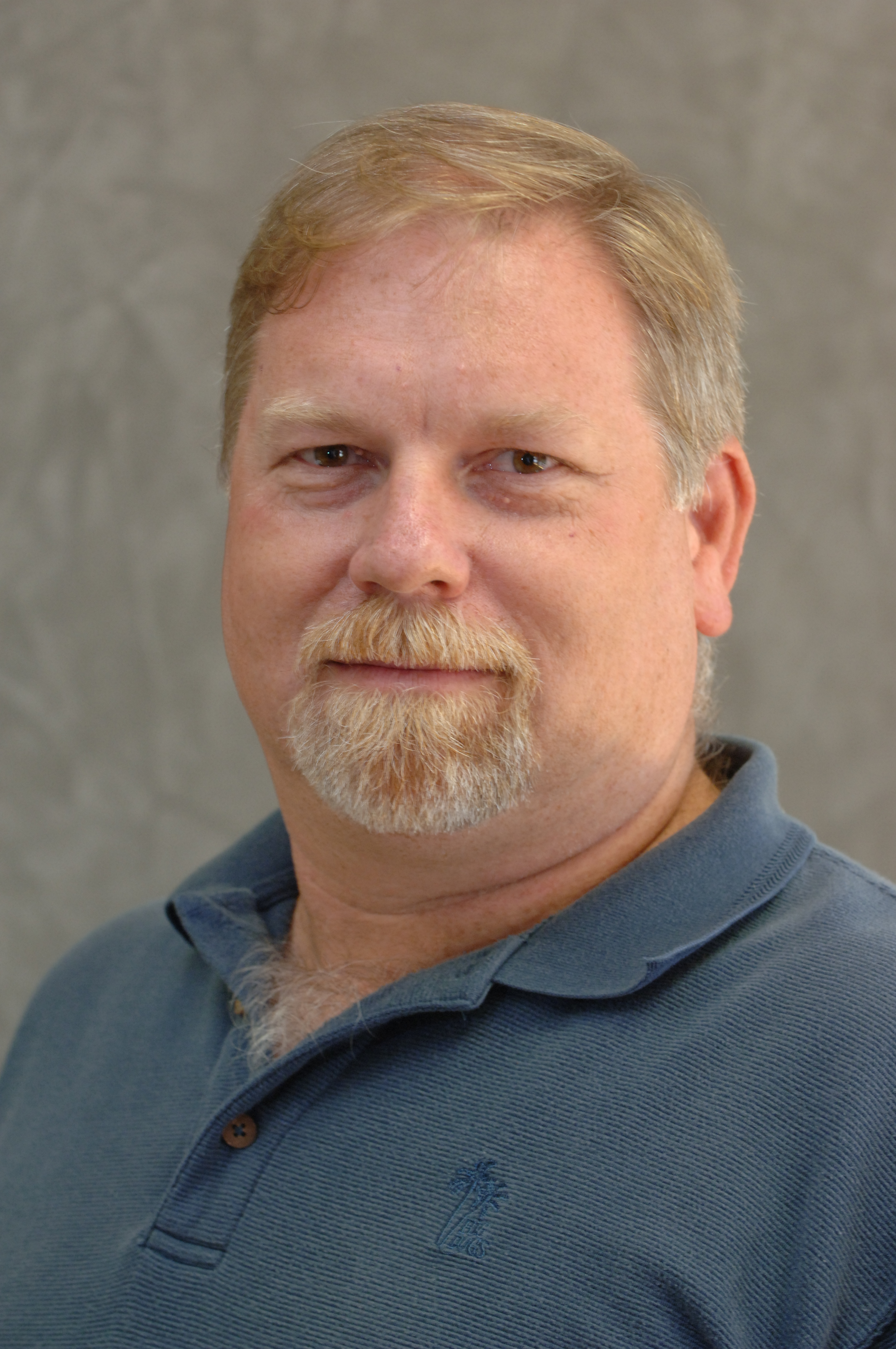
Michael E. Davis in 2006

Chicago Options Associates is a finance company incorporated in Chicago, Illinois, which specializes in trading options and futures contracts. It was founded in 1987 by Michael E. Davis (a 1983 MBA graduate from the University of Chicago) and Oliver R. W. Pergams, who received a bachelor's degree from that school in 1981. The company originally had offices in Chicago and Philadelphia, Pennsylvania. The chief executive officer of Chicago Options Associates in 1994 was Michael Davis, and the company had established a successful reputation in Chicago.

Davis hired Indiana University economics Ph.D. graduate student Jimmy Wales to analyze the company's pricing-model strategy; Wales left his graduate program to join the company as research director, serving in that capacity from 1994 through 1998. He was adept at determining future movements of foreign currencies and interest rates, and Davis mentored Wales in more-aggressive financial trading.

Davis joined Wales and Tim Shell in 1996 to form the Internet company Bomis. In 2003, when Wales decided to form a non-profit organization to manage the website Wikipedia, Davis, Shell and Wales formed the initial three-member Wikimedia Foundation Board of Trustees.

In 2013, Chicago Options Associates was located on LaSalle Street in Chicago.

=== Dowling v Chicago Options Associates, Inc ===
In 2007, the company was the subject of a decision in a lawsuit before the Illinois Supreme Court when a creditor argued that it was owed monies from the defendants after judgments were obtained against them. The court ruled against the creditor and in favor of the law firm, stating that the retainer owed to the firm took precedence. In Dowling v Chicago Options Associates, Inc, the Illinois Supreme Court ruled that preemptive retainers used by attorneys were acceptable arrangements with clients.

The original case was between plaintiff Brian Dowling and defendants Chicago Options Associates and Michael E. Davis, in which Dowling won a judgement of $817,830.45 from the defendants. After the court entered its judgement against him, Davis then tried to shield his assets from the plaintiff using his attorney-client relationship with the law firm of DLA Piper to assist him in buying a home in Florida. As part of this arrangement, Davis transferred funds into a trust account controlled by DLA Piper. At that time, as stated in the contract between DLA Piper and Davis, the law firm was allocated $100,000 of those funds as its retainer; the funds were used to pay day-to-day company expenses.

When Dowling's attorneys learned about the retainer to DLA Piper they asked the court to order the return of the retainer to the plaintiff, and the circuit court ruled in favor of Dowling. On appeal, the decision was upheld. The Illinois Supreme Court reversed the circuit-court decision, ruling that the retainer was the property of DLA Piper and not Dowling.

Both the Illinois State Bar Association and Chicago Bar Association filed amicus curiae briefs in the case favoring the law firm's position. The case dealt with the concept of an advance payment retainer, a fee given to an attorney for later services to a client. An advance payment retainer became part of an attorney's assets as soon as it was paid, regardless of subsequent events. More common types of retainer defined by the court included the classic retainer (also known as a true retainer) and the security retainer. A classic retainer was described by the court as one used in an attorney-client relationship for a set length of time or a particular purpose. A security retainer referred to a deposit kept in a trust account by the attorney, distinct from their own assets. The case was the first recognition of advance payment retainers in Illinois.

The case became a parameter for defining retainers in Illinois. The Illinois Bar Journal observed in 2009, "The starting point for any discussion of getting paid for work in the private practice of law is retainer fees. In Dowling v Chicago Options Associates, Inc ... the supreme court identified three types of lawyer retainer fees that are permissible in this state ..." and referred to the legal descriptions as "Dowling fee classifications".

On July 1, 2009, the Illinois Supreme Court codified the definitions set forth in the case as a rule applicable to the practice of law in the state; known as Rule 1.15(c), it came into practice on January 1, 2010. The Illinois Bar Journal noted, "Paragraph (c) of the rule reflects the recent supreme court decision in Dowling v Chicago Options Associates, Inc (4) and describes in detail the so-called advance payment retainer recognized in Dowling."

== See also ==
- Advance payment
- Bomis
- Chicago Board Options Exchange
- List of companies in the Chicago metropolitan area
- Outline of finance
- Wikimedia Foundation
