= German submarine U-3 =

U-3 may refer to one of the following German submarines:

- SM U-3 (Germany), lead boat of the Type U 3 submarines; launched in 1909 and served in the First World War as a training submarine; surrendered in 1918
  - During the First World War, Germany also had these submarines with similar names:
    - SM UB-3, a Type UB I submarine launched in 1915 and sunk on 23 May 1915
    - SM UC-3, a Type UC I submarine launched in 1915 and sunk on 27 May 1916
- German submarine U-3 (1935), a Type IIA submarine that served in the Second World War and was scrapped in 1945
- German submarine U-3 (S182), a Type 201 submarine of the Bundesmarine that was launched in 1964; loaned out to Royal Norwegian Navy from 1964 to 1966; later broken up

U-3 or U-III may also refer to:

- SM U-3 (Austria-Hungary), lead boat of the U-3-class for the Austro-Hungarian Navy

== See also ==
- U-3 (disambiguation)
