= Advance payment =

Type of payment

An advance payment, or simply an advance, is the part of a contractually due sum that is paid or received in advance for goods or services, while the balance included in the invoice will only follow the delivery. The term "advance" may also refer to a loan.

Under UK social security law, an advance payment may also be made to a person in receipt of Universal Credit.

== Accounting treatment ==
Advance payments are recorded as a prepaid expense in accrual accounting for the entity issuing the advance. Advanced payments are recorded as assets on the balance sheet. As these assets are used they are expended and recorded on the income statement for the period in which they are incurred. Insurance is a common prepaid asset, which will only be a prepaid asset because it is a proactive measure to protect business from unforeseen events.

== Case law ==
Advance payments made as a loan are generally repayable but this is not always the case. In Leibson Corporation and Others v TOC Investments Corporation and Others, an English Court of Appeal case in 2018, it was established following principles of contractual interpretation that, in the absence of any specific language to the contrary, an "advance" is not always repayable.

== See also ==
- Advance against royalties
- Chicago Options Associates
- Pay or play contract
- Prepaid expense
- Signing bonus
