= Deanna Merryman =

American model (born 1972)

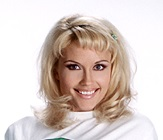
- Merryman in 2000
- Born: 1972 (age 53–54); United States
- Occupations: Actress, glamour model, and fitness model
- Years active: 1992–2006
- Known for: Cover of Iron Man Magazine (1999); Playboy pictorial (2003)
- Modeling information
- Height: 5 ft 5 in (1.65 m)
- Hair color: Auburn
- Eye color: Blue

Deanna Merryman (born 1972) is an American actress, glamour model, and fitness model. She participated in Playboy's Great Lingerie Model Search in 1997 and competed in the Miss Hawaiian Tropic beauty pageant in 1998, later going on to become a model for Hawaiian Tropic. The next year, she was featured on the cover of Iron Man Magazine.

She starred, credited as Deana, on the documentary soap drama Desperately Seeking Stardom in 1999. This garnered her roles on Baywatch and Veronica's Closet. Merryman was featured in a pictorial in the October 2003 issue of Playboy magazine.

== Early life ==
Deanna Merryman was born in 1972. Her father was a clergyman from Virginia. Merryman attended high school with Leeann Tweeden. Merryman worked as an exotic dancer in the mid-1990s. She danced at PT's Show Club in 1992 in San Antonio, Texas, where she was bitten by a patron. She was transported to a hospital where she received treatment for puncture wounds.

== Acting and modeling career ==
Merryman was featured in Playboy magazine in 1997 in Playboy's Great Lingerie Model Search. She was featured in a pictorial in 1998 in a Celebrity Sleuth. In 1998, Merryman was a contestant in the Miss Hawaiian Tropic beauty pageant. She later became a model for Hawaiian Tropic. Merryman worked as a fitness model. She was featured on the cover of Iron Man Magazine in 1999.

She starred in the documentary soap drama Desperately Seeking Stardom in 1999. Broadcast on the ITV network, the program featured six individuals living in a house in California and documented their attempts to become successful actors in Los Angeles. During this time, attempting to gain a foothold in the acting industry, Merryman worked simultaneously as a model for lingerie and a waitress, and was featured in Playboy. The show chronicled her audition process for a horror film, and a role in the television soap opera The Bold and the Beautiful. She successfully landed a role during Desperately Seeking Stardom, on the television show Baywatch. Merryman subsequently gained a part on the television series Veronica's Closet.

In 2000, Merryman was selected for a photo shoot by American photographer Mark Daughn; her pictures were used to advertise the Internet company Bomis. Daughn's photographs of Merryman also appeared in Mystique Magazine in January 2003, alongside models including: Aria Giovanni, Sunny Leone, Lisa Marie Scott, Natasha Yi, and Kalin Olson. She was featured in the book Mystique: Models of Mystique in the same year, photographed by Daughn.

Merryman posed nude in the October 2003 Playboy issue, and was photographed for the publication by Daughn. In May 2004, Merryman appeared onstage at the "Porn Star Ball" at the Uptown Cabaret in Charlotte, North Carolina; she was introduced to the audience by Ron Jeremy. Merryman starred in the 2004 comedy film Busty Cops alongside Nikki Nova, Jesse Jane, Katie James, Sunny Leone and Seana Ryan. She again appeared in a Celebrity Sleuth pictorial in its October 2004 issue. She was photographed by Sam T'Ang for Beach Babes calendar in 2005, and by Daughn for the Mystique calendar published the same year. In 2006, Merryman moved from Los Angeles, California and hosted a party in South Beach, Florida, at Club Deep which was sponsored by FireStar Film Works and Phunhauz Ent. In 2011 she resided in Fort Lauderdale, Florida, where she worked as a makeup artist.

== Personal life ==
Merryman had a relationship with stock car racing driver Jeff Gordon. She first met Gordon in 2000 while she was employed in Palm Beach, Florida, at a Neiman Marcus store in a mall where she advised customers about cosmetics products. At their first meeting, Merryman didn’t recognize the race-car driver, although her friends were excited to see him. Initially Merryman turned down Gordon's request to take her out for lunch. One year after their initial encounter, they began a relationship. They were romantically-linked for 11 months. Merryman and Gordon vacationed together in Saint-Jean, Saint Barthélemy in the Caribbean in January 2003 to celebrate the New Year. This relationship caused difficulty for his then-ongoing marriage to Brooke Sealy. Sealy found out about Gordon’s relationship with Merryman and later divorced the race-car driver. Gordon's wife, who also went by the name Jennifer Brooke Gordon, cited Merryman by name in her divorce papers with the racecar driver. Merryman was featured in the October 2003 issue of Playboy magazine, where she was interviewed about her relationship with Gordon. Merryman stated that Gordon had confided in her: "He got married when he was 23 and has been on the racetrack since he was a kid. He used to tell me all the time he never had a chance to have fun." She reflected on what she had learned after her period of time with Gordon, saying in the future she would avoid relationships both with men of his occupation and those who were married. Gordon did not comment on Merryman's 2003 appearance in the magazine.

== Filmography ==
=== Film ===
| Year | Film | Role | Notes |
|---|---|---|---|
| 1994 | Sorority Slaughter | | Director: Gary Whitson |
| 1996 | Sorority Slaughter | | Director: Gary Whitson |
| 2000 | Hot Body Competition: Malibu Miniskirt Finals | Chase | Director: John Cross |
| 2000 | Sexy Swimsuit Spectacular #5 | Self | Iron Man Magazine production |
| 2002 | Models of Mystique Volume One | Featured model | Infinity Studios Inc. |
| 2003 | Models of Mystique Volume Seven | Featured model | Infinity Studios Inc. |
| 2003 | Models of Mystique Volume Nine | Featured model | Infinity Studios Inc. |
| 2004 | Lingerie: The Secret Art of Seduction | Self | Infinity Studios production |
| 2004 | Busty Cops | Licka Lottapuss | Director: Jim Wynorski (as Harold Blueberry) |
| 2004 | Mystique Presents H2Ohh | Credited cast member | Infinity Studios production |
| 2005 | Alabama Jones and the Busty Crusade | The Curator | Director: Jim Wynorski (as Harold Blueberry) |
| 2006 | Busty Cops 2 | Licka Lottapuss | Director: Jim Wynorski (as Harold Blueberry) |
| 2006 | Nikki Nova's Sex on the Beach | | WPOE Entertainment Studio |

=== Television ===
| Year | Title | Role | Notes |
|---|---|---|---|
| 1998 | Hot Springs Hotel | Carla | Episodes: 1.07, 1.09, 1.13–1.15 |
| 1998 | Hot Springs Hotel | Telegram Girl | Episode: 1.01 |
| 1999 | Desperately Seeking Stardom (also known as Hollywood Fame) | Model | Broadcast on ITV |
| 1999 | Baywatch | | |
| 1999 | Veronica's Closet | | |
| 2003 | Howard Stern | Self | Episode: September 11, 2003 |
| 2004 | 10 Things Every Guy Should Experience | Ring Girl | Episode: 1.03 |
| 2005 | Lingerie Bowl | Self, L.A. Temptation #2 | Director: Mitch Mortaza |
| 2005 | Poorman's Bikini Beach | Self | Episode: 7.10 |

== See also ==
- Los Angeles Temptation
