= Wayback Machine =

Digital archive by the Internet Archive

- Website type: Archiving service
- Founded: October 25, 2001; 25 years ago
- Area served: Worldwide (except China and North Korea)
- Owner: Internet Archive
- Website: web.archive.org
- Commercial: No
- Registration: Optional
- Current status: Active
- Written in: HTML, CSS, JavaScript, Java, Python

The Wayback Machine is a digital archive of the World Wide Web founded by the Internet Archive, an American nonprofit organization based in San Francisco, California. Launched for public access on October 25, 2001, the service allows users to go "back in time" to see how its catalogued websites looked in the past.

Founders Brewster Kahle and Bruce Gilliat developed the Wayback Machine to provide "universal access to all knowledge" by preserving archived copies of defunct web pages. The name is a reference to the fictional time-traveling device of the same name from the animated cartoon The Adventures of Rocky and Bullwinkle and Friends, which ran from 1959 to 1964. In a segment of the cartoon titled "Peabody's Improbable History", the characters Mr. Peabody and Sherman use the "Wayback Machine" to travel back in time to witness and participate in famous historical events.

The Wayback Machine's earliest archives go back at least to 1995; by the end of 2009, more than 38.2 billion web pages had been saved. As of October 2025, the Wayback Machine has archived more than 1 trillion web pages and well over 99 petabytes of data.

== History ==
The Internet Archive has been archiving cached web pages since at least 1995. The earliest known page (a landing page for the BBC) was archived by the Wayback Machine on March 1, 1995.

Internet Archive founders Brewster Kahle and Bruce Gilliat launched the Wayback Machine in San Francisco, California, in October 2001, primarily to address the problem of web content vanishing whenever it gets changed or when a website is shut down. The service enables users to see archived versions of web pages across time, which the archive calls a "three-dimensional index". Kahle and Gilliat created the machine hoping to archive the entire Internet and provide "universal access to all knowledge".

From 1996 to 2001, the information was kept on digital tape, with Kahle occasionally allowing researchers and scientists to tap into the "clunky" database. When the archive reached its fifth anniversary in 2001, it was unveiled and opened to the public in a ceremony at the University of California, Berkeley. By the time the Wayback Machine launched, it already contained over 10 billion archived pages. The data is stored on the Internet Archive's large cluster of Linux nodes. It revisits and archives new versions of websites on occasion (see technical details below). Sites can also be captured manually by entering a website's URL into the search box, provided that the website allows the Wayback Machine to "crawl" it and save the data.

The Internet Archive migrated its customized storage architecture to Sun Open Storage in 2009, and hosts a new data centre in a Sun Modular Datacenter on Sun Microsystems' California campus.

A new, improved version of the Wayback Machine, with an updated interface and a fresher index of archived content, was made available for public testing in 2011. In this upgrade, captures appear in a calendar layout with circles whose width visualizes the number of crawls each day; however, there is no marking of duplicates with asterisks or an advanced search page. A top toolbar was added to facilitate navigating between captures. A bar chart visualizes the frequency of captures per month over the years. Features like "Changes", "Summary", and a graphical site map were added subsequently.

In October 2013, Wayback Machine introduced the "Save Page Now" feature, which allows any Internet user to archive the contents of a URL, and quickly generates a permanent link unlike the preceding liveweb feature.

On October 30, 2020, the Wayback Machine began fact-checking content. As of January 2022, domains of ad servers are disabled from capturing.

In May 2021, for Internet Archive's 25th anniversary, the Wayback Machine introduced the "Wayforward Machine", which allows users to "travel to the Internet in 2046, where knowledge is under siege".

Trouble with archiving projects resulted in an 87 percent drop in page captures among news publications from May to October 2025. By February 2026, a number of news organizations, such as The Guardian and the New York Times, had started blocking the Wayback Machine due to concerns over AI scraping of captures. The Internet Archive has responded to concerns, highlighting the importance of digital preservation. Over 100 journalists voiced support for the Wayback Machine.

== Technical information ==
The Wayback Machine's software has been developed to "crawl" the Web and download all publicly accessible information and data files on web pages, the Gopher hierarchy, the Netnews (Usenet) bulletin board system, and software. The information collected by these 'crawlers' does not include all the content available on the Internet since much of the data is restricted by the publisher or stored in databases that are not accessible. To overcome inconsistencies in partially cached websites, Archive-It.org was developed in 2005 by the Internet Archive as a means of allowing institutions and content creators to voluntarily harvest and preserve collections of digital content and create digital archives.

Crawls are contributed from various sources; some are imported from third parties, while others are generated internally by the Archive. For example, content comes from crawls contributed by the Sloan Foundation and Alexa, crawls run by the Internet Archive on behalf of NARA and the Internet Memory Foundation, web pages archived by Archive Team, and mirrors of Common Crawl. The "Worldwide Web Crawls" have been running since 2010 and capture the global Web. In September 2020, the Internet Archive announced a partnership with Cloudflare – an American content delivery network service provider – to automatically index websites served via its "Always Online" services.

Documents and resources are stored with time stamp URLs such as 20261121042333. Pages' individual resources, such as images, style sheets and scripts, as well as outgoing hyperlinks, are linked to with the time stamp of the currently viewed page, so they are redirected automatically to their individual captures that are the closest in time.

The frequency of snapshot captures varies per website. Websites in the "Worldwide Web Crawls" are included in a "crawl list", with the site archived once per crawl. A crawl can take months or even years to complete, depending on size. For example, "Wide Crawl Number 13" started on January 9, 2015, and was completed on July 11, 2016. However, there may be multiple crawls ongoing at any one time, and a site might be included in more than one crawl list; as such, how often a site is crawled varies widely.

Starting in October 2019, users were limited to 15 archival requests and retrievals per minute.

=== Storage capacity and growth ===
Wayback Machine growth
Wayback Machine by year	Pages archived
2004	30,000,000,000(0–100B: Light blue)
2005	40,000,000,000
2008	85,000,000,000
2012	150,000,000,000(100B–450B: Yellow)
2013	373,000,000,000
2014	400,000,000,000
2015	452,000,000,000(450B–600B: Orange)
2016	459,000,000,000
2017	279,000,000,000
2018	310,000,000,000
2019	345,000,000,000
2020	405,000,000,000
2021	514,000,000,000
2022	640,000,000,000(600B–: Red)
2023	835,000,000,000
2024	946,000,000,000
2025	1,000,000,000,000

As technology has developed over the years, the storage capacity of the Wayback Machine has grown. In 2003, after only two years of public access, the Wayback Machine was growing at a rate of 12 terabytes per month. The data is stored on PetaBox rack systems custom designed by Internet Archive staff. The first 100 TB rack became fully operational in June 2004, although it soon became clear that they would need much more storage than that.

As of 2009, the Wayback Machine contained approximately three petabytes of data and was growing at a rate of 100 terabytes each month.

In March 2009, it was said on the Wayback Machine forum that "the Beta of the new Wayback Machine has a more complete and up-to-date index of all crawled materials into 2010, and will continue to be updated regularly. The index driving the classic Wayback Machine only has a little bit of material past 2008, and no further index updates are planned, as it will be phased out this year." Also in 2011, the Internet Archive installed their sixth pair of PetaBox racks which increased the Wayback Machine's storage capacity by 700 terabytes.

In January 2013, Internet Archive announced a milestone of 240 billion URLs.

In December 2014, the Wayback Machine contained 435 billion web pages—almost nine petabytes of data, and was growing at about 20 terabytes a week.

In July 2016, the Wayback Machine reportedly contained around 15 petabytes of data. In October 2016, it was announced that the way web pages are counted would be changed, resulting in the decrease of the archived pages counts shown. Embedded objects such as pictures, videos, style sheets, JavaScripts are no longer counted as a "web page", whereas HTML, PDF, and plain text documents remain counted.

In September 2018, the Wayback Machine contained over 25 petabytes of data. As of December 2020, the Wayback Machine contained over 70 petabytes of data.

In 2025, Wayback Machine reached 1 trillion web pages archived, with a series of events being scheduled throughout October to celebrate it.

=== Wayback Machine APIs ===
The Wayback Machine service offers three public APIs, SavePageNow, Availability, and CDX. SavePageNow can be used to archive web pages. Availability API for checking the archive availability status for a web page, checking whether an archive for the web page exists or not. CDX API is for complex querying, filtering, and analysis of captured data.

=== Website exclusion policy ===
Historically, the Wayback Machine has respected the robots exclusion standard (robots.txt) in determining if a website would be crawled – or if already crawled, if its archives would be publicly viewable. Website owners had the option to opt out of Wayback Machine through the use of robots.txt. It applied robots.txt rules retroactively; if a site blocked the Internet Archive, any previously archived pages from the domain were immediately rendered unavailable as well. In addition, the Internet Archive stated that "Sometimes, a website owner will contact us directly and ask us to stop crawling or archiving a site. We comply with these requests." In addition, the website says: "The Internet Archive is not interested in preserving or offering access to Web sites or other internet documents of persons who do not want their materials in the collection."

Citing an upsurge in sites that had gone defunct and became parked domains that were using robots.txt to exclude themselves from search engines, resulting in their exclusion from the Wayback Machine, the Internet Archive changed the policy on April 17, 2017, to require an explicit exclusion request to remove sites from the Wayback Machine.

==== The Oakland Archive Policy ====
Wayback's retroactive exclusion policy is based in part upon Recommendations for Managing Removal Requests and Preserving Archival Integrity, known as The Oakland Archive Policy, published by the School of Information Management and Systems at University of California, Berkeley in 2002, which gives a website owner the right to block access to the site's archives. Wayback has complied with this policy to help avoid expensive litigation.

The Wayback retroactive exclusion policy began to relax in 2017, when it stopped honoring robots on U.S. government and military web sites for both crawling and displaying web pages. As of April 2017, Wayback is ignoring robots.txt more broadly, not just for U.S. government websites.

== Uses ==
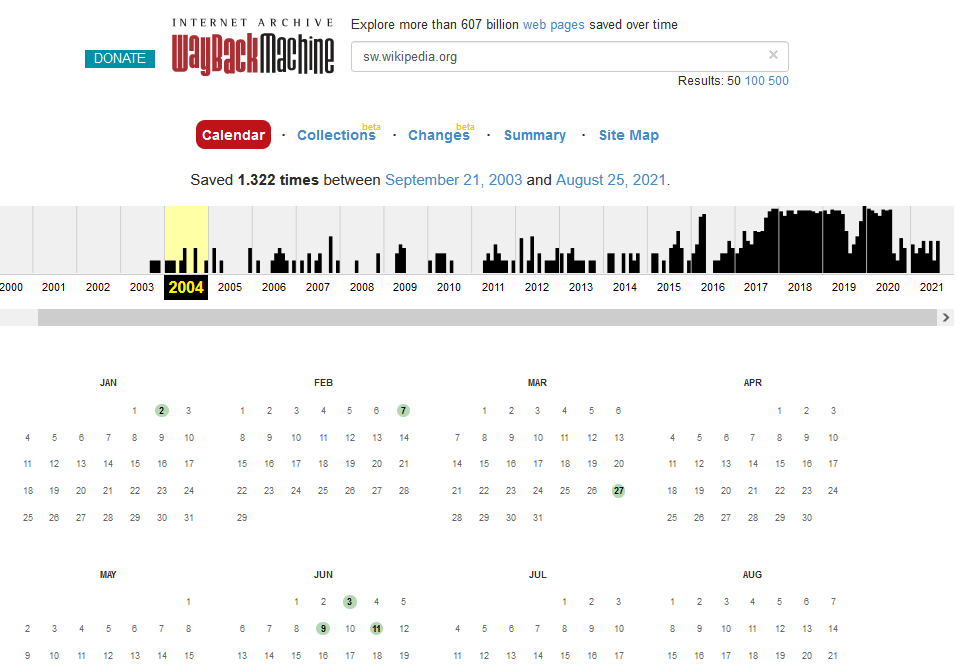
The Wayback Machine showing available archives for the Swahili Wikipedia

From its public launch in 2001, the Wayback Machine has been studied by scholars both for the ways it stores and collects data and for the actual pages contained in its archive. As of 2013, scholars had written about 350 articles on the Wayback Machine, mostly from the information technology, library science, and social science fields. Social science scholars have used the Wayback Machine to analyze how the development of websites from the mid-1990s to the present has affected the growth of companies.

When the Wayback Machine archives a page, it usually includes most of the hyperlinks, keeping those links active when they just as easily could have been broken by the Internet's instability. Researchers in India studied the effectiveness of the Wayback Machine's ability to save hyperlinks in online scholarly publications and found that it saved slightly more than half of them.

Journalists have used the Wayback Machine to view dead, dated, and changed web content; USNWR reports that "[its] content has been used to hold politicians accountable and expose battlefield lies." In 2014, an archived social media page of Igor Girkin, a separatist rebel leader in Ukraine, showed him boasting about his troops having shot down a suspected Ukrainian military airplane before it became known that the plane actually was a civilian Malaysian Airlines jet (Malaysia Airlines Flight 17), after which he deleted the post and blamed Ukraine's military for downing the plane. In 2017, the March for Science originated from a discussion on Reddit that indicated someone had visited Archive.org and discovered that all references to climate change had been deleted from the White House website. In response, a user commented, "There needs to be a Scientists' March on Washington".

The site is used heavily for verification, providing access to references and content creation by Wikipedia editors. When new URLs are added to Wikipedia, the Internet Archive has been archiving them.

In September 2020, a partnership was announced with Cloudflare to automatically archive websites served via its "Always Online" service, which will also allow it to direct users to its copy of the site if it cannot reach the original host.

=== Limitations ===
In 2014, there was a six-month lag time between when a website was crawled and when it became available for viewing in the Wayback Machine. As of 2024, the lag time is 3 to 10 hours. The Wayback Machine offers only limited search facilities. Its "Site Search" feature allows users to find a site based on words describing the site, rather than words found on the web pages themselves.

The Wayback Machine does not include every web page ever made due to the various limitations of web crawling. The Wayback Machine cannot completely archive web pages that contain interactive features such as Flash platforms and forms written in JavaScript and progressive web applications, because those functions require interaction with the host website. This means that, since approximately July 9, 2013, the Wayback Machine has been unable to display YouTube comments when saving videos' watch pages, as, according to the Archive Team, comments are no longer "loaded within the page itself." The Wayback Machine's web crawler has difficulty extracting anything not coded in HTML or one of its variants, which can often result in broken hyperlinks and missing images. Due to this, the web crawler cannot archive "orphan pages" that are not linked to by other pages. The Wayback Machine's crawler only follows a predetermined number of hyperlinks based on a preset depth limit, so it cannot archive every hyperlink on every page.

=== In legal evidence ===
==== Civil litigation ====
===== Netbula LLC v. Chordiant Software Inc. =====
In a 2009 case, Netbula, LLC v. Chordiant Software Inc., defendant Chordiant filed a motion to compel Netbula to disable the robots.txt file on its website that was causing the Wayback Machine to retroactively remove access to previous versions of pages it had archived from Netbula's site, pages that Chordiant believed would support its case.

Netbula objected to the motion on the ground that defendants were asking to alter Netbula's website and that they should have subpoenaed Internet Archive for the pages directly. An employee of Internet Archive filed a sworn statement supporting Chordiant's motion, however, stating that it could not produce the web pages by any other means "without considerable burden, expense and disruption to its operations."

Magistrate Judge Howard Lloyd in the Northern District of California, San Jose Division, rejected Netbula's arguments and ordered them to disable the robots.txt blockage temporarily in order to allow Chordiant to retrieve the archived pages that they sought.

===== Telewizja Polska USA, Inc. v. Echostar Satellite =====
In an October 2004 case, Telewizja Polska USA, Inc. v. Echostar Satellite, No. 02 C 3293, 65 Fed. R. Evid. Serv. 673 (N.D. Ill. October 15, 2004), a litigant attempted to use the Wayback Machine archives as a source of admissible evidence, perhaps for the first time. Telewizja Polska is the provider of TVP Polonia and EchoStar operates the Dish Network. Prior to the trial proceedings, EchoStar indicated that it intended to offer Wayback Machine snapshots as proof of the past content of Telewizja Polska's website. Telewizja Polska brought a motion in limine to suppress the snapshots on the grounds of hearsay and unauthenticated source, but Magistrate Judge Arlander Keys rejected Telewizja Polska's assertion of hearsay and denied TVP's motion in limine to exclude the evidence at trial. At the trial, however, District Court Judge Ronald Guzman, the trial judge, overruled Magistrate Keys' findings, and held that neither the affidavit of the Internet Archive employee nor the underlying pages (i.e., the Telewizja Polska website) were admissible as evidence. Judge Guzman reasoned that the employee's affidavit contained both hearsay and inconclusive supporting statements, and the purported web page, printouts were not self-authenticating.

==== Patent law ====
The United States Patent and Trademark Office and the European Patent Office will accept date stamps from the Internet Archive as evidence of when a given Web page was accessible to the public. These dates are used to determine if a Web page is available as prior art for instance in examining a patent application.

==== Limitations of utility ====
There are technical limitations to archiving a website; as a consequence, opposing parties in litigation can misuse the results provided by website archives. This problem can be exacerbated by the practice of submitting screenshots of web pages in complaints, answers, or expert witness reports when the underlying links are not exposed and therefore, can contain errors. For example, archives such as the Wayback Machine do not fill out forms and therefore, do not include the contents of non-RESTful e-commerce databases in their archives.

== Legal status ==
In Europe, the Wayback Machine could be interpreted as violating copyright laws. Only the content creator can decide where their content is published or duplicated so the Archive would have to delete pages from its system upon request of the creator. The exclusion policies for the Wayback Machine may be found in the FAQ section of the site.

Some cases have been brought against the Internet Archive specifically for its Wayback Machine archiving efforts.

== Archived content legal issues ==
=== Scientology ===
In late 2002, the Internet Archive removed various sites that were critical of Scientology from the Wayback Machine. An error message stated that this was in response to a "request by the site owner". Later, it was clarified that lawyers from the Church of Scientology had demanded the removal and that the site owners did not want their material removed.

=== Healthcare Advocates, Inc. ===
In 2003, Harding Earley Follmer & Frailey defended a client from a trademark dispute using the Archive's Wayback Machine. The attorneys were able to demonstrate that the claims made by the plaintiff were invalid, based on the content of their website from several years prior. The plaintiff, Healthcare Advocates, then amended their complaint to include the Internet Archive, accusing the organization of copyright infringement as well as violations of the DMCA and the Computer Fraud and Abuse Act. Healthcare Advocates claimed that, since they had installed a robots.txt file on their website, even if after the initial lawsuit was filed, the Archive should have removed all previous copies of the plaintiff website from the Wayback Machine; however, some material continued to be publicly visible on Wayback. The lawsuit was settled out of court after Wayback fixed the problem.

=== Suzanne Shell ===
Activist Suzanne Shell filed suit in December 2005, demanding Internet Archive pay her US$100,000 for archiving her website profane-justice.org between 1999 and 2004. Internet Archive filed a declaratory judgment action in the United States District Court for the Northern District of California on January 20, 2006, seeking a judicial determination that Internet Archive did not violate Shell's copyright. Shell responded and brought a countersuit against Internet Archive for archiving her site, which she alleges is in violation of her terms of service. On February 13, 2007, a judge for the United States District Court for the District of Colorado dismissed all counterclaims except breach of contract. The Internet Archive did not move to dismiss the copyright infringement claims that Shell asserted arose out of its copying activities, which would also go forward.

On April 25, 2007, Internet Archive and Suzanne Shell jointly announced the settlement of their lawsuit. The Internet Archive said it "...has no interest in including materials in the Wayback Machine of persons who do not wish to have their Web content archived. We recognize that Ms. Shell has a valid and enforceable copyright in her Web site and we regret that the inclusion of her Web site in the Wayback Machine resulted in this litigation." Shell said, "I respect the historical value of Internet Archive's goal. I never intended to interfere with that goal nor cause it any harm."

=== Daniel Davydiuk ===
Between 2013 and 2016, Daniel Davydiuk, a pornographic actor, tried to remove archived images of himself from the Wayback Machine's archive, first by sending multiple DMCA requests to the archive, and then by appealing to the Federal Court of Canada. The images were removed from the website in 2017.

=== FlexiSpy ===
In 2018, archives of stalkerware application FlexiSpy's website were removed from the Wayback Machine. The company claimed to have contacted the Internet Archive, presumably to remove the archives of its website.

== Censorship and other threats ==
Archive.org is blocked in China. The Internet Archive was blocked in its entirety in Russia in 2015–16, ostensibly for hosting a Jihad outreach video. Since 2016, the website has been back, available in its entirety, although in 2016 Russian commercial lobbyists were suing the Internet Archive to ban it on copyright grounds.

Alison Macrina, director of the Library Freedom Project, notes that "while librarians deeply value individual privacy, we also strongly oppose censorship".

There is at least one case in which an article was removed from the archive shortly after it had been removed from its original website. A Daily Beast reporter had written an article that outed several gay Olympian athletes in 2016 after the reporter had made a fake profile posing as a gay man on a dating app. The Daily Beast removed the article after it was met with widespread furor; not long after, the Internet Archive soon did as well, and stated that they did so for no other reason than to protect the safety of the outed athletes.

Other threats include natural disasters, destruction (both remote and physical), manipulation of the archive's contents, problematic copyright laws, and surveillance of the site's users.

Alexander Rose, executive director of the Long Now Foundation, suspects that in the long term of multiple generations "next to nothing" will survive in a useful way, stating, "If we have continuity in our technological civilization, I suspect a lot of the bare data will remain findable and searchable. But I suspect almost nothing of the format in which it was delivered will be recognizable" because sites "with deep back-ends of content-management systems like Drupal and Ruby and Django" are harder to archive.

In 2016, in an article reflecting on the preservation of human knowledge, The Atlantic has commented that the Internet Archive, which describes itself to be built for the long-term, "is working furiously to capture data before it disappears without any long-term infrastructure to speak of."

In November 2019, a sitewide purge for the domain youtube.com was performed in which all YouTube video page snapshots between October 8, 2019, and October 29, 2019, inclusive, were deleted.

In September 2024, the Internet Archive suffered a data breach that exposed 31 million records containing personal information, including email addresses and hashed passwords. On October 9, 2024, the site went down due to a distributed denial-of-service attack. On October 14, the site returned online, but it remained in read-only mode until November 4, during which time "Save Page Now" was disabled, replaced with a "Temporarily Unavailable" banner.

In November 2025, the Internet Archive displayed a "temporarily offline" message that directed people to social media for updates following a massive internet-wide disruption involving Cloudflare on November 18, 2025.

== See also ==
- Anna's Archive – Shadow library search engine
- archive.today – Web archiving service
- Heritrix – Web crawler designed for web archiving
- Library Genesis – File-sharing website for publications
- Link rot – URLs ceasing to function
- List of web archiving initiatives
- Time capsule – Historic objects of goods or information
- Z-Library – File-sharing website for journal articles, books, and magazines
