= Suzanne Shell =

American activist

Donna Suzanne Shell (née Ostrum; born c. 1957) is an American activist critical of child protective services.

Shell grew up in Minnesota. Her first experience with child protective services occurred in 1974, when at age 17 she was punched in the face by her father. That year, she was put in a foster home and gave birth to a baby she gave up for adoption. She became involved in dependency and neglect cases after Elbert County, Colorado, took away one of her children in 1991 for an alleged spanking by his stepfather that she claimed "left no marks." The child was returned after four days with no further action. Since that time she has assisted other families facing court-ordered sanctions. Shell runs a website called Profane Justice and has also published a book by the same title.

In 2002, she told a reporter "I don't think they should ever terminate parental rights without proof that a child has been seriously hurt."

== Legal cases ==
In March 2004, the Colorado Supreme Court cited Shell for contempt of court for ignoring a 2001 order to stop practicing law without a license. In 2006 the citation was upheld by the Colorado Supreme Court, and Shell was fined $6,000.

In 2005, Shell filed suit on behalf of herself and April Fields in Colorado District Court against several officials connected with Child Protective Services. The case was dismissed by the U.S. District Court for the District of Colorado, and was a subject for her 2006 contempt citation by the state Supreme Court, as she was found to have attempted to represent Fields in the court without a license to practice law.

On December 12, 2005, Shell demanded Internet Archive pay her $100,000 for archiving her website between 1999 and 2004. Internet Archive filed a declaratory judgment Action in the United States District Court for the Northern District of California on January 20, 2006 seeking a judicial determination that Internet Archive did not violate Shell’s copyright. Shell responded and brought a countersuit against Internet Archive for archiving her site, which she alleges is in violation of her terms of service. On February 13, 2007, a judge for the United States District Court for the District of Colorado dismissed all counterclaims except breach of contract. The Internet Archive did not move to dismiss copyright infringement claims Shell asserted arising out of its copying activities. On April 25, 2007 Internet Archive and Shell jointly announced the settlement of their lawsuit. The Internet Archive said, "Internet Archive has no interest in including materials in the Wayback Machine of persons who do not wish to have their Web content archived. We recognize that Ms. Shell has a valid and enforceable copyright in her Web site and we regret that the inclusion of her Web site in the Wayback Machine resulted in this litigation. We are happy to have this case behind us." Shell stated, "I respect the historical value of Internet Archive's goal. I never intended to interfere with that goal nor cause it any harm."

On February 13, 2009, Shell filed a copyright infringement lawsuit in U.S. District Court in Denver against 30 individuals and organizations. As of November 2011, the case is now over, all of the defendants (Except Leonard Henderson) have been dropped from the lawsuit.
