= 3U =

3U or 3-U may refer to:

- Sichuan Airlines's IATA code
- A type of Rack unit
- Zerstörergeschwader 26, from its historic Geschwaderkennung code with the Luftwaffe in World War II
- A CubeSat measuring 30×10×10 cm
- The acronym for the third (3rd) catalog of Uhuru x-ray sources

== See also ==
- U3 (disambiguation)
