= U3 =

U3 or U-3 may refer to:

== People ==
- U3 (ゆうみ), Japanese illustrator known for her work on Frontwing games including Grisaia: Phantom Trigger

== Transportation ==
- U3, an underground rapid transit line in many major German/Austrian cities:
  - U3 (Berlin U-Bahn)
  - U3 (Frankfurt U-Bahn)
  - U3 (Hamburg U-Bahn)
  - U3 (Munich U-Bahn)
  - U3 (Nuremberg U-Bahn)
  - U3 (Stuttgart Stadtbahn)
  - U3 (Vienna U-Bahn)
- London Buses route U3
- Avies (IATA code: U3), an Estonian airline
- Cessna U-3, the military model of the Cessna 310 aircraft
- German submarine U-3, one of several German submarines
- Boeing Customer Code for Garuda Indonesia

== Computer technology ==
- U3 (software), a design specification for USB storage, created by U3, LLC
- U3, a speed class for Secure Digital (SD) cards
- U.3, an improvement to the U.2 storage interface standard

== Video games ==
- Ultima III: Exodus, a 1983 video game
- Uncharted 3: Drake's Deception, a 2011 video game

== Other ==
- U3, an unemployment figure released by the United States Bureau of Labor Statistics
- Small nucleolar RNA U3, a type of non-coding RNA
- U3, a definable user mode (like program with preset) on many Nikon DSLRs and MILCs

== See also ==
- 3U (disambiguation)
