= Brian Bergstein =

American journalist

Brian Bergstein is the National Technology Editor for the American Associated Press news agency, based in Boston, Massachusetts. His work focuses mainly on the economic, legal, and social implications of upcoming technologies.

== Personal ==
He is a graduate of Northwestern University. Bergstein was raised in Los Angeles, California. He, his wife, and two children currently live in Brookline, Massachusetts.

== Awards and honors ==
From 2004 to 2005, he held one of the Knight Science Journalism Fellowships.

== Career ==
Bergstein has been a technology journalist for 13 years. He has worked on the Web, computing, telecom, and in the business of technology from Silicon Valley, New York, and Boston. Previously a technology writer for the Associated Press's New York bureau, Bergstein was promoted to Technology Editor in mid-2008 when the AP reorganised to cover stories by topic rather than geographical areas. He has worked as a journalism instructor at Boston University. He is also deputy editor of MIT Technology Review.
