= First Wikipedia edit =

2001 Wikipedia edit on its homepage

The first edit in the online encyclopedia Wikipedia's database, to HomePage (Wikipedia's home page), was made on January 15, 2001, at 19:27 (UTC), and stated in its entirety "This is the new WikiPedia!" In 2019, co-founder Jimmy Wales said that there had been earlier edits that could not be recovered and that the first words were the text "Hello, World!". In December 2021, Wales announced that he would sell a website containing a re-creation of this first edit to the highest bidder as a non-fungible token (NFT).

== Background ==
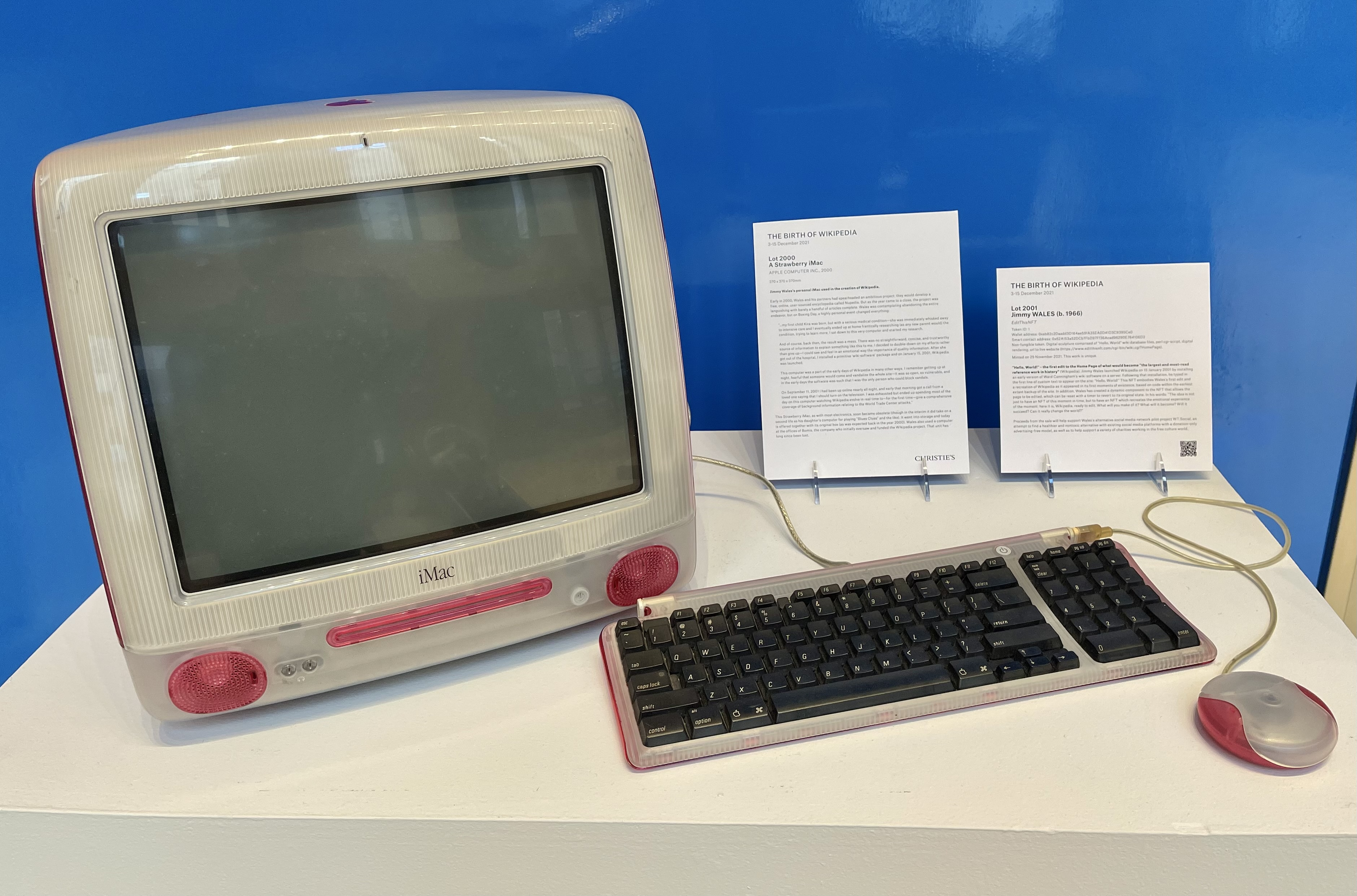
Jimmy Wales' iMac used to make the first edit to Wikipedia

The concept of a collaboratively written, freely licensed hypertext encyclopedia was first posited in the 1990s; Richard Stallman proposed a "Free Universal Encyclopedia and Learning Resource" in 1998. In 2001, Larry Sanger conceived of Wikipedia as a source of volunteer entries from the general public that could then be "fed into" Nupedia, a collaborative encyclopedia founded by Jimmy Wales and written by "qualified volunteer contributors" with a multi-step peer review process. A message sent by Sanger to the Nupedia mailing list said "Humor me [...] go there and add a little article. It will take all of five or ten minutes". On January 13, 2001, Wikipedia's domain name was registered, and on January 15, 2001, Wikipedia was launched.

== First edit ==
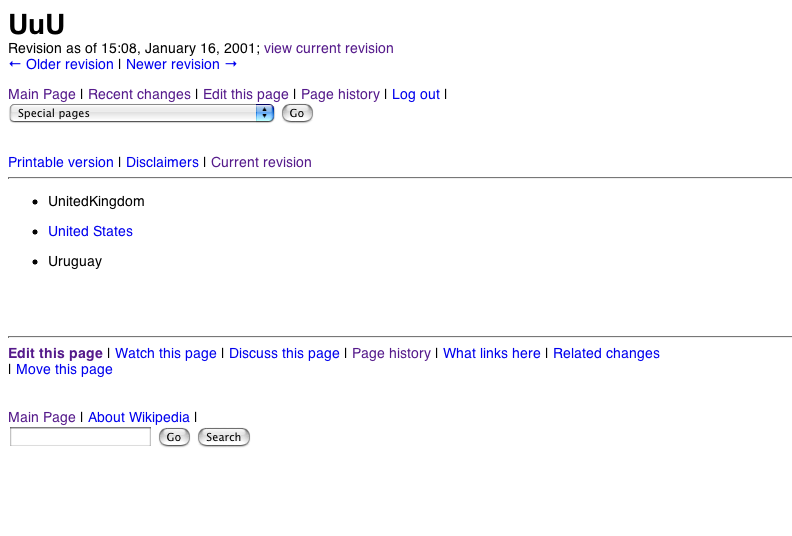
The January 16, 2001 (UTC), edit of "UuU" that was formerly the earliest-surviving edit in the Wikipedia database

Historically, the earliest surviving edit on Wikipedia's database was a revision of the page UuU from January 16, 2001, at 20:08 (UTC), created as a list of countries starting with the letter U and oddly titled due to software considerations of the time. However, page histories during that time were unreliably stored by the UseModWiki software; in 2010, previously inaccessible records of early UseModWiki revisions were found in archives by Wikimedia developer Tim Starling. When these edits were imported into Wikipedia's database at 02:28, July 30, 2019 (UTC), its earliest recorded edit became the January 15, 2001, creation of HomePage with the text "This is the new WikiPedia!" by an anonymous person using the office.bomis.com server. On being informed of the importation of these edits, Wales said:

For the record, these are the earliest edits that have been found, but not the earliest edits. In the early days of Usemod wiki, I did a lot of deleting things *on the hard drive* (as this was the only way to really do that). Those will never be found of course. The first words, soon deleted, were "Hello, World!"

== Non-fungible token sale ==
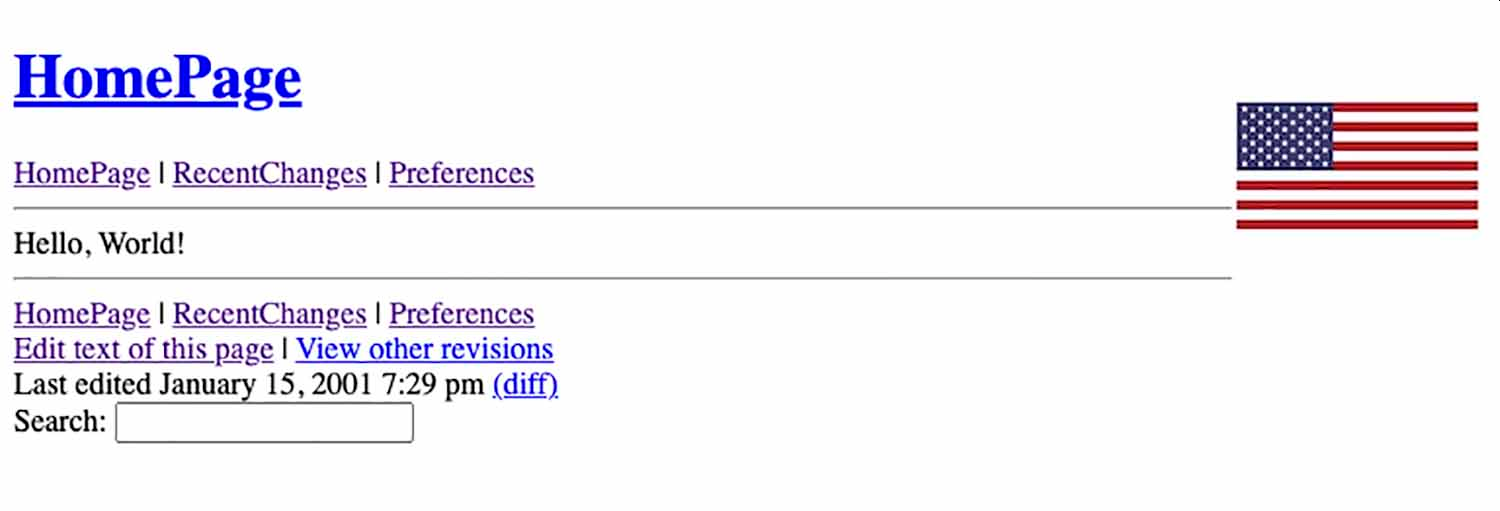
A re-creation of the "Hello, World!" edit, as auctioned by Christie's for US$750,000

On December 3, 2021, Wales announced that he would be selling, through auction house Christie's, a non-fungible token (NFT) of a re-creation of what he claimed to be the first Wikipedia edit, made earlier than the "This is the new WikiPedia!" edit. Wales' edit, whose timestamp was listed as 18:29 UTC on January 15, 2001, was on the page HomePage. It consisted of the text "Hello, World!"; it was made as a test and subsequently erased.

The product being sold was not actual ownership of the edit (as Wikipedia content is released under a copyleft license), but rather a "digital item" that records the purchaser's name alongside a URL of the edit and by itself confers the owner no special rights. However, plans were made to set up a website, "Edit This NFT", mirroring only the original page; the purchaser would be allowed to edit it. It sold for US$750,000.

Numerous Wikipedia editors objected to the sale on various grounds. Some editors, including administrators, argued that Wales' use of his own user profile page to advertise the sale was a violation of Wikipedia guidelines against self-promotion. Other editors criticized the sale on the grounds that the artificial scarcity of NFTs is incompatible with Wikipedia's open-source free knowledge principles. They were broadly not opposed to Wales selling the iMac he used at the time, but objected to the NFT for representing what they perceived as monetization encroaching onto the platform.
