= Deletion of articles on Wikipedia =

Community processes of deleting articles

The mop symbolizes the work done by administrators – they "clean up" Wikipedia, which can include deleting articles.

Volunteer editors of Wikipedia delete articles from the online encyclopedia regularly, following processes that have been formulated by the site's community over time. The most common route is the outright deletion of articles that clearly violate the rules of the website (speedy deletion). Other mechanisms include an intermediate collaborative process that bypasses a complete discussion (proposed deletion or PROD), and a whole debate at the dedicated forum called Articles for deletion (AfD). As a technical action, deletion can only be done by a subset of editors assigned particular specialized privileges by the community, called administrators. An omission that has been carried out can be contested by appeal to the deleting administrator or on another discussion board called Deletion review (DRV).

Occasionally, deletion instances attract public attention, causing controversy or criticism of Wikipedia or other entities. Conventions and practices of deletion have caused a long-lasting controversy within the Wikipedia community, with two schools of thought forming, known as deletionism and inclusionism, with one generally favoring deletion as a conventional and relatively routine practice (deletionism) and the other proposing broader retention (inclusionism).

== Purpose ==
In the English version of the online encyclopedia Wikipedia, notability is a criterion to determine whether a topic merits a separate Wikipedia article. It is described in the guideline "Wikipedia:Notability". In general, notability is an attempt to assess whether the topic has "gained sufficiently significant attention by the world at large and over a period of time" as evidenced by significant coverage in reliable secondary sources that are independent of the topic". The notability guideline was introduced in 2006 and has since been subject to various controversies.

By community conventions, deletion is used to ensure that the subject of each Wikipedia article is worthy of comprehensive coverage, i.e., notable. Deletion is also used to remove from the encyclopedia content that violates intellectual property rights, particularly copyright, and content that is purely intended to advertise a product.

=== Deletionism and inclusionism ===
Deletionism and inclusionism are opposing philosophies that developed within the site's community. The terms reflect differing attitudes on what degree of coverage is considered appropriate for the encyclopedia, along with the corresponding tendencies either to delete or to include a given encyclopedia article.

Deletionists are proponents of selective coverage and removal of articles seen as poorly defended. Deletionist viewpoints are commonly motivated by a desire that Wikipedia be focused on and cover significant topics—along with the desire to place a firm cap upon proliferation of promotional use (seen as abuse of the website), trivia, and articles which are, in their opinion, of no general interest, lack suitable source material for high-quality coverage, are too short or otherwise unacceptably poor in quality, or may cause maintenance overload to the community.

Inclusionists are proponents of broad retention, including retention of "harmless" articles and articles otherwise deemed substandard to allow for future improvement. Inclusionist viewpoints are commonly motivated by a desire to keep Wikipedia broad in coverage with a much lower entry barrier for topics covered—along with the belief that it is impossible to tell what knowledge might be "useful" or productive, that content often starts poor and is improved if time is allowed, that there is effectively no incremental cost of coverage, that arbitrary lines in the sand are unhelpful and may prove divisive, and that goodwill requires avoiding arbitrary deletion of others' work. Some extend this to include allowing a wider range of sources such as notable blogs and other websites.

To the extent that an official stance existed as of 2010, it was that "There is no practical limit to the number of topics it can cover" but "there is an important distinction between what can be done, and what should be done", the latter being the subject of the policy "What Wikipedia is not". The policy concludes "Consequently, this policy is not a free pass for inclusion".

== Overview of processes ==
Unless an administrator deletes an article on sight, the deletion process involves the addition of a template to the report by an editor, indicating to readers and other editors which kind of deletion process is sought for that article. Removing a template proposing speedy deletion or proposed deletion often precipitates a formal nomination for deletion through AfD. In contrast, removing an AfD template is not permitted until the discussion has concluded. When an article is deleted, the article's talk page is generally also deleted, as are links that redirect to the deleted article. Deletion discussions are carried out on separate pages dedicated to that purpose and are not deleted. Wikipedia administrators can see content that has been deleted, but other editors and visitors to the site do not. (Note: An additional means of hiding specific content within Wikipedia articles is revision deletion, or RevDel, by which an administrator can perform sanitization/redaction of specific revisions of an article, thereby hiding certain information from the view of non-administrators.) Processes exist for editors to request access to deleted content to use for other purposes.

=== Speedy deletion ===
Administrators may delete specific articles on Wikipedia without community input. However, "according to Wikipedia policy, editors should only nominate an article for speedy deletion under limited circumstances, such as pure vandalism, and not mark legitimate pages without good faith discussion".

Wikipedia "maintains an extensive list" of criteria for speedy deletion, and the majority of deleted pages fall under one of these criteria for speedy deletion (spam, copyright violations, vandalism, test pages and so on) and can be deleted by any administrator as soon as they see them. In some cases, speedy deletion has been applied to the mass-deletion of articles created by identified sock puppet accounts of editors who were paid to develop reports in violation of Wikipedia's terms of use.

A non-administrator seeking the speedy deletion of an article typically adds a speedy deletion template to the top of the article, which in turn adds the article to a list checked by administrators for this purpose.

In August 2025, due to an influx of AI-generated Wikipedia articles, the speedy deletion process was updated to include articles consisting mainly of AI slop content.

=== Proposed deletion ===
Proposed deletion, or PROD, is an intermediate process developed for articles that do not meet the criteria for speedy deletion but for which a full discussion is likely unnecessary. As with speedy deletion, a template is added to the page indicating that deletion is sought. The article will be deleted if no editor contests or removes the tag within seven days.

Due to concerns regarding defamation and other personality rights, Wikipedia policies direct special attention to biographies of living persons, which may be deleted for lacking citations. Schneider et al. identify proposed deletions of such biographies (BLP-PROD) as a separate path to deletion.

=== Articles for deletion ===
==== Mechanism ====
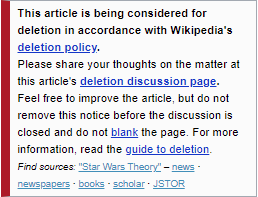
A typical AfD notice (Note: Appearance is variable: the notice will change shape based on the width of the screen on which it is viewed.)

For articles that do not meet the criteria for speedy deletion and for which proposed deletion is not attempted or a PROD tag is removed, editors can nominate the article for deletion through community discussion. Discussions typically last seven days, after which a deciding editor determines whether a consensus has been reached. Deletion discussions are carried out on separate pages in Wikipedia's project space dedicated to that purpose, and the discussions themselves are not deleted. Any editor may participate in the discussion, and certain Wikipedia editors are persistent participants in Articles for deletion (AfD) discussions. Discussions can be cut short under the "Snowball Clause", where an overwhelming consensus for a particular outcome quickly develops, and conversely can be extended several times, on rare occasions lasting a month or more. Wikipedia policy encourages editors to use deletion as a "last resort" following attempts to improve an article by conducting additional research. Separate discussion boards exist for the deletion of other kinds of content, including "Redirects for discussion" (RfD), "Categories for discussion" (CfD), "Files for discussion" (FfD), "Templates for discussion" (TfD), and "Miscellany for deletion" (MfD). The last one encompasses proposals to delete project-space pages, portals, and user-space pages.

Discussions are initiated with a proposal to delete, but they may resolve several possible outcomes. Other common possibilities are that the article is kept, whether by consensus to keep, or the absence of agreement for another outcome; that it is merged into another article; or that the title is redirected to another report, the latter of which may or may not entail deletion of the edit history of the deleted page. Wikipedia policy supports finding "alternatives to deletion" (ATD), which may include any alternatives.

==== Scope ====
Through the AfD process, almost 500,000 articles have been deleted between 2001 and 2021. In 2021, about 20,000 articles were nominated. About 60% of articles nominated for deletion are deleted, about 25% are kept, and the remainder are merged with another article, redirected to another article, or met with another fate. According to a study of AfD debates (and its arguments commonly called "votes") from 2005 through 2018, 5% of debates were not closed by an administrator and 3% received no votes after nomination. About 64% of debates ended in "Delete" and 24% in "Keep," with the remainder merged into other articles (4%), redirected, or other outcomes.

Veteran editors have disproportionate participation rates in AfD debates, compared to newcomers, and their role has increased over time. Although 161,266 editors contributed to AfD debates, less than one percent (1,218) generated half of all debate votes. Yet the most active participants are not more likely than other Wikipedia editors to prevail in AfD debates.

Although the default result of an AfD would be to retain the article, "the momentum in AfD is toward deletion": According to researchers, "early votes are highly predictive of outcomes". Notably, when the initial vote in an AfD discussion calls for deletion, it proves to be successful in 84.5% of the cases. Another key factor in AfD debates is the citation of relevant Wikipedia policies, with an early citation of specific Notability policies as most capable of shifting the discussion to Keep.

=== Deletion review and undeletion ===
The outcomes of deletion discussions can be appealed to another discussion board called Deletion review, which may result in "undeletion" of previously deleted content.

In some instances, an article is repeatedly recreated after being deleted, to the point where an administrator locks the page so that a piece can no longer be created at that title, which is referred to as "salting" in reference to the ancient tradition of salting the earth.

=== Out-of-process deletions ===
Very rarely, a Wikipedia article might be deleted for reasons unrelated to administrator action or community discussion, such as when the Wikimedia Foundation (WMF) deletes an article due to a legal concern such as a court order external to Wikipedia. Finally, a Wikipedia vandal can soft-delete a page by making an edit that blanks the page, although this will almost always be quickly detected and undone by other editors. For example, the content of Donald Trump's Wikipedia article was briefly deleted in 2015 before being promptly restored. In rare cases, however, an administrator may blank the page of a contentious discussion while preserving the edit history of the page.

== Deletions attracting public attention ==
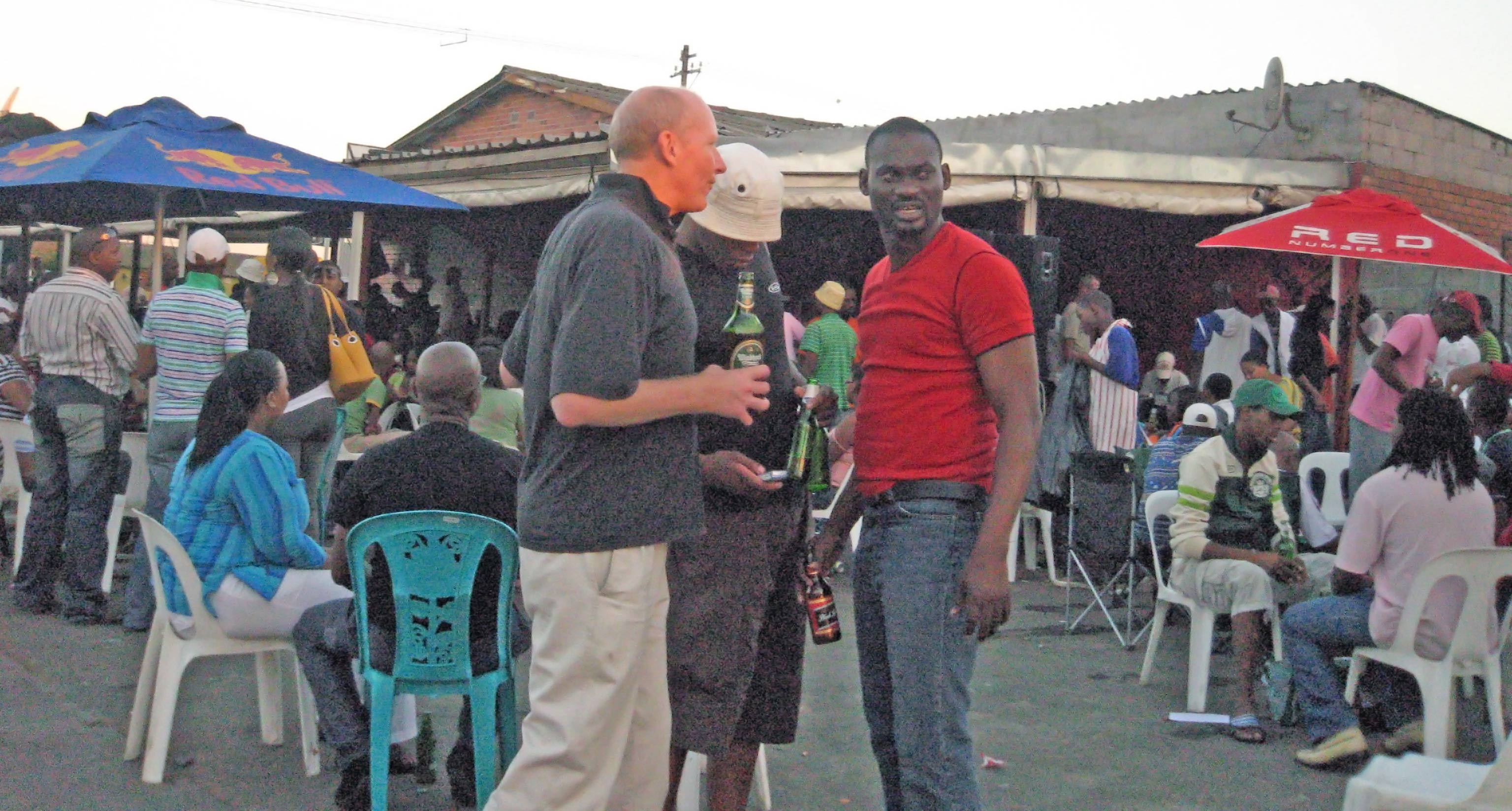
The notability of the South African restaurant Mzoli's was under scrutiny in Wikipedia as well as outside sources.

Specific cases of disputes between deletionists and inclusionists have attracted media coverage.

=== 2006–2007 ===
In July 2006, writers for The Inquirer complained about claims by Wikipedia editors that The Inquirer conspired with Everywhere Girl (a stock photo model whose identity was initially unknown and who appeared on advertising material around the world) to create her phenomenon. They observed an apparent campaign to remove all references to Everywhere Girl on Wikipedia. Later, they found it contrary to common sense that what became included on Wikipedia was their series of reports on the deletions of the Wikipedia article.

In December 2006, writer and composer Matthew Dallman found that Wikipedia's biography of him was under debate, and became drawn to the vote counts. He decided not to participate himself because of Wikipedia's apparent dislike of self-promotion, saying, "It's like I'm on trial, and I can't testify". However, he claimed he would not be able to resist the urge.

Andrew Klein was disappointed that the article on his webcomic Cake Pony was deleted, despite his claims that the "article contains valuable and factual information about a popular internet meme". He conceded that "it's their site, and you've got to play by their rules". Many other webcomic-related articles were deleted in the fall of 2006, resulting in criticism by the artists of those comics.

Slate and The Wall Street Journal writer Timothy Noah documented his "career as an encyclopedia entry", and questioned the need for rules on notability in addition to rules on verifiability.

In February 2007, the nomination of the Terry Shannon article for deletion was ridiculed by The Inquirer.

The deletion of the biography of television anchor Susan Peters, the article for the Pownce website, and Ruby programmer why the lucky stiff also sparked controversy.

As an early notable example, the 2007 deletion of South African restaurant Mzoli's was given substantial coverage in the media due to a dispute over an editor deleting what was almost the initial version only 22 minutes after being created by Jimmy Wales, one of Wikipedia's founders. Wales said that supporters of deletion displayed "shockingly bad faith behavior". The article was kept after a multitude of editors helped work on it. The consequence is that while inclusionists can say the deleting administrator crossed the line, deletionists can say that the process works as notability was established.

=== 2009 ===
On February 14, 2009, Nathaniel Stern and Scott Kildall created a Wikipedia article called "Wikipedia Art", which sought to "invite performative utterances in order to change" what content was acceptable to include in the article itself. In that was simultaneously a self-referential performance art piece called Wikipedia Art. Although the creators encouraged editors to strictly follow Wikipedia guidelines in editing the page, Wikipedia editors determined its intent was nonetheless in violation of site rules, and it was deleted within 15 hours of its initial posting. The resulting controversy received national coverage, including an article in The Wall Street Journal. The WMF later claimed Stern and Kildall had infringed on the Wikipedia trademark with their own website, wikipediaart.org. The artists publicly released a letter they received in March 2009 from a law firm requesting that they turn over their domain name to Wikipedia. Mike Godwin, then the foundation's legal council, later stated that they would not pursue any further legal action. Mary Louise Schumacher of The Milwaukee Journal Sentinel compared the incident to the "outrage inspired by Marcel Duchamp's urinal or Andy Warhol's Brillo Boxes." Yale research fellow Claire Gordon called the article an example of the "feedback loop" of "Wikipedia's totalizing claims to knowledge" in a 2011 Huffington Post report.

Comic book and science fiction/fantasy novel writer Peter David became involved in a November 2009 discussion on the deletion of actor Kristian Ayre's Wikipedia biography. David took issue with the quality of the discussion and what he perceived as deletionism on the part of some of the project's editors. He wrote about the experience in his "But I Digress ..." column in Comics Buyer's Guide #1663 (March 2010), remarking that "Wikipedia, which has raised the trivial to the level of the art form, actually has cut-off lines for what's deemed important enough to warrant inclusion". In attacking the practice in general, David focused on the process by which the merits of Ayre's biography were discussed before its deletion and what he described as inaccurate arguments that led to that result. Referring to the processes by which articles were judged suitable for inclusion as "nonsensical, inaccurate, and flawed", David provided information about Ayre with the expressed purpose that it would lead to the article's recreation. The article was recreated on January 20, 2010.

=== 2013 ===
In March 2013, the French interior intelligence agency DCRI made a request for deletion of the French-language Wikipedia article about the Pierre-sur-Haute military radio station, titled Station hertzienne militaire de Pierre sur Haute. The Wikimedia Foundation then asked the DCRI which parts of the article were causing a problem, noting that the article closely reflected information in a 2004 documentary made by Télévision Loire 7, a French local television station, a film not only freely available online but made with the cooperation of the French Air Force.

The DCRI then forced Rémi Mathis, a volunteer administrator of the French-language Wikipedia and president of Wikimedia France, under threat of detention and arrest, to delete the article. The article was promptly restored by another Wikipedia contributor living in Switzerland. As a result of the controversy, the article temporarily became the most-read page on the French Wikipedia, with more than 120,000 page views during the weekend of 6–7 April 2013. The high amount of extra attention was noted as an example of the Streisand effect in action. Mathis was named Wikipedian of the Year by Jimmy Wales at Wikimania 2013.

=== 2018 ===
In September 2018, British physicist Jessica Wade created an article on the English Wikipedia about Phelps, but this was deleted on February 11, 2019. On April 12, The Washington Post published an op-ed about, in part, the English-language Wikipedia's lack of coverage given to Phelps' contribution to the discovery of element 117. The column, co-written by Wade, decried discussions among volunteer editors at the site that resulted in deletion of the article on Phelps. According to an article in the July 2019 Chemistry World, "her name didn't appear in the articles announcing tennessine's discovery. She wasn't profiled by mainstream media. Most mentions of her work are on her employer's website – a source that's not classed as independent by Wikipedia standards and therefore not admissible when it comes to establishing notability. The [Wikipedia] community consensus was that her biography had to go." The deletion was contested multiple times. The article was restored in January 2020.

=== 2021 ===
In November 2021, the English Wikipedia's entry for Mass killings under communist regimes was nominated for deletion, with some editors arguing that it has "a biased 'anti-Communist' point of view", that "it should not resort to 'simplistic presuppositions that events are driven by any specific ideology'", and that "by combining different elements of research to create a 'synthesis', this constitutes original research and therefore breaches Wikipedia rules". This was criticized by Robert Tombs, who called it an attempt to "whitewash communism" and "morally indefensible, at least as bad as Holocaust denial, because 'linking ideology and killing' is the very core of why these things are important. I have read the Wikipedia page, and it seems careful and balanced. Therefore, attempts to remove it can only be ideologically motivated – to whitewash Communism". Other Wikipedia editors and users on social media opposed the deletion of the article. The article's deletion nomination received considerable attention from conservative media. The Heritage Foundation, an American conservative think tank, called the arguments made in favor of deletion "absurd and ahistorical". On December 1, 2021, a panel of four administrators found that the discussion yielded no consensus, meaning that the status quo was retained, and the article was not deleted. The article's deletion discussion was the largest in Wikipedia's history.

=== 2023 ===
In August 2023, editors debated whether Wikipedia should have an article on Donald Trump's mug shot. Proponents of keeping the article argued that it was a historical image, which was questioned by opponents. Other editors suggested merging the article to the article about the election racketeering prosecution in Georgia. The discussion concluded with the decision to keep the article.

=== 2024 ===
In October 2024, the WMF "suspended access" to the Asian News International vs. Wikimedia Foundation article. This was ordered by the Delhi High Court as part of a court case involving the foundation and the news agency Asian News International. Access to the article was restored in May 2025 following the court order being overturned by the Supreme Court of India.

== See also ==
- Deletionpedia – a now inactive project unrelated to Wikimedia that collected certain articles deleted from Wikipedia
