= Predictions of the end of Wikipedia =

"Will Wikipedia exist in 20 years?", a 2017 discussion between academic Yochai Benkler and Wikimedia Foundation executive director Katherine Maher

Various observers have predicted the end of Wikipedia since it rose to prominence, with pitfalls from lack of quality control, artificial intelligence (AI) or inconsistencies among contributors.

Alternative online encyclopedias have been proposed as replacements for Wikipedia, including WolframAlpha, as well as the both now-defunct Knol (from Google) and Owl (from AOL). A 2013 review raised alarms regarding Wikipedia's shortcomings on hoaxes, on vandalism, an imbalance of material, and quality control of articles. Earlier critiques lamented the vulgar content and absence of sufficient references in articles. Others suggest that the unwarranted deletion of useful articles from Wikipedia may portend its end, which itself inspired the creation of the now inactive Deletionpedia.

Contrary to such predictions, Wikipedia constantly grew in both size and influence, until Wikipedia saw a decline in pageviews from 2024 to 2025.

Recent developments with artificial intelligence in Wikimedia projects have prompted new predictions that AI applications, which consume free and open content, will replace Wikipedia.

== Personnel ==
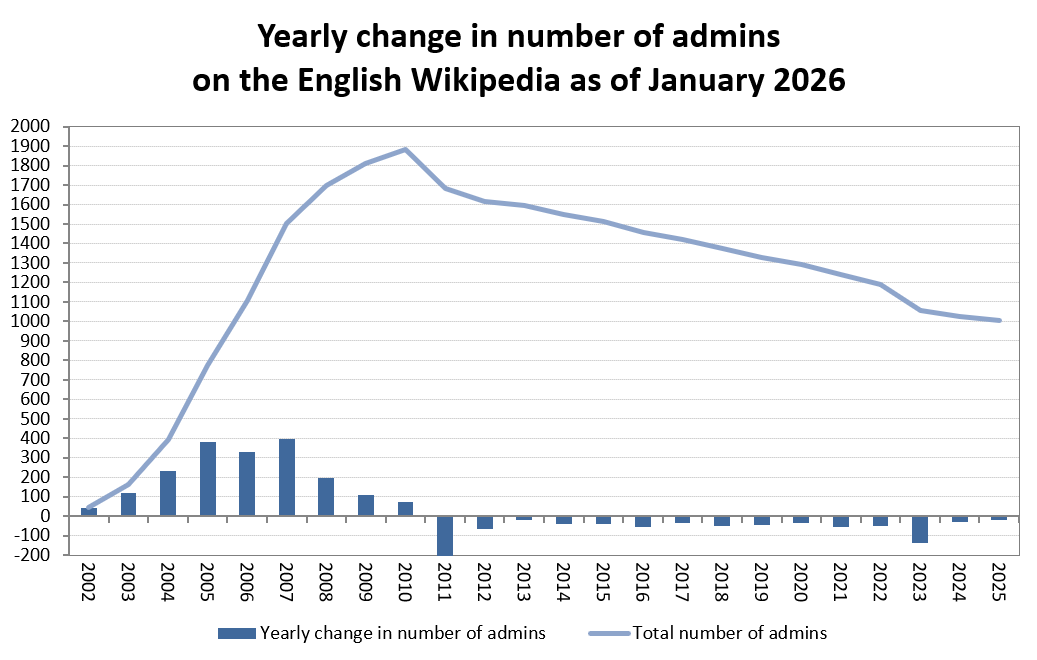
Admin numbers by year on the English Wikipedia, 2002 to 2025

Wikipedia is crowdsourced by a few million volunteer editors. Of the millions of registered editors, only tens of thousands contribute the majority of its contents, and a few thousand do quality control and maintenance work. As the encyclopedia expanded in the 2010s, the number of active editors did not grow proportionately. Various sources predicted that Wikipedia will eventually have too few editors to be functional and collapse from lack of participation.

The English Wikipedia has 816 volunteer administrators who perform various functions, including functions similar to those carried out by a forum moderator. Critics have described their actions as harsh, bureaucratic, biased, unfair, or capricious and predicted that the resulting outrage would lead to the site's closure.

Various 2012 articles reported that a decline in English Wikipedia's recruitment of new administrators could end Wikipedia.

=== Decline in editors (2007–2014) ===
Tabular data
English Wikipedia editors with >100 edits per month

A 2014 trend analysis published in The Economist stated that "The number of editors for the English-language version has fallen by a third in seven years." The attrition rate for active editors in English Wikipedia was described by The Economist as substantially higher than in other (non-English) Wikipedias. It reported that in other languages, the number of "active editors" (those with at least five edits per month) has been relatively constant since 2008: some 42,000 editors, with narrow seasonal variances of about 2,000 editors up or down.

In the English Wikipedia, the number of active editors peaked in 2007 at about 50,000 editors, and fell to 30,000 editors in 2014.

Given that the trend analysis published in The Economist presented the number of active editors for non-English Wikipedias as remaining relatively constant, sustaining their numbers at approximately 42,000 active editors, the contrast pointed to the effectiveness of Wikipedia in those languages to retain their active editors on a renewable and sustained basis. Though different language versions of Wikipedia have different policies, no comment identified a particular policy difference as potentially making a difference in the rate of editor attrition for English Wikipedia. Editor count showed a slight uptick a year later, and no clear trend after that.

In a 2013 article, Tom Simonite of MIT Technology Review said that for several years running, the number of Wikipedia editors had been falling, and cited the bureaucratic structure and rules as a factor. Simonite alleged that some Wikipedians use the labyrinthine rules and guidelines to dominate others and have a vested interest in keeping the status quo. A January 2016 article in Time by Chris Wilson said Wikipedia might lose many editors because a collaboration of occasional editors and smart software will take the lead.

Andrew Lih and Andrew Brown both maintain editing Wikipedia with smartphones is difficult and discourages new potential contributors. Lih alleges there is serious disagreement among existing contributors on how to resolve this. In 2015, Lih feared for Wikipedia's long-term future while Brown feared problems with Wikipedia would remain and rival encyclopedias would not replace it.

== Viewers and fundraisers ==
The growth rate in human page views, early 2024 to middle 2026

As of 2015, with more viewing by smartphones, there had been a marked decline in persons who viewed Wikipedia from their computers, and according to The Washington Post "[people are] far less likely to donate". At the time, the Wikimedia Foundation reported reserves equivalent to one year's budgeted expenditures. On the other hand, the number of paid staff had ballooned, so those expenses increased.

In 2021, Andreas Kolbe, a former co-editor-in-chief of The Signpost, wrote that the Wikimedia Foundation was reaching its 10-year goal of a US$100 million endowment, five years earlier than planned, which may surprise donors and users around the world who regularly see Wikipedia fundraising banners. He also said accounting methods disguise the size of operating surpluses, top managers earn $300,000–400,000 a year, and over 40 people work exclusively on fundraising.

== Artificial intelligence ==
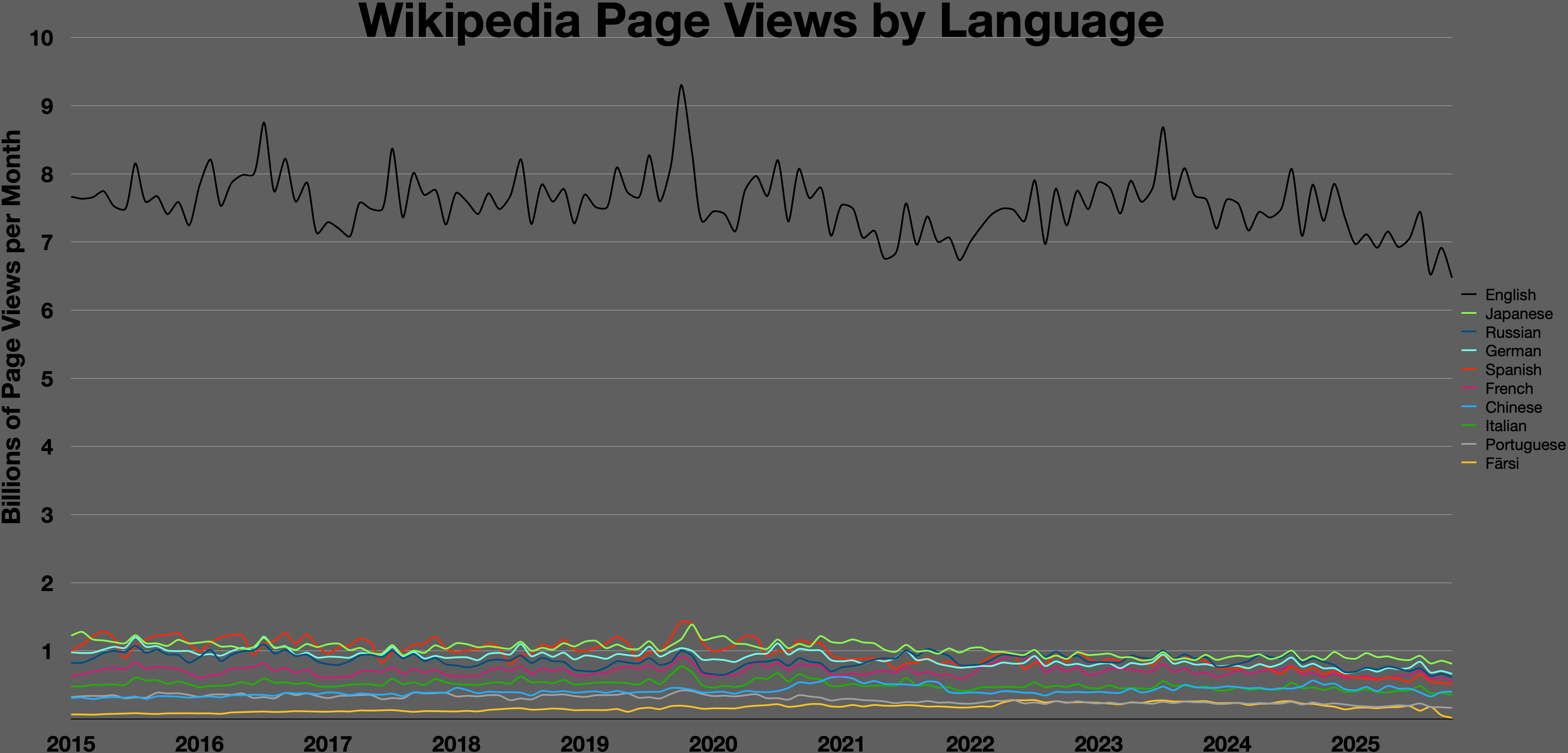
Wikipedia page views by language, 2015 to 2025

Wikimedia human page views by era, Jan 2020 - Nov 2026

Wikipedia faces a decline in human visitors, raising concerns about its long-term sustainability and community participation. The Wikimedia Foundation (WMF), when reporting this decline, attributed this in part to the lack of clicks from users of large language models and search engines that are using content from Wikipedia.

Data published in August 2025 showed that after the launch of ChatGPT and the rise of other AI-powered search summaries, some types of articles on Wikipedia—especially those that closely resemble the kind of content ChatGPT produces—experienced a noticeable drop in readership. Overall human pageviews reportedly fell by about 8% between 2024 and 2025, suggesting that AI-overviews and chatbots are increasingly being used in place of direct visits to Wikipedia.

According to industry web analytics data, ChatGPT's estimated monthly web traffic surpassed that of Wikipedia since May 2025, as visits to ChatGPT continued to grow, while Wikipedia’s total site traffic declined.

== Timeline of predictions ==
On the eve of the 20th anniversary of Wikipedia, associate professor of the Department of Communication Studies at Northeastern University Joseph Reagle conducted a retrospective study of numerous "predictions of the ends of Wikipedia" over two decades, divided into chronological waves: "Early growth (2001–2002)", "Nascent identity (2001–2005)", "Production model (2005–2010)", "Contributor attrition (2009–2017)" and the current period "(2020–)". Each wave brought its distinctive fatal predictions, which never came true. As a result, Reagle concluded Wikipedia was not in danger.

Concern grew in 2023 that the ubiquity and proliferation of artificial intelligence (AI) may adversely affect Wikipedia. Rapid improvements and widespread application of AI may render Wikipedia obsolete or reduce its importance. A 2023 study found that AI, when applied to Wikipedia, works most efficiently for error-correction in tandem with humans.

== See also ==
- Good Faith Collaboration: The Culture of Wikipedia
- History of Wikipedia
- Wikipedia Zero
- Criticism of Wikipedia
- Bias in Wikipedia
