= Predictions of the end of Google =

Predictions of Google's demise

Various publications and commentators have offered a range of predictions of the end of Google, a search engine established in 1998.

== History ==
In 2007, a writer for Wired shared a rumor that Wikipedia's co-founder Jimmy Wales had a secret project to end Google. A 2008 article on potential ends of Google noted at that time that Google had 61 percent of traffic while its major competitors Yahoo and Microsoft could catch up. At the 2008 launch of Cuil, various writers described how this search engine would end Google. In 2008, media commentator Jeff Jarvis said that he saw no competitor for Google except a trend of openness. In 2009, a writer for The Daily Beast speculated that Wolfram Alpha would out compete Google as a search engine.

Writers for Forbes have speculated on various situations which could end Google. In 2011, a writer described how Siri would end Google. In 2012, a writer described that nationalization of digital products could end Google. Another writer in 2012 argued that Google opposed the Stop Online Piracy Act by participating in protests against SOPA and PIPA because the company felt an existential threat to its business model in that law's view of digital property rights.

=== Government Involvement ===
The United States Government has been trying to break up Google via various antitrust lawsuits directed at its monopolies on online search, online advertising, and edtech. In August 2025, a judge ruled that Google had violated antitrust laws to maintain its dominance in online search, and the government's potential solution involves breaking Google apart. Judge Amit P. Mehta, seeks to separate the company's popular web browser, Chrome, as reported by The New York Times. Chrome is a bigger target, as it more directly directs users to Google search, making it more challenging for other search engines to establish a foothold.

Regardless of the outcome, the trial reflects growing pressure to rethink how information flows online — and as AI reshapes search, it could mark the end of Google’s dominance

- IDC analyst Matt Eastwood

=== Google's "self-destruction ===
In November 2025, Google announced that it would restrict search for schools that reject its AI services. This has been reported to end both Google's monopoly on EdTech and monopoly on search.

== See also ==
- Predictions of the end of Wikipedia
