= Deletionism and inclusionism on Wikipedia =

Opposing Wikipedia community philosophies

Deletionism and inclusionism are opposing philosophies that developed within the community of volunteer editors of the online encyclopedia Wikipedia. The terms reflect differing attitudes on what degree of coverage is considered appropriate for the encyclopedia, along with the corresponding tendencies either to delete or to include a given encyclopedia article.

Deletionists are proponents of selective coverage and removal of articles seen as poorly defended. Deletionist viewpoints are commonly motivated by a desire that Wikipedia be focused on and cover significant topics—along with the desire to place a firm cap upon proliferation of promotional use (seen as abuse of the website), trivia, and articles which are, in their opinion, of no general interest, lack suitable source material for high-quality coverage, are too short or otherwise unacceptably poor in quality, or may cause maintenance overload to the community.

Inclusionists are proponents of broad retention, including retention of "harmless" articles and articles otherwise deemed substandard to allow for future improvement. Inclusionist viewpoints are commonly motivated by a desire to keep Wikipedia broad in coverage with a much lower entry barrier for topics covered—along with the belief that it is impossible to tell what knowledge might be "useful" or productive, that content often starts poor and is improved if time is allowed, that there is effectively no incremental cost of coverage, that arbitrary lines in the sand are unhelpful and may prove divisive, and that goodwill requires avoiding arbitrary deletion of others' work. Some extend this to include allowing a wider range of sources such as notable blogs and other websites.

To the extent that an official stance existed as of 2010, it was that "There is no practical limit to the number of topics it can cover" but "there is an important distinction between what can be done, and what should be done", the latter being the subject of the policy "What Wikipedia is not". The policy concludes "Consequently, this policy is not a free pass for inclusion".

== Background ==
Because of concerns about vandalism and appropriateness of content, most wikis require policies regarding inclusion. Wikipedia has developed spaces for policy and conflict resolution regarding the disputes for individual articles. These debates, which can be initiated by anyone, take place on an "Articles for deletion" page (often referred to by editors as AfD). Much discussion concerns not only the content of each article in question, but also "differing perspectives on how to edit an ideal encyclopedia."

At the end of each debate, an administrator judges the quality of the community consensus. Articles that do not require debate can be flagged and deleted without debate by administrators. If the administrator's decision is disputed, then the discussion can be taken to "deletion review", where the community discusses the administrator's decision. In controversial cases, the debates can spread to other places on the Internet.

A 2006 estimate was that pages about Wikipedia governance and policy entries were one of the fastest-growing areas of Wikipedia and contained about one-quarter of its content.

=== Positions ===
Inclusionists may argue that the interest of a few is a sufficient condition for the existence of an article, since such articles are harmless and there is no restriction on space in Wikipedia. Favoring the idiosyncratic and subjective, an inclusionist slogan is "Wikipedia is not paper."

On the other hand, deletionists favor objectivity and conformity, holding that "Wikipedia is not Google", a "junkyard", or "a dumping ground for facts". They argue that the interest of enough people is a necessary condition for article quality, and articles about trivial subjects damage the credibility and future success of Wikipedia. They advocate the establishment and enforcement of specific standards and policies as a form of jurisprudence.

According to veteran contributor Geoff Burling, newer members are less likely to have helped delete articles that should have been kept in hindsight, and therefore have learned less about exercising caution in the deletion process. Journalism professor K. G. Schneider has identified the mentality of deletionism as having manifested once the emphasis of the encyclopedia shifted from quantity to quality.

In early 2007, Wikipedia co-founder Larry Sanger identified himself as an inclusionist, except on certain topics pertaining to sexuality, for his Citizendium project. Former Wikimedia Foundation executive director Katherine Maher also identifies as inclusionist. Andrew Lih, a deletionist-turned-inclusionist, observes a cultural shift from Wikipedia's initial expansion in that it has become more cautious. He changed his position when an article he created about the social networking website Pownce was speedily deleted by another administrator as advertising.

=== Responses ===
Deletionpedia logo

A "Wikimorgue", in which all deleted articles and their edit histories would be retained, has been suggested as a means to provide greater transparency in the deletion process.

In an effort to promote a middle ground between the two philosophies, the "Association of Mergist Wikipedians" was created in November 2004, emphasizing the possibility of merging articles together as an alternative to both outright deletion of content and the retention of separate articles for less important subjects. A merge from one article to another is executed by moving the relevant content from the former to the latter, and redirecting the former to the latter.

== Criticism ==
Documentarian Jason Scott has noted the large amount of wasted effort that goes into deletion debates. Deletion debates may contribute to community disintegration, restriction of information, or a decrease in the rate of article creation that suggests a decrease in passion and motivation amongst editors. Being explicitly called an inclusionist or deletionist can sidetrack the issue from the actual debate. Nevertheless, some have observed that the interaction between the two groups may actually result in an enhancement of overall quality of content.

Startup accelerator and angel investor Y Combinator co-founder Paul Graham, on a page of "Startup Ideas We'd Like to Fund", lists "More open alternatives to Wikipedia", in which he laments:

Deletionists rule Wikipedia. Ironically, they're constrained by print-era thinking. What harm does it do if an online reference has a long tail of articles that are only interesting to a few people, so long as everyone can still find whatever they're looking for? There is room to do to Wikipedia what Wikipedia did to Britannica.

Novelist Nicholson Baker recounted how an article on the beat poet Richard Denner was deleted as "non-notable", (Note: The article has since been restored.) and criticised the behaviour of vigilante editors on Wikipedia in The New York Review of Books:

There are some people on Wikipedia now who are just bullies, who take pleasure in wrecking and mocking people's work – even to the point of laughing at non-standard "Engrish." They poke articles full of warnings and citation-needed notes and deletion prods till the topics go away.

Such debates have sparked the creation of websites critical of Wikipedia such as Wikitruth, which watches for articles in risk of deletion. Wikinews editor Brian McNeil has been quoted as saying that every encyclopedia experiences internal battles, the difference being that those of Wikipedia are public.

== Scholarly research ==
At the 2005 Digital Arts and Culture Conference, the two groups were discussed as examples among "Eventualism" and "Immediatism" in a successful large-scale architecture of participation. The existence of these groups was mentioned in a study by the Harvard Business School which reviewed the deletion debate over an article on Enterprise 2.0.

The Institut national de recherche pédagogique (National Institute for Educational Research) in France, in case studies of Wikipedia, reported that while it was difficult to measure the influence of the groups as of April 2006, their existence is indicative of Wikipedia's internal dynamics consisting of multiple identities, and may play progressively increasing roles.

In the Journal of the Association for Information Science and Technology, a study of Wikipedia's social dynamics called inclusionism and deletionism the two most prominent associations within Wikipedia. They observe that users in the same role (administrator, etc.) may hold different perspectives, and that "the diversity of member [information quality] preferences and the low cost of forming or switching associations may encourage schism in an existing association or evolution of new groups." At the same time, the associations may help to better critique existing policies and to find and achieve points of convergence.

Futurist Vasilis Kostakis argued that the existence of the deletionism and inclusionist conflict illustrates the imperfect governance model of Wikipedia, and ambiguity of its rules that can only be resolved through conflict.

== On German Wikipedia ==
Since the communities of different language versions of Wikipedia set their own notability standards, they have in some cases diverged substantially. Writing for Die Zeit, Kai Biermann describes the German Wikipedia as being dominated by "exclusionists", whereas he calls the English Wikipedia "inclusionist"; although c't author Torsten Kleinz commented that the English Wikipedia has for several years required users to have registered accounts to create articles, which German Wikipedia does not. A debate in late 2009 over inclusion of several articles led to criticism in the German blogosphere of such vehemence and volume that the German Wikimedia held a meeting with several bloggers and German Wikipedia administrators regarding the German Wikipedia's notability criteria, and issued a press statement.

== See also ==
- Criticism of Wikipedia § Notability of article topics
- Deletion of articles on Wikipedia
- Digital preservation
- Lumpers and splitters
- Systemic bias in Wikipedia
