= David Auerbach =

American writer

- Education: Yale University
- Occupations: Writer; technologist; software engineer
- Writing career
- Genre: Non-fiction

David Auerbach is an American writer and former Microsoft and Google software engineer. He has written on a variety of subjects, including social issues and popular culture, the environment, computer games, philosophy and literature. His 2018 book Bitwise: A Life in Code was well received, and chosen by Popular Mechanics as one of its 30 "Best Sci/Tech Books of 2018".

== Career ==
A graduate of Yale University, Auerbach worked on Microsoft's Messenger Service after college in the late 1990s – he is credited in The New York Times as having introduced smiley face emoticons to America during this time – before moving on to Google, where he stayed until 2008. He was a columnist for Slate magazine from 2013 to 2016, and has also been a contributor to Reuters, The American Reader, MIT Technology Review, The Nation, The Daily Beast, n+1 and Tablet.

In an article for Slate, Auerbach expressed criticism of facilitated communication, referring to it as a pseudoscience. Auerbach has also written on what he calls "A-culture", associated with anonymous online forums like Encyclopedia Dramatica and 4chan.

In 2017, BuzzFeed published screenshots of correspondence between Auerbach and Breitbart News editor Milo Yiannopoulos in which Auerbach appeared to provide Yiannopoulos with tips on topics such as Wikipedia controversies and the relationship status of Anita Sarkeesian, a Gamergate target at the time. Auerbach disputed the BuzzFeed article's statements about him. Speaking to The New Republic writer Jo Livingstone in 2018, he said he had checked the screenshots against his own account and found they didn't match; he called Yiannopoulos a "harmful troll", but said he had been in contact with him on "a Wikipedia-related scandal".

=== Bitwise: A Life in Code ===
In 2018, Auerbach published Bitwise: A Life in Code, a book described by The New York Times as a "thoughtful meditation on technology and its place in society". The book – part memoir, part historical review of the relationship between computer programming and the human being – contains anecdotes on such topics as the early rivalry between MSN Messenger Service (which Auerbach worked on) and AOL Instant Messenger, and garnered positive reviews. The Times Literary Supplement said that Auerbach discusses the consequences of Facebook's codifications of gender and race – which in part serve as tools for the targeting of advertisements – "with a degree of level-headedness that is seldom seen, especially when these issues are discussed online." The New Republic noted an at times "unfeeling tone", but concluded Bitwise was a "valuable resource for readers seeking to understand themselves in this new universe of algorithms, as data points and as human beings."

Kirkus Reviews described Auerbach as "the rare engineer who is also conversant with literature and philosophy, both of which he brings to bear on interpreting his experiences as a builder of these thinking machines and the heuristics and languages that guide them", and called the book an "eye-opening look at computer technology and its discontents and limitations". Publishers Weekly said Auerbach is a "natural teacher, translating complex computing concepts into understandable layman's terms", characterizing Bitwise as an "enjoyable look inside the point where computers and human life join".

=== Meganets: How Digital Forces Beyond Our Control Commandeer Our Daily Lives and Inner Realities ===
Auerbach published his second book in March 2023 titled Meganets: How Digital Forces Beyond Our Control Commandeer Our Daily Lives and Inner Realities. Andrew Anthony from The Guardian interviewed Auerbach and explored several key themes.

Auerbach defines a meganet as a "persistent, evolving and opaque data network that heavily influences how people see the world", that necessarily involves constant interaction between services provided by big tech and the millions of users that use and influence those services. Auerbach opines that meganets are contributing to a "severe fracturing of society" as users split into "like‑minded self‑policing groups that enforce unanimity and uniformity, and prevent any larger‑scale societal consensus", a process also inherently self‑reinforcing.

Auerbach suggests that one solution to the current problems that meganets generate is to intentionally impair the algorithms that "track people demographically and pair like with like" so that local homogeneity and the accompanying doctrinaire attitudes are hindered. Anthony described this strategy as "fight[ing] chaos with chaos" during his questioning.

== Recognition ==
- In 2014, three columns written by Auerbach garnered Slate a nomination for the 2014 National Magazine Awards in the "Columns and Commentary" category.
- Auerbach was a 2016 New America National Fellow.
- Popular Mechanics included Bitwise: A Life in Code in its 30 "Best Sci/Tech Books of 2018".

== Works ==
=== Online ===
- David Auerbach, Slate
- David Auerbach, The American Reader
- David Auerbach, n+1
- David Auerbach, MIT Technology Review
- David Auerbach, The Daily Beast
- David Auerbach, Tablet
- David Auerbach, UnHerd

=== Books ===
- Bitwise: A Life in Code. New York: Pantheon Books, 2018. ISBN 9781101871294, OCLC 994517802
- Meganets: How Digital Forces Beyond Our Control Commandeer Our Daily Lives and Inner Realities. PublicAffairs, 2023.
