= Notability on the English Wikipedia =

In the English version of the online encyclopedia Wikipedia, notability is a criterion to determine whether a topic merits a separate Wikipedia article. It is described in the guideline "Wikipedia:Notability". In general, notability is an attempt to assess whether the topic has "gained sufficiently significant attention by the world at large and over a period of time" as evidenced by significant coverage in reliable secondary sources that are independent of the topic". The notability guideline was introduced in 2006 and has since been subject to various controversies.

== History ==
The language of the criterion was modified and adapted to produce notability guidance in specific subject areas, before being introduced into the proposed notability guideline in September 2006. In response to growing concerns in 2006 about issues specifically affecting biographies of living persons, Wikipedia co-founder Jimmy Wales introduced a notability criterion via the core policy of "What Wikipedia Is Not". Wales commented that "I added Wikipedia is not a newspaper and especially not a tabloid newspaper and that we… attempt to make some sort of judgment about the long term historical notability of something…" Wales was unsure if the policy changes would be accepted, but within weeks the policy had been "refined, copyedited, and extended to include heuristics for determining long-term notability."

== Criteria ==
Notability is demonstrated using reliable sources according to the corresponding Wikipedia guideline. Reliable sources generally include mainstream news media and major academic journals, and exclude self-published sources, particularly when self-published on the internet. The foundation of this theory is that credible sources "exercise some form of editorial control."

Content not based upon reliable sources may be deemed original research, which is prohibited on Wikipedia. "A correlate to this notability criterion, crucial to the identity of the site, is the prohibition on original research, including the synthesis of previously published material."

As the Wikipedia community has grown, its rules have in turn become more complex, a trend known as instruction creep. This trend is reflected in the development and increasing complexity of the notability guidelines, with various special notability guidelines being proposed for specific topic areas, including criteria for pornographic actors and actresses.

Commentators have stressed the novelty of the notability criterion, which makes Wikipedia the first encyclopedia to openly discuss criteria for inclusion: "For the first time in history, a broad open discussion about 'encyclopedia notability' has been started that has already given rise to intensive debates and detailed – while still unfinished and unofficial – lists of possible criteria."

== Controversies ==
Two polarized perspectives on notability are commonly known as "inclusionism" and "deletionism".

In one instance, a group of editors agreed that many articles on webcomics should be deleted on the grounds that the various topics lacked notability. Some of the comic artists concerned reacted negatively, accusing editors of being "wannabe tin-pot dictators masquerading as humble editors". Nicholson Baker noted that by 2007, notability disputes had spread into other topics, including companies, places, websites, and people.

Timothy Noah wrote several articles in 2007 about the threatened deletion of his entry on grounds of his insufficient notability. He concluded that "Wikipedia's notability policy resembles U.S. immigration policy before 9/11: stringent rules, spotty enforcement." David Segal observed that "Wiki-worthiness has quietly become a new digital divide, separating those who think they are notable from those granted the imprimatur of notability by a horde of anonymous geeks."

A criticism by Hans Geser is that "Wikipedia sees itself as a publication that relies on reputation that has already been produced ex ante: especially when it is based on consensual mass media judgment or—in the case of lesser known individuals—on different smaller, but mutually independent sources. Of course, this policy does not acknowledge that a Wikipedia entry may itself become a factor in reputation building: especially when the information that this entry exists is propagated by journalists and other potent 'multiplicators'". Geser also refers, in more general terms, to the same effect described by Segal, that "a Wikipedia article may soon be considered as an indicator of relevance, eminence, popularity and reputation - for persons as well as for music bands, art works, localities, historical events and any kind of voluntary association".

== See also ==
- Criticism of Wikipedia § Notability of article topics
