= Vandalism on Wikipedia =

Malicious editing of Wikipedia

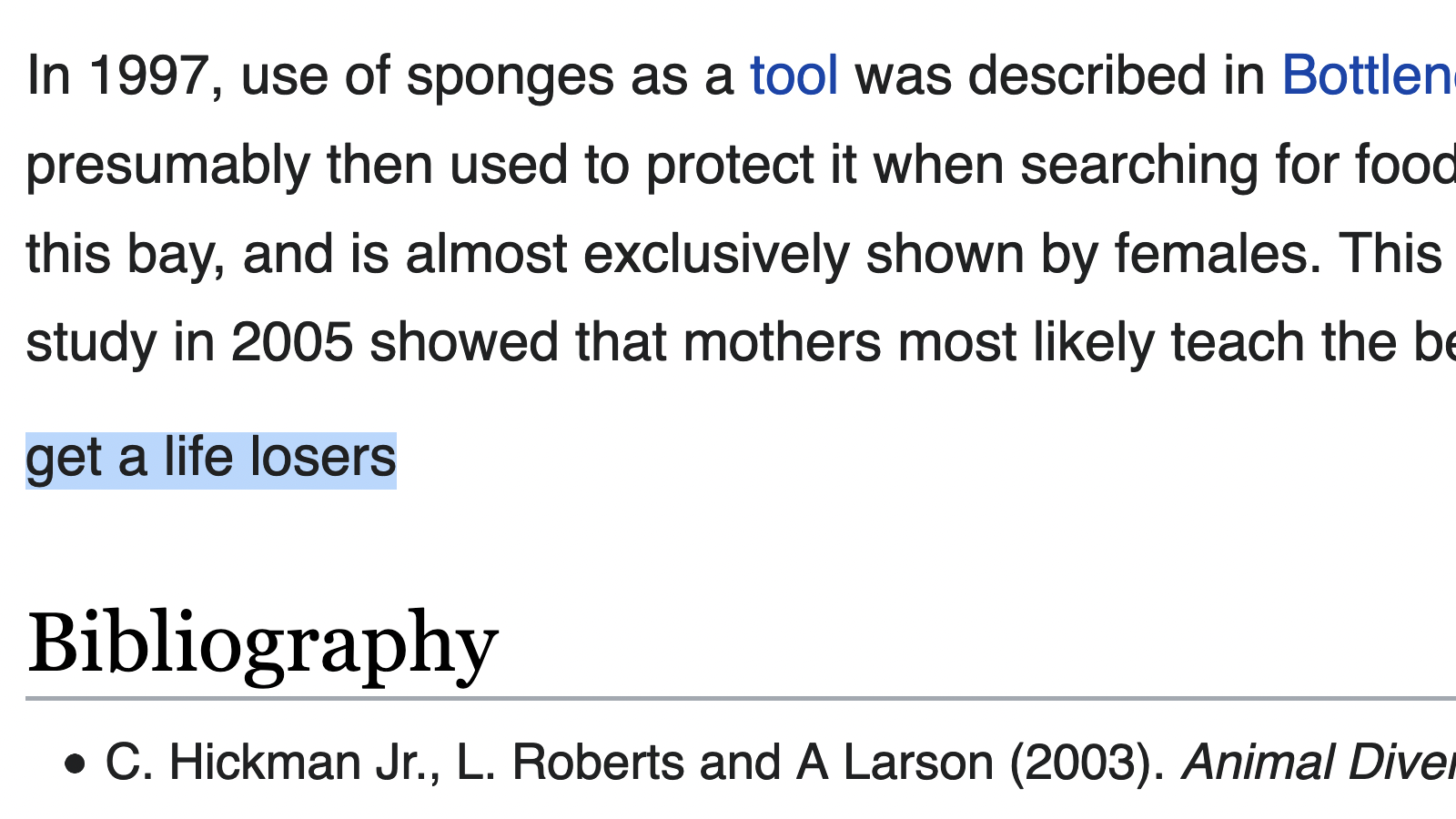
Reported vandalism of a Wikipedia article (Sponge). A section of page content was replaced by "get a life losers".

On Wikipedia, vandalism is editing a page in an intentionally disruptive or malicious manner. Vandalism includes any addition, removal, or modification that is intentionally humorous, nonsensical, a hoax, offensive, libelous or degrading in any way.

Throughout its history, Wikipedia has struggled to maintain a balance between allowing the freedom of open editing and protecting the accuracy of its information when false information can be potentially damaging to its subjects. Vandalism is easy to commit on Wikipedia, as anyone can edit the site, with the exception of protected pages (which, depending on the level of protection, can only be edited by users with certain privileges). Certain Wikipedia bots are capable of detecting and removing vandalism faster than any human editor could.

Vandalizing Wikipedia or otherwise causing disruption is against the site's terms of use. (Note: Subsection 3.3) Vandals are often blocked from editing, and may also be further banned according to the terms of use. Vandals could be blocked either for just a few hours/days/months or indefinitely depending on the level of vandalism they have committed. Vandalism can be committed by either guest editors from temporary accounts, or those with registered accounts (oftentimes accounts created solely to vandalize).

To combat inappropriate edits to articles which are frequently targeted by vandals, Wikipedia instates a protection policy, serving as a user-privilege merit system. For example, a semi-protected or fully protected page can be edited only by accounts that meet certain account age and activity thresholds or administrators respectively. Frequent targets of vandalism include articles on trending and controversial topics, celebrities, and current events. In some cases, people have been falsely reported as having died. This has notably happened to American rapper Kanye West and OpenAI CEO Sam Altman.

== Counter-vandalism measures ==
Screenshot of "administrator intervention against vandalism" page on the English Wikipedia in June 2022

There are various measures taken by Wikipedia to prevent or reduce the amount of vandalism. These include:

- Using Wikipedia's history functionality, which retains all prior versions of an article, restoring the article to the last version before the vandalism occurred; this is called reverting vandalism. The majority of vandalism on Wikipedia is reverted quickly. There are various ways in which the vandalism gets detected so it can be reverted:
  - Bots: In some cases, the vandalism is automatically detected and reverted by a Wikipedia bot. The vandal is always warned with no human intervention.
  - Recent changes patrol: Wikipedia has a special page that lists all the most recent changes. Some editors will monitor these changes for possible vandalism.
  - Watchlists: Any registered user can watch a page that they have created or edited or that they otherwise have an interest in. This functionality also enables users to monitor a page for vandalism.
  - Incidental discovery: Any reader who comes across vandalism by chance can revert it. In 2008, it was reported that the rarity of such incidental discovery indicated the efficacy of the other methods of vandalism removal.
- Protecting articles so only established users, or in some cases, only administrators can edit them. Semi-protected articles are those that can be edited only by those with an account that is autoconfirmed (at least four days old with at least ten edits). Extended confirmed protected articles are those that can be edited only by those with an account that is extended confirmed (at least thirty days old with at least 500 edits). Fully protected articles are those that can be edited only by administrators. Protection is generally instituted after one or more editors make a request on a special page for that purpose. An administrator familiar with the protection guidelines chooses whether or not to fulfill this request based on the guidelines.
- Blocking and banning those who have repeatedly committed acts of vandalism from editing for a period of time or in some cases, indefinitely. Vandals are not blocked as an act of punishment – the purpose of the block is simply to prevent further damage.
- Using the "abuse filter", also known as the "edit filter", which uses regular expressions to detect common vandalism terms. (Note: See Wikipedia:Edit filter)

Editors are generally warned before being blocked. The English Wikipedia and some other Wikipedias employ a four-stage warning process leading up to a block. This includes:

1. The first warning "assumes good faith" and takes a relaxed approach to the user. (in some cases, this level can be skipped if the editor assumes the user is acting in bad faith (Note: See Wikipedia:WikiProject User warnings/Usage and layout § Levels)).
2. The second warning does not assume any faith and is an actual warning (in some cases, this level may also be skipped).
3. The third warning assumes bad faith and is the first to warn the user that continued vandalism may result in a block.
4. The fourth warning is a final warning, stating that any future acts of vandalism will result in a block.

In 2005, the English Wikipedia started to require those who create new articles to have a registered account in an effort to fight vandalism. This occurred after inaccurate information was added to Wikipedia, in which a journalist was accused of taking part in John F. Kennedy's assassination. (Note: This is now known as the Seigenthaler incident.)

Wikipedia has experimented with systems in which edits to some articles, especially those of living people, are delayed until it can be reviewed and determined that they are not vandalism, and in some cases, that a source to verify accuracy is provided. This is in an effort to prevent inaccurate and potentially damaging information about living people from appearing on the site.

=== ClueBot NG ===
The most well-known bot that fights vandalism is ClueBot NG. The bot was created by Wikipedia users Christopher Breneman and Naomi Amethyst in 2010 (succeeding the original ClueBot created in 2007; NG stands for Next Generation) and uses machine learning and Bayesian statistics to determine if an edit is vandalism. A 2013 study estimated that without ClueBot, vandalism would remain live in articles for twice as long on average before being reverted.

== Notable acts of vandalism ==
=== Seigenthaler incident ===
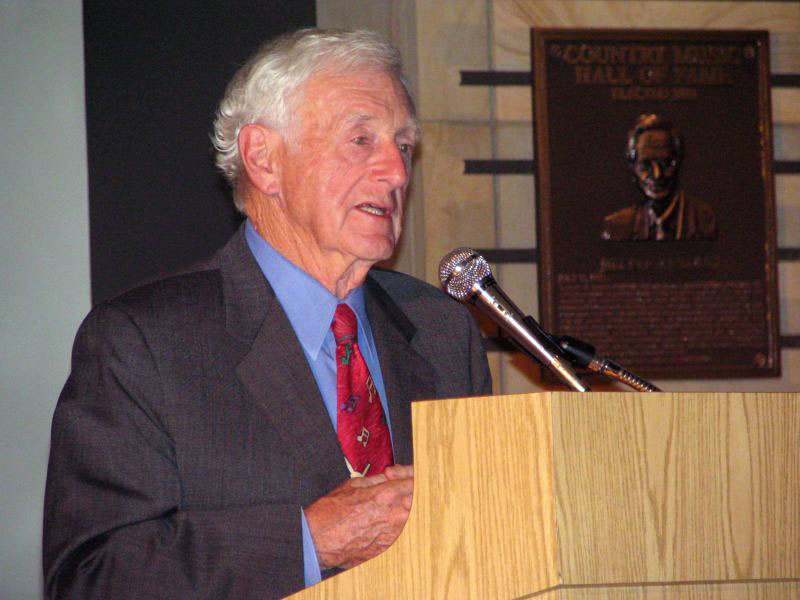
John Seigenthaler, who in 2005 criticized Wikipedia

In May 2005, a user edited the biographical article about John Seigenthaler such that it contained several false and defamatory statements. The inaccurate claims went unnoticed between May and September 2005, after which they were discovered by Victor S. Johnson Jr., a friend of Seigenthaler. Wikipedia content is often mirrored at sites such as Answers.com, which means that incorrect information can be replicated alongside correct information through a number of websites. Such information can develop a misleading air of authority because of its presence at such sites:

Then [Seigenthaler's] son discovered that his father's hoax biography also appeared on two other sites, Reference.com and Answers.com, which took direct feeds from Wikipedia. It was out there for four months before Seigenthaler realized and got the Wikipedia entry replaced with a more reliable account. The lies remained for another three weeks on the mirror sites downstream.

=== Stephen Colbert ===
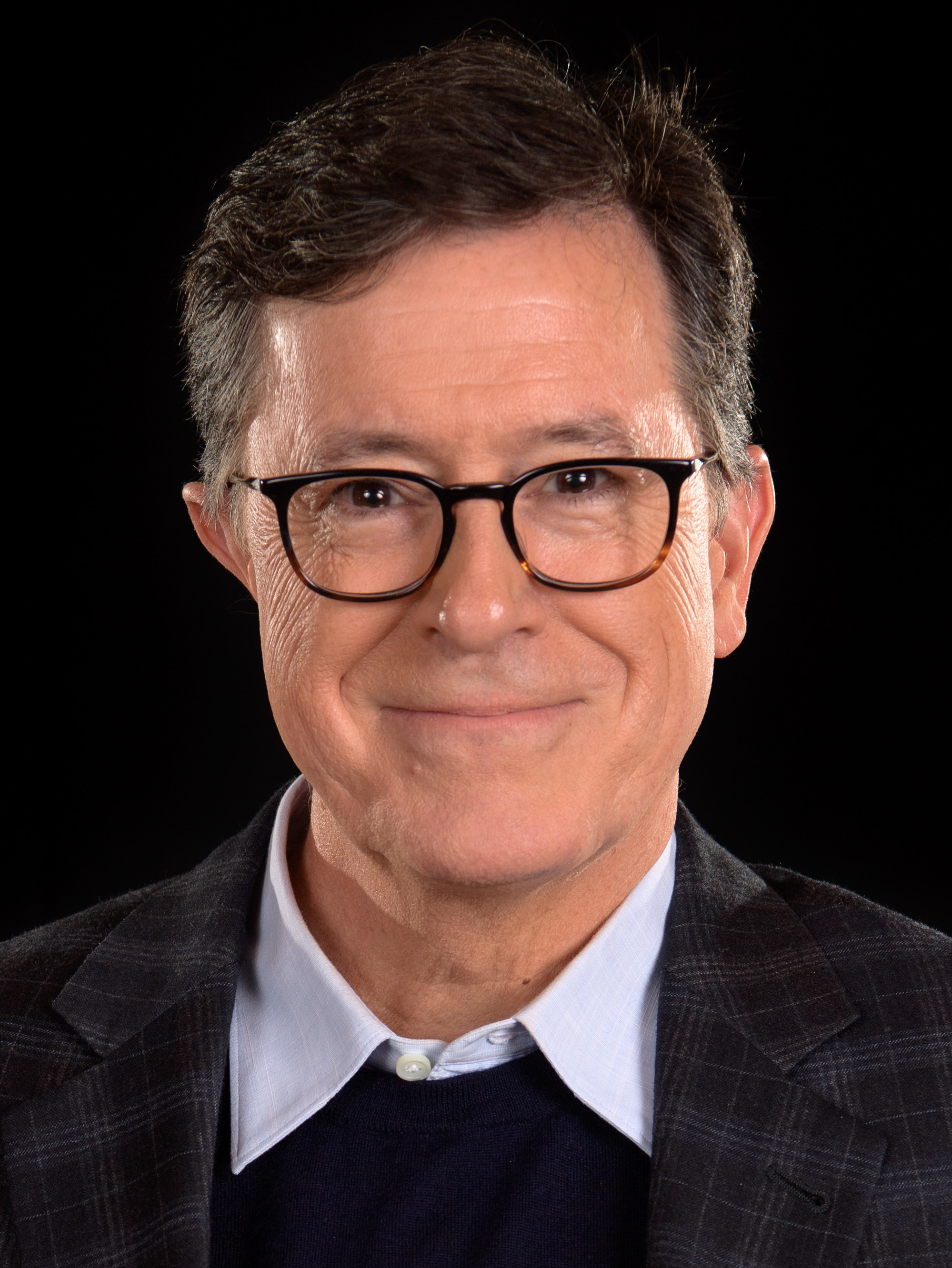
Stephen Colbert in 2019

Comedian Stephen Colbert made repeated references to Wikipedia on his television show The Colbert Report, frequently suggesting on-air that his viewers vandalize selected pages. These instances include the following:

- On a 2006 episode of his show, Colbert suggested viewers vandalize the article "Elephant". This resulted in many elephant-related articles being protected.
- On 7 August 2012, Colbert suggested that his viewers go to pages for possible 2012 U.S. Republican vice-presidential candidates, such as the Tim Pawlenty and Rob Portman articles, and edit them many times. This was in response to a Fox News hypothesis that mass editing of the Sarah Palin page the day before she was announced as John McCain's running mate could help predict who would be chosen as Mitt Romney's running mate in the 2012 election. After Colbert's request and his viewers' subsequent actions, all these articles were put under semi-protection by Wikipedia administrators, with editing restricted to established users.

=== Hillsborough disaster vandalism ===
In April 2014, the Liverpool Echo reported that computers on an intranet used by the British government had been used to post offensive remarks about the Hillsborough disaster on Wikipedia pages relating to the subject. The government announced that it would launch an inquiry into the reports. Following the allegations, The Daily Telegraph reported that government computers appeared to have been used to vandalize a number of other articles, often adding insulting remarks to biographical articles, and in one case falsely reporting a death.

=== Political vandalism ===
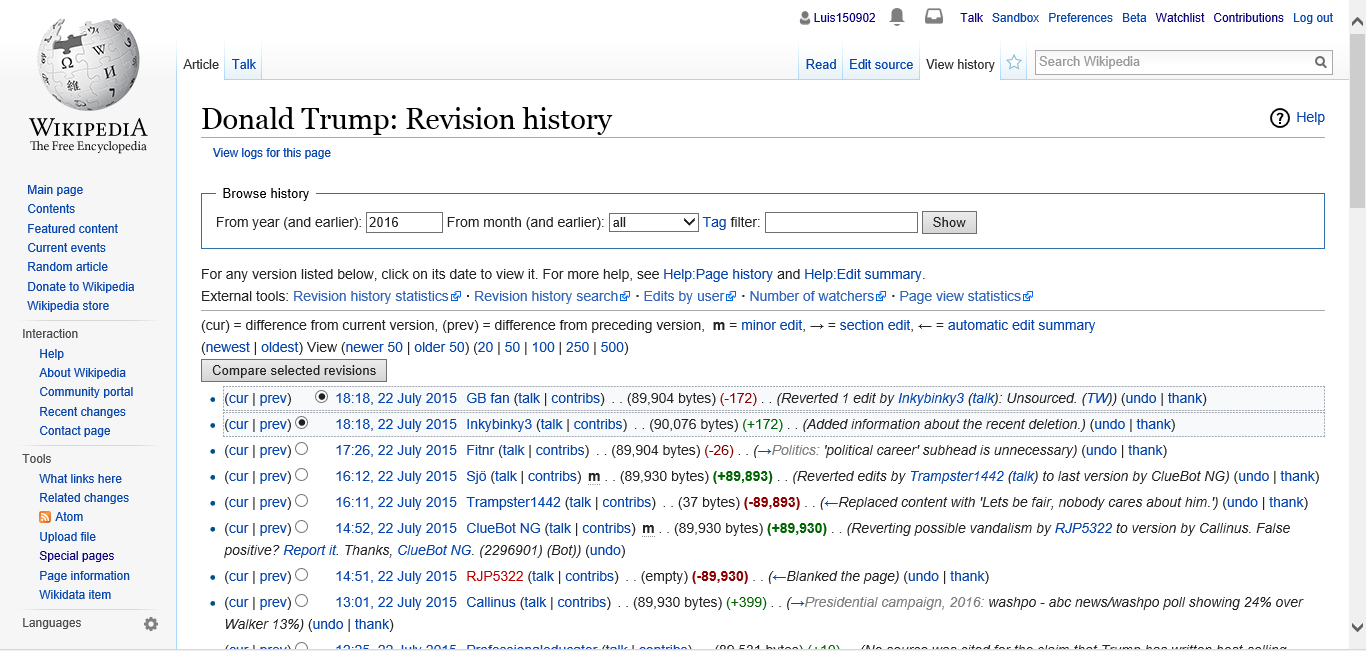
The article for Donald Trump was blanked twice on 22 July 2015.

Politicians are a common target of vandalism on Wikipedia. The article on Donald Trump was replaced with a single sentence critical of him in July 2015, and in November 2018, the lead picture on the page was replaced with an image of a penis, causing Apple's virtual assistant Siri to briefly include this image in answers to queries about the subject. Both Hillary and Bill Clinton's Wikipedia pages were vandalized in October 2016 by a member of the internet trolling group Gay Nigger Association of America adding pornographic images to their articles. That same month, New York Assembly candidate Jim Tedisco's Wikipedia page was modified to say that he had "never been part of the majority", and "is considered by many to be a total failure". Tedisco expressed dismay at the changes to his page. On 24 July 2018, United States Senator Orrin Hatch posted humorous tweets after Google claimed that he had died on 11 September 2017, with the error being traced back to an edit to his Wikipedia article. Similarly, vandalism of the California Republican Party's Wikipedia page caused Google's information bar to list Nazism as one of the party's primary ideologies.

On 7 May 2015 in the United Kingdom, ahead of the 2015 General Election, the Wikipedia pages for several high-profile politicians - including Conservative Party leader David Cameron, Liberal Democrat leader Nick Clegg, the leader of UKIP Nigel Farage, and Green Party co-leader Caroline Lucas - were all vandalised to display a giant red background, a large photograph of Labour Party leader Ed Miliband, and the message "VOTE LABOUR". At the same time, allegations surfaced that a Wikipedia account by the name of "Contribsx" had edited Conservative Party Chairman Grant Shapps' biography to remove negative references to Shapps' business dealings, while adding negative material to the biographies of Shapps' political opponents, such as the then Foreign Secretary, Philip Hammond, and Justine Greening, the then International Development Secretary. While Wikipedia administrators blocked the account for sock-puppetry, Shapps and Conservative Party spokespersons strongly denied the claims that the Contribsx account was linked to Shapps.

In a November 2015 op-ed in The Guardian, comedian Bridget Christie admitted to repeatedly vandalising the Wikipedia page of Conservative peer, the Lord Lloyd-Webber, branding him a "cat laxative" in protest over reports that Lloyd-Webber had flown from abroad on his personal plane to vote in favour of the government's proposed cuts to tax credits for the working poor.

The week of 29 January 2017 saw various acts of Wikipedia vandalism that attracted media attention. White House Press Secretary Sean Spicer's Wikipedia page was vandalized and his picture replaced with that of Baghdad Bob, Dana J. Boente's page description was edited to read that he was "the newest sock puppet for the Trump Administration", and Paul Ryan's picture was added to a list of invertebrates, with the edit summary stating that he was added due to his lack of a spine.

On 27 September 2018, the personal information of U.S. senators Lindsey Graham, Mike Lee, and Orrin Hatch were added to their respective Wikipedia articles during the hearing of Supreme Court nominee Brett Kavanaugh. The information included their home addresses and phone numbers, and originated from the network located from within the United States House of Representatives. The edits were removed from Wikipedia and hidden from public view shortly afterwards. These edits were captured and automatically posted publicly to Twitter by an automated account. Twitter shortly removed the posts and suspended the account in response to the incident. An internal police investigation located the person who made the edits, and 27-year-old Jackson A. Cosko (a staffer for Congress paid by an outside institution) was arrested and charged with multiple felony crimes relating to the incident. Cosko was sentenced in 2019 to four years in prison after pleading guilty to five felonies.

In September 2025, the Wikipedia article of Filipino lawmaker Zaldy Co was vandalized, with his surname changed to "Co-rakot"—a pun on the Filipino word kurakot meaning "corrupt"—and later to "Co-rrupt." The edits coincided with news reports linking him to alleged irregularities in government flood control projects. The page was restored to its original version two hours after the tampering was detected.

=== Miscellaneous ===
- A vandal called "Willy on Wheels" moved thousands of articles so that their titles ended with "on wheels".
- In 2006, Rolling Stone printed a story about Halle Berry based on false information from Wikipedia, which had arisen from an act of Wikipedia vandalism.
- In the music video for "Weird Al" Yankovic's 2006 song "White & Nerdy", Yankovic is shown editing the Wikipedia page for Atlantic Records, replacing the entire page with "YOU SUCK!" written in a large font; this was in reference to a dispute he had with Atlantic over the release of his song "You're Pitiful". The music video spawned copycat vandalism that resulted in Atlantic's page getting protected. Herald Sun writer Cameron Adams interviewed Yankovic in October 2006 and brought up the vandalism, to which Yankovic responded "I don't officially approve of that, but on a certain level it does amuse me".
- In February 2007, professional golfer Fuzzy Zoeller sued a Miami company whose IP-based edits to the Wikipedia site included negative information about him.
- In August 2007, local media from the Netherlands reported that several IP addresses from Nederlandse Publieke Omroep had been blocked from Wikipedia for adding "false and defamatory" information to pages. A similar incident occurred with the Minister of the Interior in France in January 2016.
- In May 2012, media critic Anita Sarkeesian created a Kickstarter project, intending to raise money to make a series of videos exploring sexism in digital gaming culture. The idea evoked a hostile response, which included repeated vandalism of Sarkeesian's Wikipedia article with pornographic imagery, defamatory statements, and threats of sexual violence. More than 12 IP addresses from unregistered editors contributed to the ongoing vandalism campaign before editing privileges were revoked for the page.
- In November 2012, the Leveson report – published in the UK by Lord Justice Leveson – incorrectly listed a "Brett Straub" as one of the founders of The Independent newspaper. The name originated from one of the several erroneous edits by one of Straub's friends as a prank to Wikipedia by falsely including his name in several articles across the site. The name's inclusion in the report suggested that part of the report relating to that newspaper had been cut and pasted from Wikipedia without a proper check of the sources. The Straub issue was also humorously referenced in broadcasts of BBC entertainment current affairs television program Have I Got News for You (and extended edition Have I Got a Bit More News for You), with The Economist also making passing comment on the issue: "The Leveson report ... Parts of it are a scissors-and-paste job culled from Wikipedia."
- In April 2015, The Washington Post reported on an experiment by "Gregory Kohs, a former editor, and prominent Wikipedia critic": "Kohs wrapped up an experiment in which he inserted outlandish errors into 31 articles and tracked whether editors ever found them. After more than two months, half of his hoaxes still had not been found – and those included errors on high-profile pages, like "Mediterranean climate" and "inflammation". (By his estimate, more than 100,000 people have now seen the claim that volcanic rock produced by the human body causes inflammation pain.)"
- On 2 December 2015, an Australian man named David Spargo listed himself as a family member on Peking Duk's Wikipedia page at a concert in Melbourne to attempt to get backstage and meet the band. When he showed the vandalized article and his ID to the security guard, he was granted access to the backstage area where they shared a beer. The band reacted positively to this, stating that he is "the definition of a legend."
- In August 2016, a sentence was added to Chad le Clos's Wikipedia page saying that he "Died at the hands of Michael Phelps, being literally blown out of the water by the greatest American since Abraham Lincoln" after Phelps won the gold medal for 200-meter butterfly at the 2016 Summer Olympics. This particular instance of Wikipedia vandalism attracted moderate media attention.
- On 25 April 2018, various pages related to American video game director Todd Howard were vandalized after a post went viral on Tumblr stating that his page would no longer be semi-protected as of said date. Although Howard's page had its protection extended, a massive raid campaign vandalized many related pages. These included "The Elder Scrolls V: Skyrim" (the most popular game he worked on) and "Lower Macungie Township, Pennsylvania" (his hometown).
- On 16 August 2021, a template that was transcluded onto approximately 53,000 pages was replaced with a swastika. The vandalism was reverted five minutes later.
- The 2022 film Tár includes a scene showing the Wikipedia article of Lydia Tár, the main character, having been vandalized with the text "LOL, this actually got vandalised!". A hoax page on the character was later created on Wikipedia.
- In February 2026, Swedish singer and songwriter Zara Larsson accused vandals of deliberately editing her Wikipedia page to include "unflattering pictures" of her.
- On 25 August 2026, after the death of Dolly Parton was announced, her Wikipedia page was vandalized multiple times. "Jew Lover" and "Adam Lanza was a hero" were added to her page, and her infobox image was replaced with a Swastika. All three of the vandalism edits were quickly removed.

== See also ==
- Operation Orangemoody
- Reliability of Wikipedia
- Vandalism
