= List of critics of Wikipedia =

The following is a list of notable individuals who have criticized Wikipedia. Wikipedia has been criticized since it was created in 2001. Most of the criticism has been directed toward its content, community of volunteer editors, process, and rules. Wikipedia has been criticized for its factual reliability, the readability and organization of its articles, the lack of methodical fact-checking, its political bias, and systemic bias (such as a gender bias against women or a geographical bias against the Global South).

Many sources have noted that critics of Wikipedia have been politically on the right, (Note: Attributed to multiple sources:) though there are exceptions. For example, British-American entrepreneur Andrew Keen critiques the website from a broader perspective, as he is a critic of the entire internet.

To be considered for this list, multiple reliable sources must explicitly state that the person is known for criticizing Wikipedia. (Note: There have been many notable individuals who have exclusively criticized Wikipedia on their own blog, website, or YouTube channel, such as John Stossel and J. J. McCullough. This list will only include people whose criticisms have been written about in secondary sources.) The individuals must be known for criticizing most if not the whole of Wikipedia, and not just a few articles or their own articles. For example, the co-founder of Wikipedia, Jimmy Wales, who has criticized the "Gaza genocide" article, will not be included on this list.

== Critics ==
=== 2000s ===
==== Larry Sanger ====
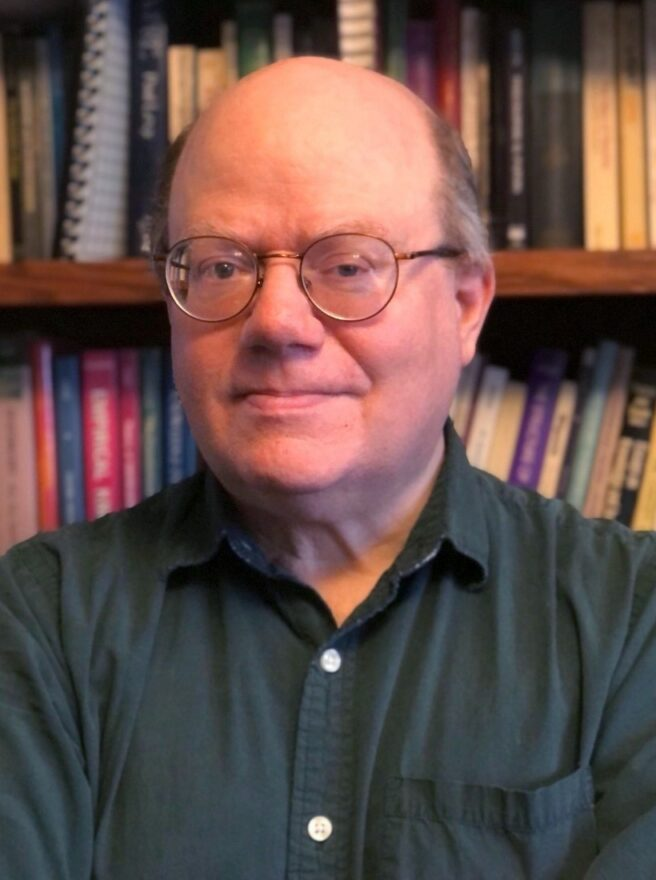
Larry Sanger in 2025

Sanger is an American Internet project developer and philosopher who co-founded Wikipedia with Jimmy Wales. Since his departure in 2002, Sanger has been cynical about the encyclopedia, its policies and administrators, and the Wikimedia Foundation. In 2015, Vice referred to Sanger as "Wikipedia's Most Outspoken Critic".

Since Sanger's departure from Wikipedia, he has been critical of the project, describing it in 2007 as being "broken beyond repair." He argues that Wikipedia lacks credibility and is inaccurate due to its supposed lack of respect for expertise. He has also accused Wikipedia of having a left-wing ideological bias in its articles, presenting a liberal and "establishment point of view." He went on to found and work for competitors of Wikipedia, including Citizendium and Everipedia. In April 2010, Sanger sent a letter to the Federal Bureau of Investigation (FBI) about his concern that Wikimedia Commons was hosting child pornography and later clarified the object of his concern was "obscene visual representations of the abuse of children" and not photographs. Sanger's effort to change Wikipedia was received negatively by editors of the English Wikipedia.

In 2025, Sanger released the Nine Theses, an essay discussing a reform proposal for Wikipedia. Named after Martin Luther's Ninety-five Theses, Sanger wrote a 37,000 word document that outlines nine suggestions for strengthening the project's neutrality. Several of his proposals are aimed at ending the supposed dominance of editors with a "GASP" worldview, an acronym made by Sanger that stands for Globalist, Academic, Secular, and Progressive. One proposal seeks to allow competing articles on topics rather than seeking what he perceived as a false consensus on a single definitive entry. Another is to add features allowing the public to rate articles and be able to post fact-checking in the style of X's community notes. Sanger argued that right-wing sources such as Fox News, the New York Post, and Breitbart News should be accepted as equally reliable as other sources like The New York Times. He urges that his "early joke rule" of ignore all rules be repealed and that "the most powerful users" be made to reveal their full names. Sanger further expresses support for additional scrutiny of Wikipedia users, saying that "admins and those with significant authority in the system should be as easily named and shamed as any ordinary journalist." His essay was published on his blog and his Wikipedia user page in 2025, and was promoted on American conservative political commentator Tucker Carlson's podcast. Reception was mixed among English Wikipedia's editing community. One criticism was that Sanger's proposal suggesting editors with advanced permissions reveal their real life identities may introduce too much public accountability, in a similar manner to how journalists are publicly known.

In June 2026, Sanger was banned from editing the English Wikipedia after the community determined that he had violated its "canvassing" rule by tweeting about a community discussion on his proposed "WikiProject Intellectual Diversity" on X. Some in the community also concluded that he was "not here" to constructively build the encyclopedia. He criticized the ban and lack of due process, calling it a "kangaroo court" and accused Wikipedia administrators of not providing formal charges, or neutral adjudication.

==== Andrew Orlowski ====
Orlowski is a British columnist, investigative journalist and former executive editor of the IT news and opinion website The Register. From 2004 to May 2021, Orlowski has criticized the English Wikipedia. In May 2004, he approvingly quoted a Register reader who had called Wikipedia enthusiasts "the Khmer Rouge in diapers". Writing about Wikipedia in 2005, he observed: "Readability, which wasn't great to begin with, has plummeted. Formerly coherent and reasonably accurate articles in the technical section have gotten worse as they've gotten longer." In a 2005 BBC article, Bill Thompson said Orlowski was "scathing in his dismissal of the site as a cult-like organisation where faith triumphs rationality, and even suggests we look at English Wikipedia as 'a massively scalable, online role-playing game' where 'players can assume fictional online identities and many "editors" do just that'." In 2021, Orlowski writing for The Daily Telegraph has criticised Wikimedia Foundation fundraising, arguing that the organisation has far more money than its appeals make people believe. He has also called Wikipedia "Wokepedia."

==== Jorge Cauz ====
Cauz is an American businessman and entrepreneur of Mexican descent and the former President and CEO of Encyclopædia Britannica Inc. From September 2004 to March 2012, Cauz became outspoken in criticizing Wikipedia, which many view as a significant competitive threat to Britannica, a threat which Cauz has downplayed. In July 2006, Cauz personally entered the fray in an interview in The New Yorker, in which he predicted Wikipedia would "decline into a hulking, mediocre mass of uneven, unreliable, and... unreadable articles", and elsewhere analogizing "Wikipedia... to Britannica as American Idol is to the Juilliard School". In January 2009, Cauz criticized Google for promoting Wikipedia in its search rankings, saying "If I were to be the CEO of Google or the founders of Google I would be very [displeased] that the best search engine in the world continues to provide as a first link, Wikipedia", and then querying, "Is this the best that [their] algorithm can do?". When Britannica announced that they would stop selling their printed encyclopedia in March 2012, Cauz said that "Britannica won't be able to be as large, but it will always be factually correct." referencing Wikipedia's larger size.

==== Robert McHenry ====
McHenry is an American editor, encyclopedist, philanthropist and writer. In October 2004, McHenry participated in a review of seven Wikipedia articles of general interest, reviewing the entry for Encyclopedia, repeating his concerns about the entry's usefulness and giving it a 5/10 rating. That November, McHenry wrote an article for Tech Central Station (later renamed TCS Daily) in which he criticized Wikipedia, saying it was operating on what he believed was a false premise; that allowing anyone to edit articles, whether or not they were knowledgeable, would lead to evolution of article quality. McHenry's articles about Wikipedia have produced responses from other writers. Aaron Krowne considered McHenry's article to be an attack on the credibility of the commons-based peer production, for which he saw already strong evidence of success.

==== John Seigenthaler ====
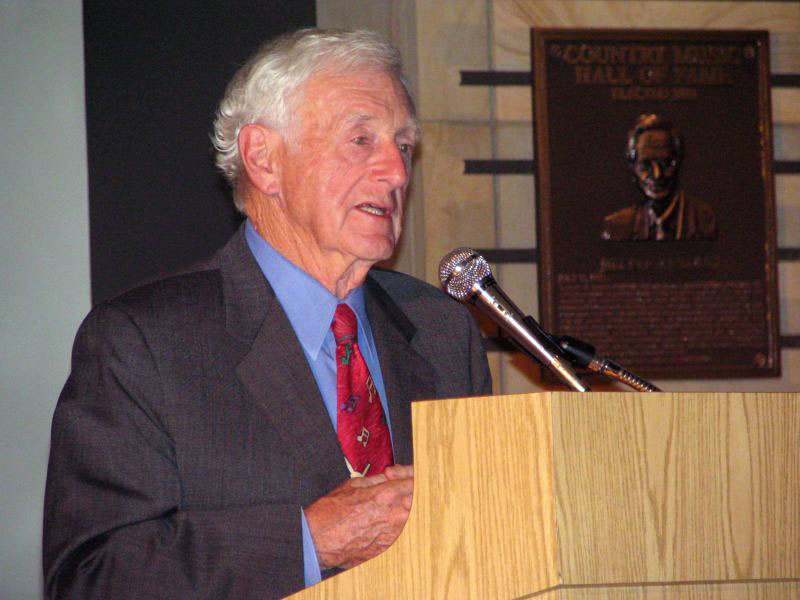
John Seigenthaler was the subject of a defamatory Wikipedia hoax article in May 2005. The hoax raised questions about the reliability of Wikipedia and other websites with user-generated content.

Seigenthaler was an American journalist, writer, and political figure. He was known as a prominent defender of First Amendment rights. On May 26, 2005, an unregistered editor created a hoax article on English Wikipedia about Seigenthaler. The article falsely stated that Seigenthaler had been a suspect in the assassinations of U.S. president John F. Kennedy and U.S. attorney general Robert F. Kennedy. After the hoax was discovered and corrected later in September, Seigenthaler, a friend and aide to Robert Kennedy, wrote an article in USA Today describing the Wikipedia page as an "Internet character assassination". The hoax raised questions about the reliability of Wikipedia and other websites with user-generated content. The incident damaged Wikipedia's credibility and reputation.

In an article Seigenthaler wrote for USA Today in late 2005, he said, "I am interested in letting many people know that Wikipedia is a flawed and irresponsible research tool." In the June 2007 issue of Reason magazine, Seigenthaler also expressed concern about the lack of transparency underlined by Wales's removal of the hoax pages from the article's history page. He also stated that many of the comments left by users in the edit summaries were things he would not want his nine-year-old grandson to see. Seigenthaler died of complications from colon cancer on July 11, 2014, at the age of 86, surrounded by his family in his home.

==== Jaron Lanier ====
Lanier is an American computer scientist, futurist, and composer. In his online essay "Digital Maoism: The Hazards of the New Online Collectivism", in Edge magazine in May 2006, Lanier criticized the sometimes-claimed omniscience of collective wisdom (including examples such as the Wikipedia article about him, which he said recurrently exaggerates his film-directing work), describing it as "digital Maoism". He writes: "If we start to believe that the Internet itself is an entity that has something to say, we're devaluing those people [creating the content] and making ourselves into idiots." In his book You Are Not a Gadget (2010), Lanier criticizes Wikipedia and Linux as examples of this problem; Wikipedia for what he sees as: its "mob rule" by anonymous editors, the weakness of its non-scientific content, and its bullying of experts. Lanier also said that "Wikipedia is run by super-nice people who are my friends." However noting, "The notion of having the perfect encyclopedia is just weird."

==== Stephen Colbert ====
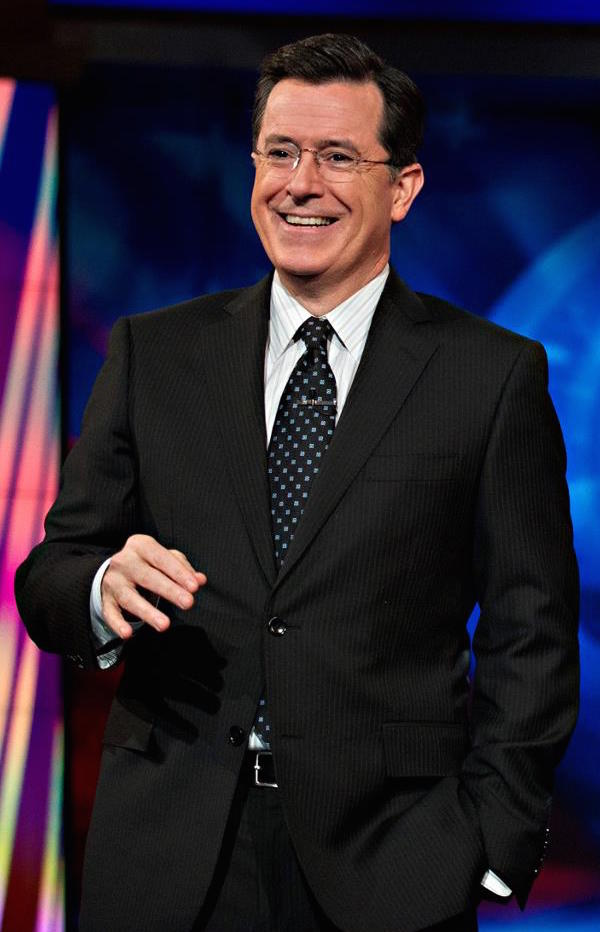
Stephen Colbert in 2011, in character

Colbert is an American comedian, writer, producer, political commentator, actor, and television host. He used a fictionalized persona of himself on the Comedy Central series The Daily Show and The Colbert Report, and occasionally on The Late Show with Stephen Colbert on CBS.

Colbert made repeated references on the show to Wikipedia, which he referred to as his favorite website, generally in "The Wørd" segment. Colbert's first reference to Wikipedia was during the July 31, 2006 broadcast, when "The Word" was Wikiality, defined as the concept that "together we can create a reality that we all agree on – the reality we just agreed on". The premise of wikiality is that reality is what the wiki says it is. He ironically praised Wikipedia for following his philosophy of truthiness in which intuition and consensus are a better reflection of reality than fact. He explained that on Wikipedia "any user can change any entry, and if enough users agree with them, it becomes true". He also told his viewers to edit the Wikipedia article on elephants to say: "Elephant population in Africa has tripled over the past six months." The suggestion resulted in numerous changes to Wikipedia articles related to elephants and Africa. Editing of the articles concerned was restricted to prevent further edits. The pages' protection expiration date has been postponed several times as the vandalism ensued again.

Another Colbert neologism related to Wikipedia is "Wikilobbying", regarding which he stated "when money determines Wikipedia entries, reality has become a commodity". Colbert used the term "self-determination" to refer to corporations being able to act out their fantasies online by editing their own Wikipedia entries. Colbert described Wikipedia as "Second Life for corporations", saying that if a corporation wants to pretend to be someone else online, then that is their business. In Jimmy Wales's 2025 book, The Seven Rules of Trust, Wales said retrospectively "I winced. That's not really how Wikipedia works, I thought, as I watched the show. And Wikiality? Ouch." Wales also noted that while Colbert's fictionalized persona is satirical, "the consequences of his monologue were decidedly real."

==== Andrew Schlafly ====
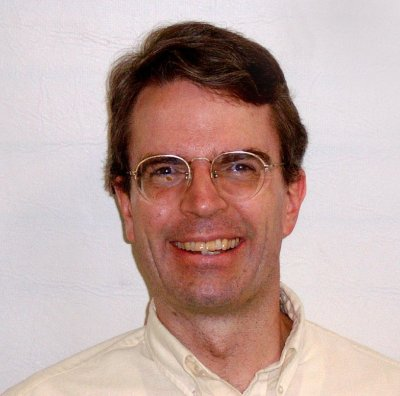
Andrew Schlafly in 2007

Schlafly is an American lawyer, and Christian conservative activist. He is the founder and owner of the wiki encyclopedia project Conservapedia.

Schlafly created the wiki-based Conservapedia in November 2006 to counter what he perceived as a liberal bias present in Wikipedia. He felt the need to start the project after reading a student's assignment written using Common Era dating notation, rather than the Anno Domini system that he preferred. Although he was "an early Wikipedia enthusiast", as reported by Shawn Zeller of Congressional Quarterly, Schlafly became concerned about perceived bias after Wikipedia editors repeatedly undid his edits to the article about the 2005 Kansas evolution hearings. Schlafly expressed hope that Conservapedia would become a general resource for American educators and a counterpoint to the liberal bias that he perceived in Wikipedia.

Conservapedia has been accused of spreading misinformation on scientific subjects, such as HIV/AIDS denialism, the abortion–breast cancer hypothesis, climate change denial, relativity denial, and vaccine/autism connections, and has advocated Young Earth creationism, Barack Obama citizenship conspiracy theories and conspiracy theories that the January 6 United States Capitol attack was staged. Additionally, it features extensive criticisms of atheism, feminism, homosexuality, and the Democratic Party.

==== Neil L. Waters ====
Waters is an American historian of Japan. He is Kawashima Emeritus Professor of History and Japanese Studies at Middlebury College. Since February 2007, Waters is notable for his criticism of the reliability of Wikipedia. He has compared Wikipedia to the game show Family Feud, in which contestants try to guess the most popular answer, rather than the most accurate one. Waters instigated a policy in the Middlebury College history department that banned students from citing Wikipedia as a source, and drafted the original policy statement. Waters realized that many of his students were relying on Wikipedia after noticing that several of them made the erroneous claim that the Jesuits had supported the Shimabara Rebellion, and that this false information ultimately came from Wikipedia.

The Wikimedia Foundation responded to the policy with a statement saying that "Wikipedia is the ideal place to start your research and get a global picture of a topic; however, it is not an authoritative source." Wikipedia co-founder Jimmy Wales said that he did not disagree with Waters's stance, saying "Basically, they are recommending exactly what we suggested students shouldn't be citing encyclopedias. I would hope they wouldn't be citing Encyclopaedia Britannica, either." In an article published September 1, 2007, Waters wrote that some editors "through ignorance, sloppy research, or, on occasion, malice or zeal, can and do introduce or perpetuate errors in fact or interpretation." As of 2010, Waters continued to ban the citation of Wikipedia in his classroom, commenting that Wikipedia's editing policies did not encourage students to avoid mistakes or take responsibility for their writing.

==== Robert L. Park ====
Park was an American professor of physics at the University of Maryland, College Park, and a former director of public information at the Washington office of the American Physical Society. Park was most noted for his critical commentaries on alternative medicine and pseudoscience, as well as his criticism of how legitimate science is distorted or ignored by the media. In March 23, 2007, Park expressed his opinion that Wikipedia is a target for misuse by the "purveyors of pseudoscience", though he also stated that he finds the site to be both indispensable and "cool". Park died April 29, 2020, survived by his wife and two sons.

==== Nicholas G. Carr ====
Carr is an American journalist and writer who has published books and articles on technology, business, and culture. In May 2007, Carr argued that the dominance of Wikipedia pages in many search results represents a dangerous consolidation of Internet traffic and authority, which may be leading to the creation of what he called "information plantations". Carr coined the term "wikicrats" (a pejorative description of Wikipedia administrators) in August 2007, as part of a more general critique of what he sees as Wikipedia's tendency to develop ever more elaborate and complex systems of rules and bureaucratic ranks or castes over time.

==== Tom Wolfe ====
Wolfe was an American author and journalist widely known for his association with New Journalism, a style of news writing and journalism developed in the 1960s and 1970s that incorporated literary techniques. In July 2007, he criticized Wikipedia, saying that "only a primitive would believe a word of" it. He noted a story about him in his Wikipedia bio article at the time which he said had never happened. Wolfe died from an infection in Manhattan on May 14, 2018, at the age of 88.

==== Katina Schubert ====
Schubert is a German politician who is serving as leader of the Berlin branch of The Left and member of the Abgeordnetenhaus of Berlin since 2016. On 6 December 2007, Schubert filed a criminal complaint against the Wikimedia Foundation due to "the use of anti-constitutional symbols" on German Wikipedia. Specifically, she cited the displaying of Nazi iconography on articles, such as that of the Hitler Youth, claiming that it "goes beyond what is needed for documentation and political education". She stated that she was concerned about how platforms such as Wikipedia could be exploited by far-right extremists to promote their views, and hoped to spark a public debate about the issue. Her actions drew significant criticism, including from her party. Fellow Left politician Heiko Hilker rejected Schubert's position, saying that "she fails to grasp the self-regulating mechanisms that work in Wikipedia." After a conversation with Wikimedia representatives, Schubert withdrew her complaint the next day, though she maintained her criticism of the site.

==== Andrew Keen ====
Keen is a British-American entrepreneur and author. He is particularly known for his view that the current Internet culture and the Web 2.0 trend may be debasing culture, an opinion he shares with Jaron Lanier and Nicholas G. Carr among others. He critiques Wikipedia from a broader perspective, as he is a critic of the entire internet. On 5 June 2007, Keen released his first book The Cult of the Amateur, published by Doubleday Currency, and gave a talk at Google the same day. The book is critical of free, user-generated content websites such as Wikipedia, YouTube, Digg, Reddit and many others. He prominently featured in the 2008 Dutch documentary The Truth According to Wikipedia and was also featured in the 2010 American documentary Truth in Numbers?.

==== Aaron Klein ====
Klein is an American-Israeli conservative political commentator, journalist, strategist, bestselling author, and senior advisor to Prime Minister Benjamin Netanyahu. In March 2009, Klein criticized Wikipedia for what he described as preferential treatment of Barack Obama coverage. Klein said that Wikipedia editors had scrubbed the article of material critical of the president and that an editor had been suspended for attempting to add "missing" details about Obama's relationship with Bill Ayers and allegations that Obama was not born in the United States. Klein said similar negative content was found in the article of George W. Bush. A spokesperson for Wikipedia stated that the Obama article had not received any preferential treatment. Klein removed the name of the editor from the article after reports arose on blogs and Wired News that he might himself be the suspended editor described in the story (the editor's only previous work on Wikipedia was editing Klein's page). In an email sent in response to the Wired News article, Klein wrote that the editor "works with me and does research for me."

=== 2010s ===
==== Edwin Black ====
Black is an American historian and author, as well as a syndicated columnist, investigative journalist, and weekly talk show host on The Edwin Black Show. In April 2010, Black wrote an article critical of Wikipedia, "Wikipedia—The Dumbing Down of World Knowledge".

==== Alex Konanykhin ====
Konanykhin is an entrepreneur and former banker. His firm, KMGi established a subsidiary, WikiExperts.us, a business centered around creating Wikipedia articles for companies. Paid editing of Wikipedia has sparked considerable debate due to conflicts of interest. In March 2011, Konanykhin called for a boycott of Wikipedia fundraising campaigns, "We believe that boycotting fundraising efforts of Wikipedia might compel it to raise billions via advertising and develop content of significantly better quality."

==== Amanda Filipacchi ====
Filipacchi is a French-American novelist. In an April 2013 op-ed for The New York Times, Filipacchi criticized Wikipedia for moving female writers into subcategories like "American women novelists" and out of general categories such as "American novelists", calling it a "small, easily fixable thing" that hindered women's equality. She suggested that people may use Wikipedia categories "to get ideas for whom to hire, or honor, or read" and unquestioningly use the "American novelists" list. Other writers and commentators echoed her concerns about the perceived minimization of female novelists.

In a follow-up piece, Filipacchi stated that editors had targeted her Wikipedia biography page in retaliation for her criticism, which Andrew Leonard covered in more detail in Salon. Leonard quoted several combative remarks made by the primary proponent of "revenge editing" who was later revealed to be writer Robert Clark Young. Filipacchi later wrote in The Atlantic that the separate categorization of female novelists was not the work of a single editor, listing seven involved users. Three months later, she wrote a personal essay for The Wall Street Journal, which more humorously described the aftermath of the controversy, discussing how she became engrossed in discussions on Wikipedia and criticism site Wikipediocracy.

==== Vox Day ====
Day (real name Theodore Robert Beale) is an American activist and writer. He has been described as a far-right white supremacist, a misogynist, and part of the alt-right. In 2017, Beale launched Infogalactic, an English-language wiki encyclopedia. The site was a fork of the contents of English Wikipedia which could be gradually edited to remove the influence of what Beale described as "the left-wing thought police who administer [Wikipedia]". It has been described by Wired and The Washington Post as a version of Wikipedia targeted to alt-right readers. As of 2026, the website is inactive as a wiki. (Note: The website is now an "AI-powered" business.)

=== 2020s ===
==== Rob Monster ====
Monster is a Dutch-American technology executive. He is the founder, former chief executive officer, and former chairman of Epik, a domain registrar and web host known for providing services to websites that host far-right, and extremist content. In December 2021, Monster said that he believes that the mainstream media and Wikipedia spread propaganda, calling Wikipedia "a globalist tool".

==== Elon Musk ====
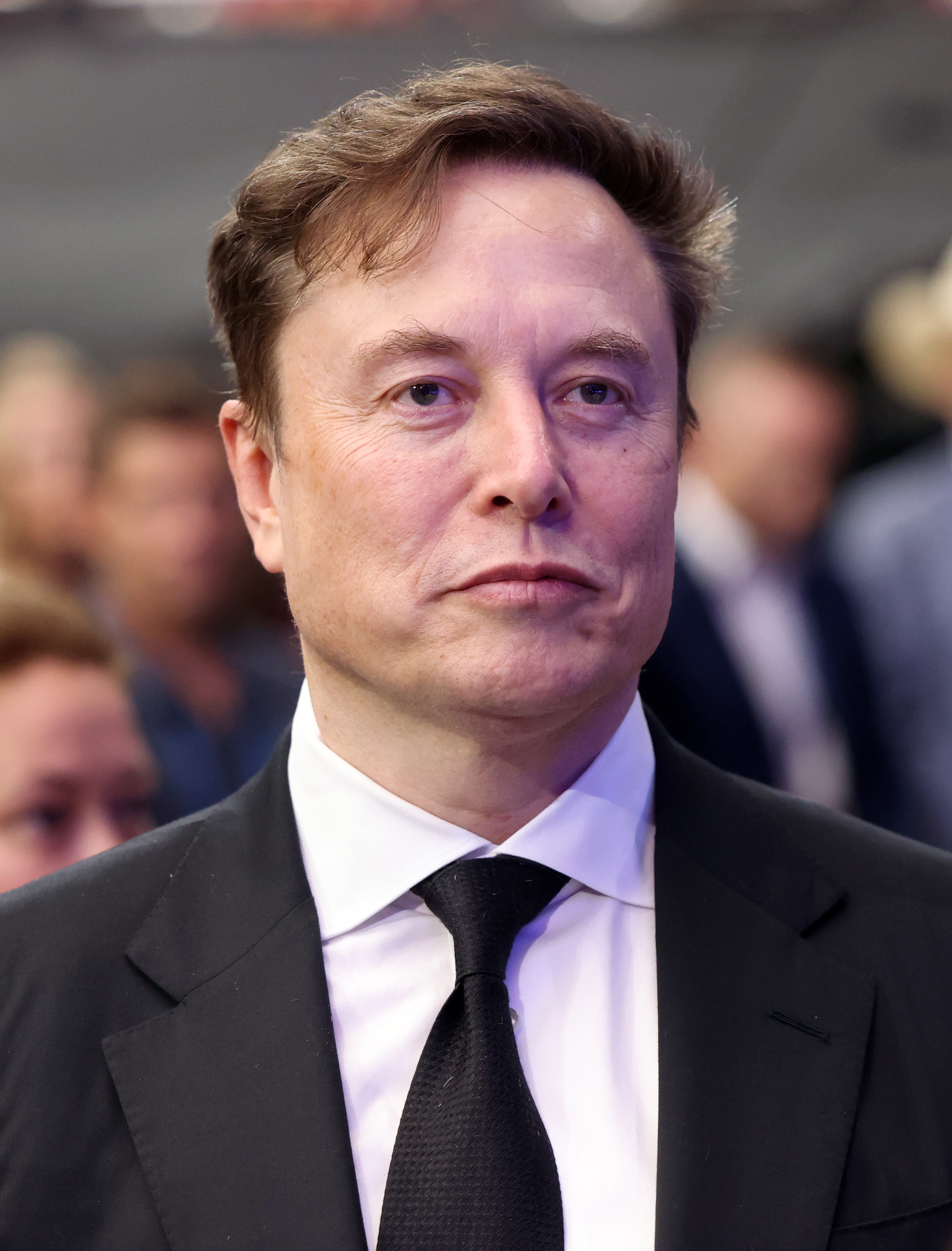
Elon Musk in 2025

Musk is a businessman and former public official who is the CEO and largest shareholder of Tesla and SpaceX. Musk has been the wealthiest person in the world since 2025, and became the only trillionaire in June 2026. Since 2022, Musk has been highly critical of Wikipedia; describing the encyclopedia as "woke", controlled by the mainstream media and far-left activists, and has called for its defunding.

In 2021, Musk expressed an affection for Wikipedia on its 20th anniversary. In 2022, however, Musk argued that Wikipedia was "losing its objectivity", and in 2023, said he would donate US$1 billion to the project if it was pejoratively renamed "Dickipedia". In December 2024, Musk called for a boycott of donations to Wikipedia over its perceived left-wing bias, calling it "Wokepedia". In January 2025, Musk made a series of statements on Twitter denouncing Wikipedia for its description of the incident where he made a controversial gesture, which many viewed as resembling a Nazi salute, at president Donald Trump's second inauguration. Musk has since positioned Grokipedia as an alternative to Wikipedia that would "purge out the propaganda" in the latter, with Musk describing Wikipedia as "woke" and an "extension of legacy media propaganda". In September 2025, Musk spoke about how Grok consumed data from Wikipedia and other sources to gain more complete knowledge of the world. David Sacks suggested publishing its knowledge base as an artifact called "Grokipedia", saying "Wikipedia is so biased, it's a constant war".

Compared to Wikipedia, the site gives more right-wing views on many subjects, such as the January 6 Capitol attack, OpenAI, Donald Trump, Gamergate, and Musk's own page. The site has been accused of spreading a variety of debunked conspiracy theories and ideas against scientific consensus on topics such as HIV/AIDS denialism, vaccines and autism, climate change, and race and intelligence. The site has been accused of whitewashing far-right extremism, such as by falsely claiming a white genocide is actively occurring. Several right-wing figures have welcomed the site. Studies have highlighted its use of sources deemed as having very low credibility such as Instagram reels and neo-Nazi forums, and for writing about far-right figures and topics in a promotional manner. A study by Cornell University researchers and NBC News stated that Grokipedia cites sources that are blacklisted or considered "generally unreliable" on Wikipedia, for example, the conspiracy site Infowars and the neo-Nazi forum Stormfront. Wired, The Guardian and Time criticized Grokipedia for factual errors and for presenting Musk himself in unusually positive terms while downplaying controversies. As of late April 2026, while the site is still live, there has been no updates to the contents of the website.

==== Ashley Rindsberg ====
Ashley Rindsberg in 2020

Rindsberg is a South African-born writer and journalist, who has contributed for multiple news websites and is the author of two books. Since 2024, Rindsberg has been critical of Wikipedia, accusing it of having bias in its coverage.

Rindsberg has written articles accusing Wikipedia of bias in its coverage, including in the Israeli–Palestinian conflict, the killing of Iryna Zarutska, and the assassination of Charlie Kirk. Author Stephen Harrison was critical of his coverage, writing in Slate: "Like much of Rindsberg's work, the point isn't to provide information to readers about what's happening on Wikipedia, but to stoke further outrage for attention." Rindsberg is creator and editor of NeutralPOV, a Substack newsletter dedicated to criticizing Wikipedia.

==== Sandi Toksvig ====
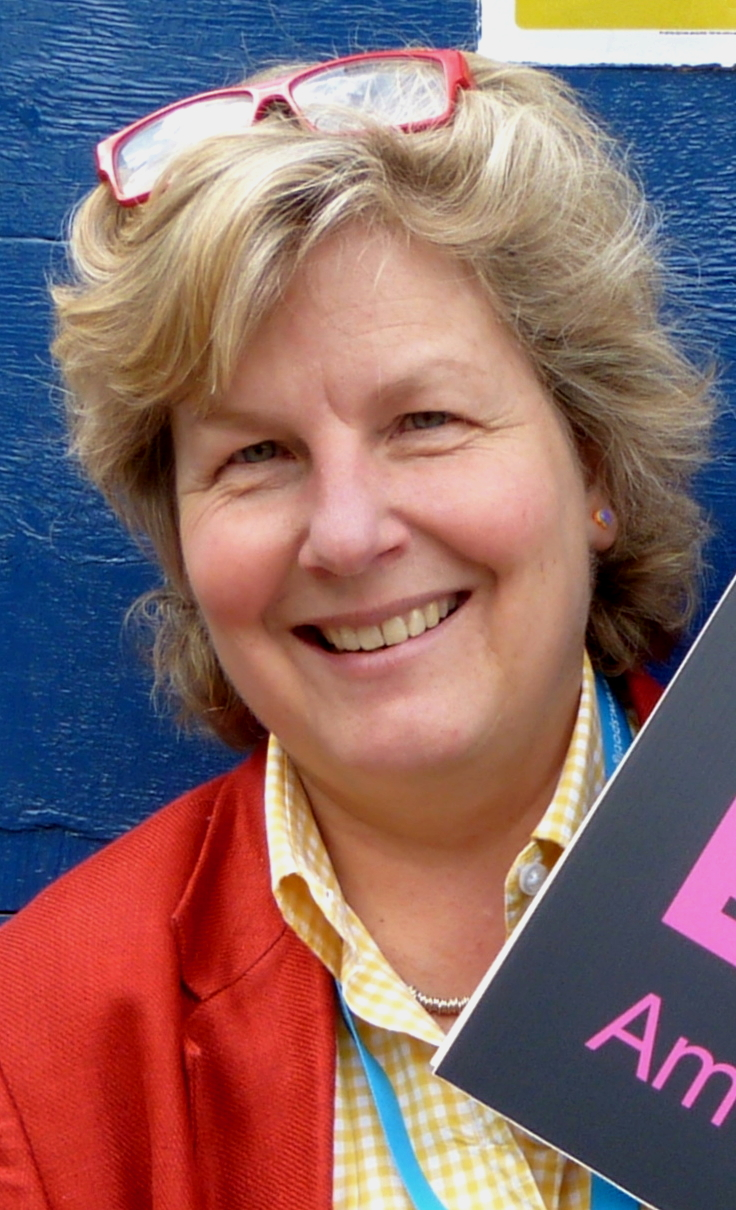
Sandi Toksvig in 2013

Sandi Toksvig, a Danish-British broadcaster and co-founder of the Women's Equality Party, criticised Wikipedia from a feminist perspective. At her appearance at the 2026 Cheltenham Literature Festival, Toksvig claimed that Wikipedia has a "patronising" attitude towards women, and described Wikipedia as "deeply biased" against women in both the quantity and quality of its content. She cited as an example the article on Canadian physicist Donna Strickland, which was repeatedly deleted for apparently breaching Wikipedia's notability guidelines until she won a Nobel Prize. She also criticised English Wikipedia for being overly centred on white European people and experiences, claiming that it is "85 per cent by and about white men". She blamed this on the site's open editing structure, as she said that "it is mostly white, middle-aged, European men who have both the time and the technology" who contribute to Wikipedia. As an alternative, Toksvig has advocated for the Mappa Mundi project, a collaboration between herself, the University of Cambridge and the Leverhulme Centre for the Future of Intelligence. The project is intended to help rectify sexist bias across the Internet, described by Toksvig as "an interactive digital atlas where we can find a home for the vast amount of knowledge that is currently sidelined or deleted".

== See also ==
- List of Wikipedia controversies
- List of Wikipedia people
