= Timeline of Wikipedia–U.S. government conflicts =

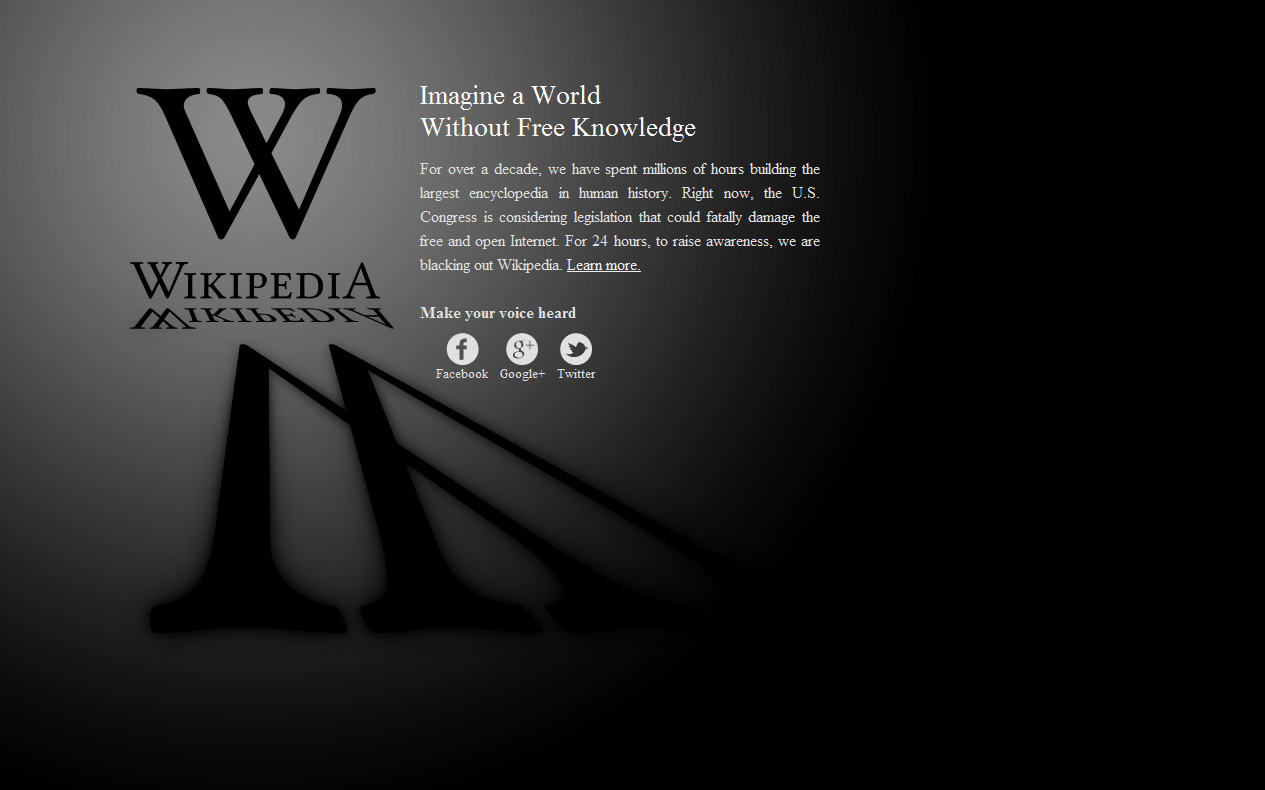
A screenshot of the English Wikipedia landing page, symbolically its only page during the blackout on January 18, 2012

Wikipedia—hosted by nonprofit organization the Wikimedia Foundation, Inc. (WMF)—has been involved with various conflicts with the federal government of the United States. Conflicts have included conflict of interest editing by the FBI and CIA, legal threats from the FBI, allegations of NSA mass surveillance of Wikipedia editors, and proposed laws affecting Wikipedia that have been met with significant backlash.

Since the 2024 United States presidential election, Wikipedia has more frequently been the target of political pressure by government officials in the second Trump administration, especially over allegations of antisemitism due to alleged pro-Palestinian bias during the Gaza war. In August 2025, House Republicans opened an investigation into Wikipedia, requesting unique characteristics of accounts—such as account names and IP addresses—of Wikipedia editors subject to ArbCom actions. This followed a series of actions by the government beginning in April 2025, which applied political pressure to Wikipedia after Trump-affiliated think tank the Heritage Foundation's Project Esther was noted as containing plans to dox Wikipedia editors using strategies such as phishing attacks.

== 2006: Congressional staff conflict of interest edits ==
Some edits to the online encyclopedia Wikipedia by staff of the United States Congress have created controversy, notably in early to mid-2006. Several such instances, such as those involving Marty Meehan, Norm Coleman, Conrad Burns, and Joe Biden, received significant media attention. Others, such as those involving Gil Gutknecht, were reported but received less widespread coverage. Biographical information on various politicians was edited by their own staff to remove undesirable information (including pejorative statements quoted, or broken campaign promises), add favorable information or "glowing" tributes, add negative information to opponents' biographies, or replace the article in part or whole by staff-authored biographies.

== 2007: FBI/CIA conflict of interest edits ==
In August 2007, computer researcher Virgil Griffith released WikiScanner, a public database that correlated anonymous Wikipedia edits with the owners of the editing IP address ranges by cross-referencing WHOIS data. Journalists and bloggers quickly used the tool to identify edits originating from U.S. government networks, including the CIA and the FBI.

Reporting based on WikiScanner found that CIA-addressed computers edited the 2003 invasion of Iraq article (including adding a disclaimer to a casualties graphic) and expanded material in the biography of former CIA director William Colby; an FBI-addressed computer removed aerial and satellite imagery from the Guantánamo Bay detention camp article. A Wikimedia Foundation spokeswoman said such conduct could run afoul of Wikipedia's conflict-of-interest guideline but emphasized that the site is "self-correcting", while a CIA spokesman said he could not confirm whether agency machines were used and that systems were expected to be used responsibly.

Although WikiScanner did not prove who sat at a keyboard (only that an edit came from a given network), its release spurred wide coverage of government and corporate conflict-of-interest editing and renewed attention to Wikipedia’s policies on neutrality and undisclosed editing.

== 2010: FBI legal threat over seal use ==
In 2010, the FBI sent a letter to Michael Godwin, General Counsel to the Wikimedia Foundation, Inc., accusing Wikipedia of facilitating violations of agency insignia limitations, saying "failure to comply may result in further legal action". Godwin responded to the FBI with a letter saying that "problematic" usage of the FBI seal on Wikipedia is not necessarily "unlawful", citing that the seal was neither an "assertion of authority" nor "intended to deceive", and informed them he would argue his case in court. Wikipedia continues to use the FBI's seal on its page about the FBI.

== 2011–2012: SOPA/PIPA and Wikipedia blackout ==
On January 18, 2012, a series of coordinated protests occurred against two proposed laws in the United States Congress—the Stop Online Piracy Act (SOPA) and the PROTECT IP Act (PIPA). These followed smaller protests in late 2011. Protests were based on concerns that the bills, intended to provide more robust responses to copyright infringement (also known as piracy) arising outside the United States, contained measures that could possibly infringe online freedom of speech, websites, and Internet communities. Protesters also argued that there were insufficient safeguards in place to protect sites based upon user-generated content.

On January 18, 2012, the English Wikipedia conducted a 24-hour blackout to oppose the Stop Online Piracy Act (SOPA) and PROTECT IP Act (PIPA) and to encourage readers to contact U.S. lawmakers; within days, congressional leaders postponed action on both bills.

== 2015–2024: Wikimedia Foundation v. NSA ==
Wikimedia Foundation, et al. v. National Security Agency, et al. was a lawsuit filed by the American Civil Liberties Union (ACLU) on behalf of the Wikimedia Foundation and several other organizations against the National Security Agency (NSA), the United States Department of Justice (DOJ), and other named individuals, alleging mass surveillance of Wikipedia users carried out by the NSA. The suit claims the surveillance system, which NSA calls "Upstream", breaches the First Amendment to the United States Constitution, which protects freedom of speech, and the Fourth Amendment to the United States Constitution, which prohibits unreasonable searches and seizures.

The suit was filed in the United States District Court for the District of Maryland as the NSA is based in Fort Meade, Maryland. The suit was dismissed in October 2015 by Judge T. S. Ellis III; this decision was appealed four months later to the Fourth Circuit Court of Appeals by the Wikimedia Foundation. The Court of Appeals found that the dismissal was valid for all of the plaintiffs except the Foundation, whose allegations the court found "plausible" enough to have legal standing for the case to be remanded to the lower court. In further rulings, the District Court, Court of Appeals, and U.S. Supreme Court (in declining to hear the case and invoking the state secrets privilege), ruled for the NSA, ending the litigation.

== 2020–2025: Elon Musk ==
Elon Musk, a major U.S. government figure by virtue of his companies' federal roles and his brief 2025 advisory stint, has repeatedly used his platform to pressure Wikipedia and the Wikimedia Foundation (WMF). In January 2025 the White House created the Department of Government Efficiency (DOGE) by executive order; Musk was associated with the effort before later distancing himself that spring. Separately, Musk's firms are key U.S. contractors: SpaceX and Starlink/Starshield hold U.S. National Reconnaissance Office and United States Space Force contracts, among others. Commentators have noted that this public stature amplifies his criticisms of Wikipedia.

In August 2020, Musk told his followers on Twitter/X to "please trash me on Wikipedia", prompting administrators to temporarily lock his biography due to vandalism and edit-warring. Earlier he had described his article as "a war zone with a zillion edits." From late 2022 onward, Musk repeatedly alleged that Wikipedia was biased or "controlled" by mainstream media or "far-left activists", including during disputes over the Twitter Files and coverage of his own actions; these claims were widely reported and criticized by media analysts.

Musk has mocked Wikipedia's fundraising banners and urged followers to stop donating to the WMF, calling the site "Wokepedia." In October 2023 he publicly offered "$1 billion" if Wikipedia would change its name to "Dickipedia," a taunting offer he later said "still stands"; media coverage characterized the gambit as an attempt to influence or embarrass the project. Following Musk's 2022 acquisition of Twitter, public speculation and posts suggesting he "buy Wikipedia to fix bias" prompted Jimmy Wales to respond that the encyclopedia was "not for sale"; the WMF later echoed that phrase in fundraising messages. Analyses in early 2025 framed Musk's subsequent "defund" push as part of a broader campaign against independent information institutions.

In January 2025, after editors briefly described a gesture by Musk at a presidential event as a "Nazi salute", he called Wikipedia "legacy media propaganda" and again urged defunding; Wales publicly rebutted him and invited constructive engagement. In September 2025, Musk announced xAI was building a new AI-generated online encyclopedia called Grokipedia. The project was suggested and named by David O. Sacks at the All-In Podcast Conference earlier that month. According to Musk's announcement, it will be an AI-powered knowledge base designed to rival Wikipedia by addressing its perceived biases, errors, and ideological slants. Gizmodo compared the plan to the 2006 Conservapedia project.

== 2024–2025: Project Esther ==
Project Esther is a project of the Heritage Foundation, a conservative think tank based in Washington, D.C., that aims to suppress pro-Palestinian protests and what it classifies as antisemitism. The effort has received support from several evangelical Christian organizations but no major Jewish ones. According to The New York Times, Slate, Haaretz, The Forward, and Jewish Insider, Project Esther does not address right-wing antisemitism.

Project Esther has been criticized for incorporating antisemitic tropes into its rhetoric. It broadly labels criticism of Israel as terrorism and calls for targeting universities, students, and American progressive politics and politicians. Politico described Project Esther as "a lesser-known blueprint from the same creators of Project 2025." In May 2025, The New York Times found that the second Trump administration had called for or acted upon more than half of Project Esther's proposals.

The New York Times characterized the initiative's goal as "branding a broad range of critics of Israel as 'effectively a terrorist support network,' so that they could be deported, defunded, sued, fired, expelled, ostracized and otherwise excluded from what it considered 'open society.'" Project Esther is run by Victoria Coates.

In January 2025, leaked documents from Heritage's Oversight Project detailed a plan to dox Wikipedia editors alleged to be antisemitic. Proposed tactics included using facial-recognition tools, cross-referencing against databases of hacked information, tricking Wikipedia users into visiting sites that harvest IP addresses, and operating sock-puppet accounts. Slate columnist Stephen Harrison compared the plan to the 2021 doxing campaign by pro-Chinese government editors, which resulted in some Hong Kong editors being physically harmed. Oversight Project director Mike Howell said the investigation into Wikipedia would be "shared with the appropriate policymakers to help inform a strategic response".

Following a month-long discussion, Wikipedia editors decided to blacklist the Heritage Foundation website, meaning attempts to link to it on Wikipedia are automatically blocked.

== April 2025: D.C. U.S. Attorney's letter questioning WMF's 501(c)(3) status ==
On 24 April 2025, acting United States Attorney for the District of Columbia Edward R. Martin Jr. sent a letter to the Wikimedia Foundation (WMF) alleging that Wikipedia "allows foreign actors to manipulate information and spread propaganda" and requesting documents to assess WMF's compliance with Section 501(c)(3) of the Internal Revenue Code. The letter sought materials from 1 January 2021 onward and set a response deadline of 15 May 2025, asking about content-moderation practices, handling of editor misconduct, safeguards against foreign influence, and interactions with search engines and large language model companies.

National coverage described the inquiry as testing WMF's charitable status; WMF emphasized its neutral point-of-view policy and volunteer-driven model in responses to the press. The letter also asserted that WMF "is incorporated in the District of Columbia"; WMF governance documents and public records identify the foundation as incorporated in Florida. In the same period, it was reported that Martin sent a "vaguely threatening" letter to The New England Journal of Medicine, accusing the journal of being "partisans in various scientific debates," and that at least three other medical journals received similar inquiries—placing the WMF letter within a broader pattern of outreach to knowledge-publishing organizations.

== May 2025: Bipartisan House letter about antisemitism on Wikipedia ==
On May 1, 2025, U.S. Representatives Debbie Wasserman Schultz (D–FL) and Don Bacon (R–NE) led a bipartisan group of twenty-three members in sending a letter to Maryana Iskander, CEO of the Wikimedia Foundation (WMF), expressing concern about antisemitism and anti-Israel bias on Wikipedia and requesting detailed information on safeguards, oversight, and transparency. The letter cited a March 2025 report by the Anti-Defamation League (ADL) alleging a coordinated, years-long campaign by approximately 30 editors to skew content on Israel-related pages, and referenced recent actions by Wikipedia’s English-language Arbitration Committee that resulted in topic bans for eight editors in the Israel–Palestine topic area.

The lawmakers asked WMF to describe (1) safeguards against coordinated campaigns or foreign interference; (2) oversight of editors and administrators; (3) measures to prevent antisemitic, anti-Zionist, or anti-Israel bias; and (4) steps to increase transparency, including data on disputes, reversions, and administrator actions, and whether additional AI tools are being considered to enforce policies. Wasserman Schultz characterized the letter as bipartisan pressure on WMF to clarify and strengthen enforcement around Israel-related content. The ADL report referenced in the letter drew mixed reactions; some scholars and commentators questioned aspects of its methodology and conclusions.

== August 2025–present: House investigation of Wikipedia ==
On August 27, 2025, the House Committee on Oversight and Government Reform—through Chair James Comer (R–KY) and Subcommittee on Cybersecurity, Information Technology, and Government Innovation Chair Nancy Mace (R–SC)—announced an investigation into alleged organized efforts to manipulate Wikipedia entries in order to influence U.S. public opinion, citing concerns about foreign information operations and activity linked to U.S.-subsidized academic institutions. In a letter the same day to Maryana Iskander, CEO of the Wikimedia Foundation (WMF), the lawmakers wrote that "multiple studies and reports" indicated attempts to bias Wikipedia content—including alleged anti-Israel and pro-Kremlin campaigns—and asked for documents and data "as soon as possible but no later than September 10, 2025." The Committee's press release framed the inquiry in the context of Wikipedia's influence on readers and on AI chatbots. Press coverage described the move as a Republican-led probe into alleged bias, with some outlets emphasizing a focus on Israel-related articles and on pro-Kremlin editing networks.

=== Document requests and scope ===
The August 27 letter requested materials from January 1, 2023, to the present, including:

- “Records, communications, or analysis” on possible coordination by nation-state actors in Wikipedia editing;
- similar materials on coordination within academic institutions or other organized efforts that may violate Wikipedia policy;
- records of the English Wikipedia Arbitration Committee (ArbCom) covering editor-conduct disputes and actions;
- identifying and unique characteristics of accounts (e.g., names, IP addresses, registration dates, user activity logs) for editors subject to ArbCom actions;
- WMF editorial policies and protocols addressing neutrality, bias, and discipline; and
- any WMF or third-party analysis of patterns of manipulation or bias related to antisemitism and conflicts with the State of Israel.

The letter cited a March 2025 Anti-Defamation League (ADL) report alleging a coordinated campaign by ~30 editors to skew Israel-related content, and an April 2025 Atlantic Council Digital Forensic Research Lab investigation into pro-Kremlin efforts to "poison" AI models and rewrite Wikipedia. Independent reporting the prior month similarly documented tactics to seed LLM training data streams with disinformation via web content and Wikipedia edits.

=== Reactions ===
Media reports quoted WMF as acknowledging receipt of the Committee's letter and indicating it would review and respond; the Foundation reiterated general commitments to neutrality and content integrity. The request for account-level identifiers and logs drew attention to WMF's longstanding approach to nonpublic user data: WMF publishes biannual transparency reports and states it discloses nonpublic data only in response to legally valid requests, noting that it collects and retains relatively little nonpublic data about users.

Reactions spanned support and concern: Wikipedia co-founder Larry Sanger welcomed congressional scrutiny of alleged paid or state-backed editing, while some commentators highlighted potential chilling effects if editor anonymity were compromised (particularly in conflict-related topic areas).

=== Status ===
As of August 28, 2025, the Oversight Committee's request set a production deadline of September 10, 2025; public hearings or transcribed interviews specific to Wikipedia had not been announced in committee releases, and WMF's formal response had not yet been published.

== See also ==
- Wikipedia and the Israeli–Palestinian conflict
