= Antisemitism on Wikipedia =

Scholars and commentators have found antisemitism on Wikipedia related to user conduct, perceived anti-Jewish bias, and differences in framing or interpreting events related to the Holocaust. Criticism has referred to both the English Wikipedia and Wikipedias in other languages.

Wikipedia has dealt with antisemitic misconduct from its early days, with bias often reported and often penalized. In some cases, antisemitic bias resulted in additional oversight or anti-vandalism measures. For instance, in 2021, the Wikimedia Foundation published the results of an internal investigation into antisemitism in Croatian and Serbian Wikipedia articles from 2013 to 2021, which said that far-right activists had spread disinformation on the website, including Holocaust revisionism, and Wikipedia addressed that incident by banning the editors and administrators involved.

The World Jewish Congress accused Wikipedia of antisemitic bias in its coverage of Israel-related topics, particularly following the October 7th attacks in 2023.

In 2024, the English Wikipedia was criticized for deciding that the Anti-Defamation League (ADL), a non-governmental organization founded to address antisemitism and prejudice, was a "generally unreliable" source on the Israeli–Palestinian conflict (see § Reliability of the Anti-Defamation League). In 2025, the ADL published a report claiming to have found evidence that a group of at least 30 editors "circumvent Wikipedia's policies to introduce antisemitic narratives, anti-Israel bias, and misleading information."

Critics have also alleged that articles related to the Holocaust display national bias (especially in non-English Wikipedias), which may be antisemitic, and that their discussion pages include antisemitic comments.

== Antisemitic misconduct ==
In the early years of Wikipedia, there were isolated cases of antisemitic misconduct by Wikipedia contributors, as well as one larger-scale incident. In his book on Wikipedia culture, academic Joseph Reagle notes, for example, that a Wikipedian was blocked in 2005 for posting a list of purported Jewish editors.

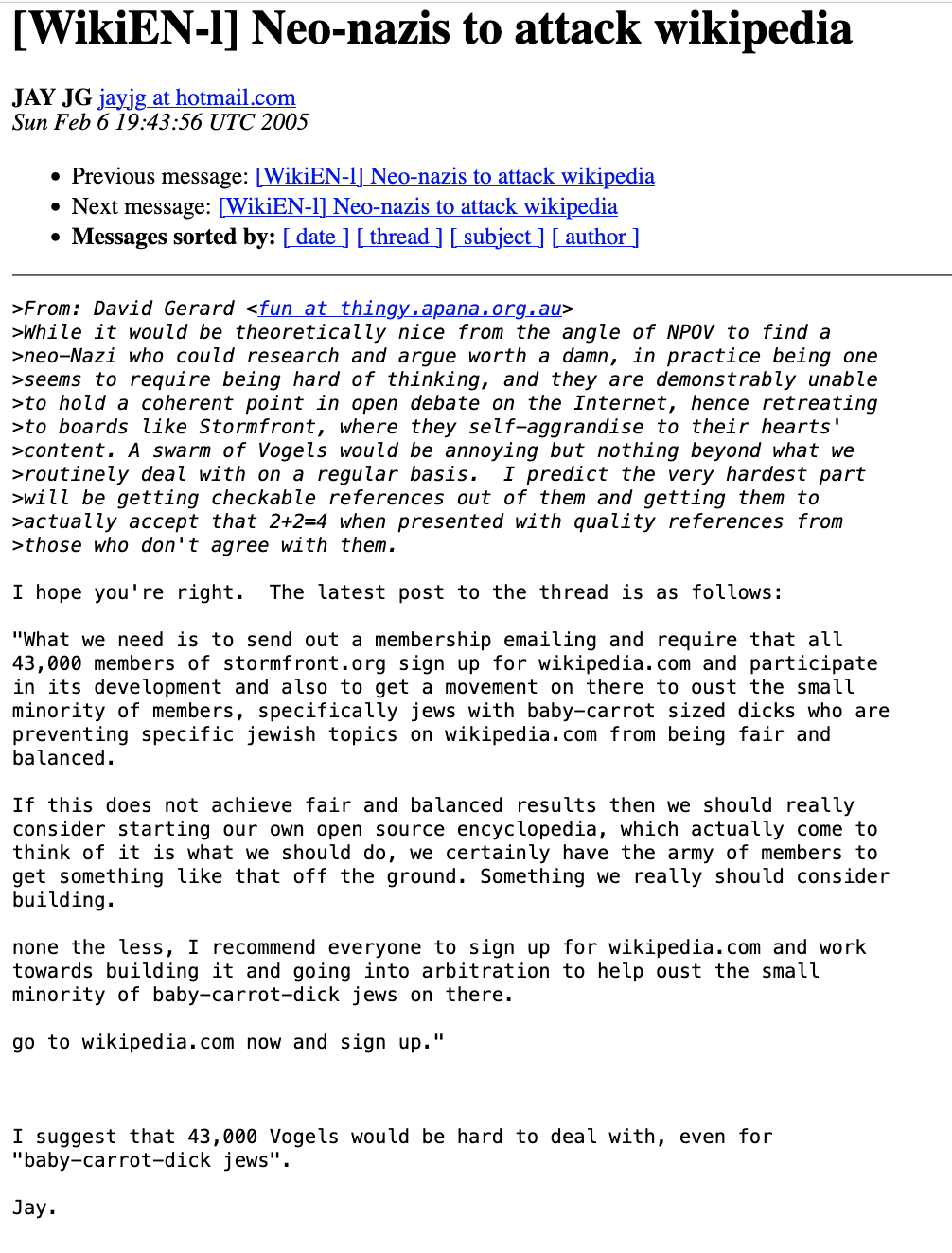
Neo-Nazis discussed their plan to intervene in Jewish topics on Wikipedia, quoted in a Wikipedia-EN list, February 7, 2005.

In his "Nazis and Norms" chapter, Reagle highlights a broader 2005 episode when neo-Nazis apparently mobilized to preserve an article on "Jewish ethnocentrism". According to Reagle, neo-Nazis and other Wikipedians were polite in their discussions, in keeping with Wikipedia etiquette and in keeping with the neo-Nazi guidance to avoid offending Wikipedians with anti-Jewish criticism. Nonetheless, Wikipedia co-founder Jimmy Wales stated that he would set aside ordinary procedures, protect the encyclopedia, and ban users as needed "if 300 neo-Nazis show up and start doing serious damage."

Other misconduct has included antisemitic vandalism on Wikipedia pages and the creation of accounts with antisemitic names, the creative nature of which obscures their identification. Wikipedia has responded, for example, banning a user for their anti-Jewish campaign. Antisemitic vandalism on Wikipedia pages typically result in quick reversals by site editors.

Some scholars have suggested that Wikipedia's collaborative editing policy makes the encyclopaedia vulnerable to antisemitic edits and vandalism. Once these edits have been made, editors resolve the issue by following the processes for article deletion and editing, which can lead to content disputes and edit warring. In other cases, references to the antisemitic views of notable individuals, such as Father Charles Coughlin, were deleted and then restored. Following such disruptions, Wikipedia may periodically restrict editing on its otherwise open platform.

According to Chip Berlet of Political Research Associates, Wikipedia has repeatedly overcome efforts to insert the antisemitic conspiracy theory that Jews were responsible for the September 11 attacks into various pages. He says such edits are removed "promptly" but require "constant attention" from editors.

The U.S. House Committee on Oversight and Government Reform, led by US representatives James Comer and Nancy Mace, began investigating whether, as alleged by the ADL, Wikipedia editors have made "systematic efforts to advance antisemitic and anti-Israel information."

Following Egypt's loss to Argentina during the 2026 FIFA World Cup, edits to referee François Letexier's Wikipedia biography falsely claiming he was Jewish were widely shared online, fueling antisemitic conspiracy theories before it was removed and the responsible editor was banned. Similarly, after the death of singer Dolly Parton, her Wikipedia article was vandalized by replacing her picture with a swastika and calling her a "Jew lover".

== Biased content ==
In a 2010 Journal of Information Technology & Politics article, it was that suggested anti-Jewish bias on Wikipedia can take the form of "criticism elimination", such as the removal of an accusation that the NGO War on Want had employed "Holocaust and anti-Semitic themes". In 2018, journalist Yair Rosenberg said that "activist" editors were "quietly attempting to erase" mention of antisemitism within the Labour Party by either seeking to delete the article on antisemitism in the British Labour Party or by adding the word "allegations" to the article's title. Rosenberg also criticised Wikipedia because, at that time, the Jeremy Corbyn article did not include criticisms of antisemitism; three months later, such criticisms had been added as their own section on the Wikipedia article.

=== Non-English Wikipedia ===
In writing about Arabic-language treatment of The Protocols of the Elders of Zion in 2013, scholar Carmen Matussek said that Arabic Wikipedia suggested this was a legitimate historical viewpoint rather than antisemitic black propaganda. Writer and academic Agnieszka Graff has suggested that articles about popular individuals with antisemitic viewpoints were edited with a respectful tone. Journalist Ohad Merlin said in 2024 that Arabic Wikipedia contained "outright antisemitism".

In March 2026, the World Jewish Congress published a report alleging systemic bias in Arabic Wikipedia's coverage of the Arab–Israeli conflict. The document stated that 25–50% of citations in related articles were drawn from sources linked to groups such as Hamas and Hezbollah, and criticized the use of phrases like "resistance factions" and "martyrdom operations". It also alleged that some senior administrators rejected Wikipedia's neutrality principle as a "Western concept" and blocked or banned editors who attempted to introduce neutral language.

Historian Shira Klein, comparing coverage of the Gaza war on English and Hebrew Wikipedia in 2024, said that "where the distortions lie, are in the Hebrew Wikipedia."

== Holocaust-related bias ==
In 2015, history professor Eva Pfanzelter published qualitative data analysis that found "racist, anti-Semitic, revisionist or denialist remarks" in 9 of the top 60 threads about The Holocaust article. For example, some Wikipedians argued that Jews should not be allowed to edit the article and that research sources should be rejected if written by Jews. Another 7 threads alleged bias by other editors. Wikipedia editors responded by deleting various edits and blocking some editors. Pfanzelter stated that the discussions were "rarely neutral" and that "serious scholars would dismiss" its Good Article peer review, which had argued that the wording, such as murder and genocide, "betrays a bias towards the belief that the Holocaust was a bad thing".

Several studies have examined the concept of "memory wars"—a political dispute over the interpretation or memorialization of a historical event—in Wikipedia articles relating to the Holocaust. Scholar Mykola Makhortykh has suggested that writing articles on Wikipedia is a "discursive construction of the past", in which articles become a way to commemorate, memorialize or otherwise understand the past, and this may explain why editors are drawn to engage in such memory wars over important topics like the Holocaust.

In 2016, Wolniewicz-Slomka analyzed the framing of 2014 articles about the Holocaust in the English, Hebrew, and Polish Wikipedias, hypothesizing that memory wars would result in different national narratives in each version. In his analysis, he said that the articles were "descriptive, and with very little evaluation or appeal to emotions". In the Auschwitz-Birkenau article, in particular, he identified some instances of bias that favoured the culture of the target audience, but this was true for both Polish and Hebrew versions of the article; the English version had a combination of these biases, suggesting Polish- and Hebrew-language editors had also been involved in writing the English version. (Note: For example, Wolniewicz-Slomka said "the articles in Polish and Hebrew present almost solely cases of heroism performed by members of their own respective nations", and said that the "occasional choices of vocabulary (such as the interchangeability between the words 'Jews' and 'victims' in the Hebrew version) reminds us that the articles are written in a certain cultural context".) By contrast, the articles on the 1941 Jedwabne pogrom uniformly identified Poles as the perpetrators, but the Polish version also said that the Poles had strong antisemitic feelings. He concluded that "the main characteristic of the articles" was "their attempt to remain academic and scientific", while "judgmental or evaluative language" was rarely used.

Relying partly on the Wolniewicz-Slomka methodology, Makhortykh compared editor interpretations of the Babi Yar article in the English, Russian, and Ukrainian Wikipedias. According to Makhortykh, the differences were evident in that "both the Russian and Ukrainian articles interpret it in a fundamentally different way from the English Wikipedia". The English-language article presents Babi Yar as "a Holocaust site and focuses on the history of the [Nazi] massacres", whereas the Russian and Ukrainian articles also focused on the 1961 Kurenivka mudslide and "present it as a generalised site of suffering, and place significant emphasis on its commemoration". Makhortykh says:

Digital media—such as Wikipedia—not only serve as spaces for cultural and political self-expression, but are also often used for the process of establishing collective identities through selective interpretations of the past and the present. Often, these interpretations are determined by existing cultural practices, which, as in the case of Babi Yar, leads to the instrumentalisation (e.g. by framing Ukrainians as Holocaust perpetrators in the Russian Wikipedia) or disparagement (e.g. by putting emphasis on non-Jewish victims in the Ukrain-ian Wikipedia) of Holocaust memory.

Like Wolniewicz-Slomka, Makhortykh also found a "large number of similarities in frame distributions across all three Wikipedia versions", which he suggests "points to the influence of platform-specific norms on the way issues are framed". He concluded that "the platform's encyclopaedic approach ... strives to avoid moral evaluations" and that the "existence of policies and norms supporting this approach" also "prevents the use of Wikipedia for the propagation of views of Holocaust deniers or highly subjective interpretations of the past in general".

In a similar analysis of the 1941 Lviv pogroms, Makhortykh reported that the Russian Wikipedia, unlike articles in seven other languages, focused on "framing the event as a single episode of the Holocaust" and stressing "the participation of Ukrainian nationalists in the pogrom". Makhortykh suggests these differences could serve to both "emphasize the connection between anti-Soviet nationalistic movements and crimes against humanity" and to "appropriate and marginalize memory of the Holocaust in Russia".

In an internal investigation looking at Croatian and Serbian Wikipedia articles from 2013 to 2021, the Wikipedia Foundation found disinformation had been spread by far-right activists on the website, including Holocaust revisionism and downplaying the atrocities of the Ustaše regime, such as the killings of Serbs, Roma, anti-fascists, and Jews at the Jasenovac concentration camp. Wikipedia published its "Croatian Wikipedia Disinformation Assessment", which described the case and the banning of the editors involved.

In 2023, historians Jan Grabowski and Shira Klein wrote that a small group of Wikipedia editors had intentionally introduced skewed views and distortions in the encyclopedia's history of the Holocaust. There was "significant cleanup of articles" in response to the study and the English Wikipedia's Arbitration Committee opened a case to investigate and evaluate the actions of editors in the affected articles. Ultimately, the Committee banned two editors from the topic areas. Piotr Konieczny, a Wikipedian who was named in the article, published a letter in the journal Holocaust Studies in 2025, disputing the methodology and conclusions of the study.

== Reliability of the Anti-Defamation League ==
Wikipedia maintains a list of "perennial sources" whose reliability has been evaluated by a community of editors. Possible statuses include "generally reliable", "marginally reliable... depending on context", "generally unreliable", and "deprecated".

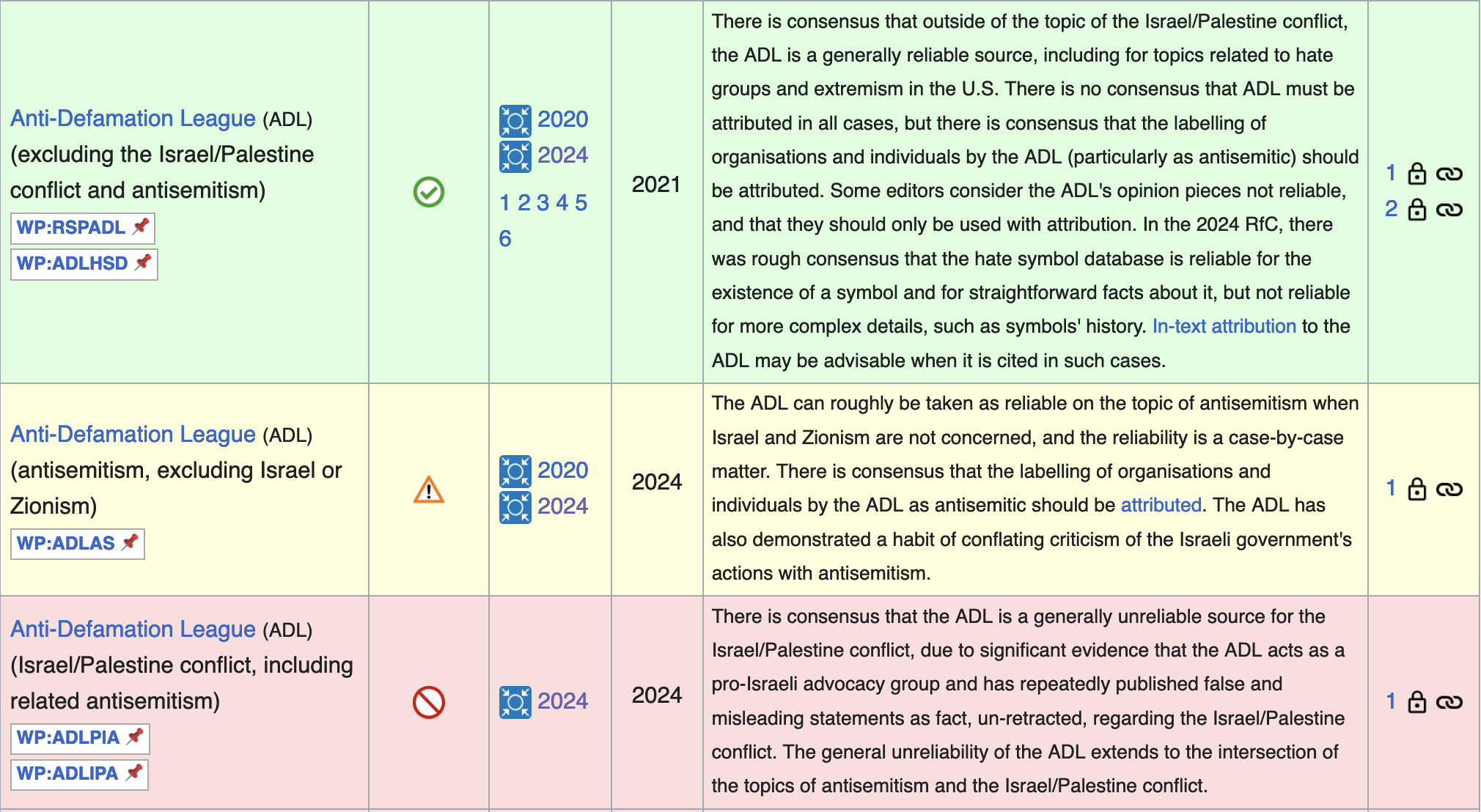
Wikipedia policy on the ADL as a reliable source, June 21, 2024

In June 2024, the Anti-Defamation League (ADL) was downgraded by the community to "generally unreliable" on the Israeli–Palestinian conflict. Editors supporting the decision said that the ADL had undermined its credibility by conflating criticism of Israel with antisemitism, by using an overly-broad classification of antisemitic incidents which included pro-Palestinian protests (based on the IHRA definition of antisemitism), and because of controversial statements by its CEO Jonathan Greenblatt, which included comparing the Palestinian keffiyeh to the Nazi swastika. The final decision said that there was "significant evidence that the ADL acts as a pro-Israeli advocacy group and has repeatedly published false and misleading statements as fact". The ADL's status was downgraded in "the intersection of the topics of antisemitism and the Israel/Palestine conflict, such as labeling pro-Palestinian activists as antisemitic". On antisemitism in general, the Wikipedia community stated that the ADL "can roughly be taken as reliable on the topic of antisemitism when Israel and Zionism are not concerned."

A number of Jewish groups wrote a joint letter to the Wikimedia Foundation, asking them to reverse the ADL decision because it "could provide cover for antisemitism" and was "stripping the Jewish community of the right to defend itself from the hatred that targets our community". The Foundation replied that it does not involve itself in such decisions, which are made by a community of volunteer editors. Deborah Lipstadt, the U.S. envoy on antisemitism, also raised concerns about Wikipedia's action on the ADL.

Many experts also disagreed with the ADL. Historian James Loeffler attributed the decision to ADL leadership "blurring the distinction between anti-Zionism and antisemitism". In an opinion piece in The Forward, Shira Klein expressed disappointment with the ADL's "manipulation of a peer-reviewed publication that [she] co-authored on Holocaust distortion on Wikipedia" and attributed the downgrade decision to the ADL's "overreach in interpretation of the facts" regarding Israel. She said that she hoped the Wikimedia Foundation "holds its ground" in response to pressure. In a separate piece, also in The Forward, opinion columnist Rob Eshman said the negative reaction to the decision was not justified and that advocacy for Israel was not compatible with doing important research.

== See also ==
- Criticism of Wikipedia
- Wikipedia and the Israeli–Palestinian conflict
- Ideological bias on Wikipedia
