= Arbitration committee =

Arbitration committee, arbitration commission or arbitration council may refer to:

- Arbitral tribunal, a panel of impartial adjudicators convened to resolve a dispute by way of arbitration
- Arbitration Committee (Wikimedia), an arbitration tribunal used on Wikimedia projects such as Wikipedia
