= IWR =

IWR may be:

- Interactive Web Response, similar to Interactive Voice Response (IVR)
- Intelligent word recognition
- Iraq Resolution or Iraq War Resolution, enacted by the United States in 2002
- Information World Review, an information industry trade newspaper
- iShares Russell Midcap (ticker symbol IWR), an exchange-traded fund of U.S. stocks
- Institute for Water Resources, part of the United States Army Corps of Engineers
- Isle of Wight Railway
- In-water recompression, a treatment for decompression sickness
- Independent Wrestling Revolution, a company that promotes professional wrestling
- The Interdisciplinary Center for Scientific Computing (in German: Interdisziplinäres Zentrum für wissenschaftliches Rechnen, short IWR), a scientific research institute of the University of Heidelberg, Germany.
