= Ideological bias on Wikipedia =

Ideological bias on Wikipedia has been the subject of both academic analysis and public discussion.

The English Wikipedia has an internal policy which states that articles must be written from a neutral point of view, which has the goal of representing fairly, proportionately, and without bias, the significant points of view that have been verifiably published by reliable sources on a topic. Collectively, findings show that Wikipedia articles edited by large numbers of editors with opposing ideological views are at least as neutral as other similar sources, but articles with smaller edit volumes by fewer—or more ideologically homogeneous—contributors are more likely to reflect the editorial bias of those contributing.

== State of research ==
=== Articles related to American politics ===
A 2012 study by Shane Greenstein and Feng Zhu of the Harvard Business School examined a sample of 28,382 articles related to U.S. politics as of January 2011, measuring their degree of bias on a "slant index" based on a method developed by Matthew Gentzkow and Jesse M. Shapiro in 2010, to measure bias in newspaper media. This slant index purports to measure an ideological lean toward either the Democratic or Republican parties, based on key phrases within the text such as "war in Iraq", "civil rights", "trade deficit", "economic growth", "illegal immigration" and "border security". Each phrase is assigned a slant index based on how often it is used by Democratic or Republican members of U.S. Congress. This lean rating is assigned to a Wikipedia contribution that includes the same key phrase. The authors concluded that older Wikipedia articles were mostly biased to the left, although recent articles are more neutral. They suggest that articles did not change their bias significantly due to revision, but rather that over time newer articles with contrasting viewpoints played a role in rebalancing the average perspectives among the entries.

In a subsequent 2014 study, the same researchers compared about 4,000 Wikipedia articles related to U.S. politics with the corresponding articles in Encyclopædia Britannica using similar methods as their 2010 study to measure "slant" (Democratic vs. Republican) and to quantify the degree of bias. The studies found that Wikipedia articles with fewer revisions were more slanted towards Democratic views than are Britannica articles and had more overall levels of bias, particularly those focusing on civil rights, corporations, and government. Entries about immigration trended toward the Republican party.

A 2014 study conducted on ten different versions of Wikipedia revealed that disputes among editors on the subject of politics (including politicians, political parties, political movements, and ideologies) accounted for approximately 25% of disputes.

A 2015 study of English Wikipedia examined the removal of positive or negative information in biographies of U.S. senators, though not in terms of ideological bias. The researchers introduced positive and negative content, sourced from reliable references, into the biographical entries of U.S. senators. Their findings revealed that negative content was more likely to be removed and were removed at a faster rate compared to positive content. The researchers concluded that a significant editorial bias exists in Wikipedia entries in favor of current U.S. senators of either major party. However, when a similar test was conducted on the Wikipedia pages of recently retired and deceased senators, the same discrepancy in the removal of positive and negative content was not observed. This suggests that the bias identified is specific to the pages of active politicians and does not indicate a systemic issue within Wikipedia. The authors concluded that information generated through collaborative projects such as Wikipedia may be susceptible to an editorial bias that favors politically active individuals.

In a 2017 report from Harvard's Berkman Klein Center for Internet & Society, Wikipedia was identified as a center-right website in the study's "candidate valence" scale, which used the political orientation of X users who shared content from the website as a measure of the website's political lean throughout the 2016 U.S. elections. Wikipedia was one of only three websites identified as center-right by the report, the other two websites being RealClearPolitics and National Review.

A 2023 study compared articles on controversial topics across multiple community-managed wikis to test whether the policy orientation of a collaborative wiki project would produce a slant in the content, by selecting the crowd of contributors. The findings showed that the content of wikis with explicit ideological biases, such as RationalWiki and Conservapedia, is more unbalanced than that of wikis (such as Wikipedia) or encyclopedias (such as Encyclopædia Britannica) advocating neutrality. Wikipedia's content had no significantly bigger slant than that of Britannica, while both RationalWiki and Conservapedia were "more loaded with moral content".

A 2023 study from the American Political Science Review found that changes in interpretations of wiki policy and the departure of certain editors over time led Wikipedia to take firmer stances on contested issues, resulting in an increase in the site's perceived reliability and "producing a type of content that is distinctly anti-pseudoscience and anti-conspiracy theories, and which has the perception of a liberal bent in U.S. politics".

A 2024 paper published by the Manhattan Institute, a conservative think tank, concluded that Wikipedia articles tended to associate greater negative sentiment with public figures and organizations on the right than those on the left.

=== User collaboration ===
A 2012 study focusing on edit wars suggested that consensus can often be reached within a reasonable timeframe, even in controversial articles. The conflicts that tend to prolong these edit wars are driven by the influx of new users. Most edit wars were carried out by a small number of users frequently in conflicts, despite their low overall productivity. In these debates, resolution was often reached not based on the merits of the arguments but rather due to external intervention, exhaustion, or the numerical dominance of one group.

A study conducted in 2013 focused on users who had declared their support for either the U.S. Democratic or Republican parties. These users tended to contribute more frequently with voices aligning with their own political orientation. However, they were not inclined to avoid collaboration with political opponents or prefer working exclusively with allies. The authors proposed that the shared identity of being a Wikipedian might outweigh potentially divisive aspects of personal identity, such as political affiliation. This finding distinguishes Wikipedia from other social platforms, such as Twitter and blogs, where users often exhibit strong polarization by predominantly interacting with users who share similar political orientations. In contrast, Wikipedia can be characterized as a platform where users display a higher degree of interaction across political orientations, akin to forums and similar platforms.

A 2018 study found that a majority of editors on the French Wikipedia had a propensity to share equally in a dictator game. This was correlated with their involvement on Wikipedia (as measured by the time spent and attachment).

Drawing from experimental research findings, Holtz et al. (2018) proposed a model of knowledge production in Wikipedia, employing the concept of "productive friction". This posits that a certain level of interpretative conflict is necessary for the collective process to generate knowledge. The model draws an analogy to the socio-cognitive conflict model used in psychology to elucidate individual learning. According to this hypothesis, if the tensions or friction within a group are too low, the potential for knowledge construction is limited since the existing knowledge is deemed sufficient. Conversely, if the friction within a community of contributors becomes excessively high, it can lead to the dismissal of respective ideas or even the division of the group, similar to how an individual may struggle to adapt and learn when confronted with an overwhelming amount of novelty.

A 2019 study conducted among American users of the English version highlighted significant political orientation bias among users contributing to political topics, finding that the more edits made to an entry, the more balanced the political orientation of the contributing pool became. The study indicated that the quality of articles, as recognized by the Wikipedia community, improves as the diversity of political orientation among contributors increases. Politically polarized group members generally produced better articles compared to groups of highly aligned users or moderates. Positive effects of polarization were observed not only in articles related to politics but also in those concerning social issues and even science. Politically polarized groups engage in frequent disagreements, stimulating focused debates that result in higher quality, more robust, and comprehensive edits. However, these findings are subject to limitations. The contributors who participated may suffer a self-selection bias, which can influence outcomes.

== Media reporting ==
In 2016, Bloomberg News stated, "The encyclopedia's reliance on outside sources, primarily newspapers, means it will be only as diverse as the rest of the media—which is to say, not very." In a 2017 article featuring views on alternatives to Wikipedia, Wired magazine noted:

It's true that the reach and impact of right-wing encyclopedias like Infogalactic and Metapedia remains muted, for now. Yet their mere existence is a sign that the appeal of a centralized forum for hashing out the truth is fading. Wikipedia might find that its days at the top are numbered.

In 2018, Haaretz noted "Wikipedia has succeeded in being accused of being both too liberal and too conservative, and has critics from across the spectrum", while also noting that Wikipedia is "usually accused of being too liberal".

CNN suggested in 2022 that Wikipedia's ideological bias "may match the ideological bias of the news ecosystem". The Boston Globe opined, "A Wikipedia editor's interest in an article sprouts from their values and opinions, and their contributions are filtered through their general interpretation of reality. Edict or no, a neutral point of view is impossible. Not even a Wikipedia editor can transcend that." Slate, in a 2022 article, stated "Right-wing commentators have grumbled about [Wikipedia]'s purported left-wing bias for years, but they have been unable to offer a viable alternative encyclopedia option: A conservative version of Wikipedia, Conservapedia, has long floundered with minimal readership", while also noting that conservatives "have not generally attacked Wikipedia as extensively" as other media sources. Also in 2022, Vice News reported, "Researchers have found that Wikipedia has a slight Democratic bias on issues of U.S. politics because many of Wikipedia's editors are international, and the average country has views that are to the left of the Democratic party on issues such as healthcare, climate change, corporate power, capitalism, etc."

== Responses ==
=== Larry Sanger ===
Larry Sanger, co-founder of Wikipedia, has been critical of Wikipedia since he was laid off as the only editorial employee and departed from the project in 2002. He went on to found and work for competitors to Wikipedia, including Citizendium and Everipedia. Among other criticisms, Sanger has been vocal in his view that Wikipedia's articles present a left-wing and liberal or "establishment point of view". Sanger has cited a number of examples for what he views as left-wing and liberal bias, such as that "Drug legalisation, dubbed drug liberalisation by Wikipedia, has only a little information about any potential hazards of drug legalisation policies" and that the Wikipedia article on Joe Biden does not sufficiently reflect "the concerns that Republicans have had about him" or the Ukraine allegations. Because of these perceived biases, Sanger views Wikipedia as untrustworthy. He has also accused Wikipedia of abandoning its neutrality policy (neutral point of view).

A study published in 2023 analyzed the biases of Wikipedia's editors and how some changes at Wikipedia, including the tendency of "pro-fringe" editors to leave the project, have improved its credibility. These changes include improvements to the NPOV policy. They also noted that Sanger does not like those changes.

In 2021, Wikipedia denied accusations made by Larry Sanger of having a particular political bias, with a spokesperson for the encyclopedia saying that third-party studies have shown that its editors come from a variety of ideological viewpoints and that, "As more people engage in the editing process on Wikipedia, the more neutral articles tend to become."

=== Conservapedia ===
American lawyer and Christian conservative activist Andrew Schlafly founded an online encyclopedia named Conservapedia in 2006 to counter what he perceived as a liberal bias present in Wikipedia.

=== Jimmy Wales ===
In 2006, Wikipedia co-founder Jimmy Wales said:

The Wikipedia community is very diverse, from liberal to conservative to libertarian and beyond. If averages mattered, and due to the nature of the wiki software (no voting) they almost certainly don't, I would say that the Wikipedia community is slightly more liberal than the U.S. population on average, because we are global and the international community of English speakers is slightly more liberal than the U.S. population. There are no data or surveys to back that.

In 2007, Wales said that claims of liberal bias on Wikipedia "are not supported by the facts".

During the Gamergate controversy in 2014, in response to an email from a computer science student claiming that Wikipedia has a "complete lack of any sort of attempt at neutrality regarding Gamergate", Wales allegedly wrote, "It is very difficult for me to buy into the notion that gamergate is 'really about ethics in journalism' when every single experience I have personally had with it involved pro-gg people insulting, threatening, doxxing, etc.", and that the movement "has been permanently tarnished and highjacked [sic] by a handful of people who are not what you would hope". Wales defended his comments in response to backlash from supporters of Gamergate, saying that, "it isn't about what I believe. Gg is famous for harassment. Stop and think about why."

=== US government ===
In April 2025, acting US Attorney for the District of Columbia Ed Martin sent a letter to the Wikimedia Foundation accusing the organization of "allowing foreign actors to manipulate information and spread propaganda to the American public" and suggesting that it might be violating its requirements as a 501(c)(3) non-profit. The following month, Representative Debbie Wasserman Schultz and 22 other Congressmembers signed a letter to Wikimedia Foundation CEO Maryana Iskander expressing "deep concern regarding antisemitism, anti-Israel bias, and the potential abuse of Wikipedia by coordinated actors", citing a report by the Anti-Defamation League that purported to identify a "multiyear campaign by bad-faith editors to revise Wikipedia's content on Israel and the Israeli–Palestinian conflict". The Congressmembers requested information from the Wikimedia Foundation about how they prevent misinformation, foreign influence, and anti-Israel bias. In August 2025, a probe into alleged bias on Wikipedia was started by Republicans in the House Committee on Oversight and Government Reform. The representatives stated that this was part of an investigation into "foreign operations and individuals at academic institutions subsidized by U.S. taxpayer dollars to influence U.S. public opinion."

=== Elon Musk ===
In October 2025, Elon Musk launched Grokipedia, which he said would strip out the "woke" from Wikipedia. Journalist Richard Cooke, who authored a political biography of Musk, stated in remarks to The Guardian that "Grokipedia is a copy of Wikipedia but one where in each instance that Wikipedia disagrees with the richest man in the world, it's 'rectified' so that it's congruent with them".

== Controversies ==
=== Across Wikipedias in different languages ===
==== Arabic ====
Writing about the Arabic-language treatment of The Protocols of the Elders of Zion in 2013, scholar Carmen Matussek said that Arabic Wikipedia suggested this was a legitimate historical viewpoint rather than antisemitic propaganda. Journalist Ohad Merlin in 2024 claimed that "[d]isinformation, generalizations, and outright lies are allowed to go unchecked on the free encyclopedia's Arabic version."

==== Croatian ====
From 2011 to 2020, the user-generated editing model of Croatian Wikipedia was co-opted by far-right nationalists who falsified and promoted biased content on a variety of topics: fascism, Serbs of Croatia, as well as the Ustaše and LGBTQ community. These slanted edits included historical denialism, negating or diluting the severity of crimes, and far-right propaganda. This group of editors was banned by Wikipedia in 2021 and received negative reception from the Croatian government, media, and historians. The small size of the Croatian Wikipedia in 2013 (466 active editors of whom 27 were administrators) was cited as a major factor. That year, education minister Željko Jovanović advised students not to use Croatian Wikipedia; historians recommended using the English Wikipedia in the interim.

==== English ====
In February 2023, Jan Grabowski and Shira Klein published a research article in the Journal of Holocaust Research accusing a number of English Wikipedia editors of engaging in a campaign to "[promote] a skewed version of history on Wikipedia", claiming that their actions "[whitewash] the role of Polish society in the Holocaust and [bolster] stereotypes about Jews". The English Wikipedia's Arbitration Committee subsequently opened a case to investigate and evaluate the actions of editors in the affected articles. Ultimately, the Committee ruled to ban two editors from contributing to the topic areas. A response to Grabowski and Klein's article, which argues that their main conclusions are misleading or false, was published by Piotr Konieczny in the journal Holocaust Studies in 2025.

Christoph Hube and Anna Samoilenko have criticized Wikipedia, in particular the English Wikipedia, for its insufficient representation of non-Western subject matter, which Samoilenko has deemed "Eurocentric". Anna Samoilenko has said that Wikipedia "reiterates similar biases that are found in the 'ivory tower' of academic historiography".

==== Hebrew ====
In July 2023, the right-wing Israeli think tank Kohelet Policy Forum was criticized for allegedly using sock puppet accounts to influence articles related to the 2023 Israeli judicial reform on Hebrew Wikipedia.

==== Japanese ====
A number of scholars have criticized several Japanese Wikipedia articles for their description of various World War II events, including articles for the Nanjing Massacre, Unit 731, and comfort women.

==== Serbian ====
In 2024, the weekly magazine Vreme reported that Serbian Wikipedia includes content reflecting elements of Serbian nationalism and historical revisionism, particularly in articles related to the Yugoslav Wars. The report states that certain articles minimize or relativize Serbian war crimes and portray contentious historical figures (including war criminals) in a favorable light. Additionally, it described the use of passive language and editorial choices that obscure the accountability of domestic actors.

A 2025 investigation by the Radar magazine raised questions about Serbian Wikipedia's coverage of ongoing political events in Serbia, specifically the large-scale student-led anti‑corruption protests. According to the article, Serbian Wikipedia included language and framing aligned with pro‑Serbian Progressive Party narratives. For example, protests were described using terms such as "an attempt at a colour revolution", with vague attribution, and associations were made between protests and separatist movements in Serbia.

In March 2026, several right-wing and pro-Serbian Progressive Party administrators and users received global bans from the Wikimedia Foundation.

==== Spanish ====
In 2022, several cultural and political figures from Spain published a manifesto alleging a "lack of neutrality and ... obvious political bias in [the Spanish] Wikipedia" and claimed that the Spanish Wikipedia is "edited by people who, hiding behind anonymous editor accounts, take the opportunity to carry out political activism, either by including erroneous or false data, or selecting news from the media with a clear political and ideological bias, which refer to controversial, distorted, insidious or inaccurate information". The manifesto was signed by Juan Carlos Girauta, Álvaro Vargas Llosa, Lucía Etxebarría, Félix de Azúa, Francisco Sosa Wagner, Miriam Tey, Cayetana Álvarez de Toledo, Joaquín Leguina, Albert Rivera, Daniel Lacalle and Toni Cantó, among other personalities.

The Spanish Wikipedia has been criticized for offering a whitewashed coverage of the president of Argentina Cristina Kirchner.

In a July 2022 article, Claudia Peiró from Infobae criticized the Spanish Wikipedia's entry on Cuba for describing the country as a "democracy without parties" with a "free, direct and secret vote".

=== CAMERA campaign ===
In April 2008, The Electronic Intifada published an article containing e-mails exchanged by members of the Committee for Accuracy in Middle East Reporting in America (CAMERA). The stated purpose of the group was "help[ing] us keep Israel-related entries on Wikipedia from becoming tainted by anti-Israel editors". Five Wikipedia editors involved in a CAMERA campaign were sanctioned by Wikipedia administrators, who wrote that the project's open nature "is fundamentally incompatible with the creation of a private group to surreptitiously coordinate editing by ideologically like-minded individuals".

== See also ==
- Criticism of Wikipedia
- Geographical bias on Wikipedia
- Racial bias on Wikipedia
- Reliability of Wikipedia
- Wikipedia § Coverage of topics and systemic bias
- Wikipedia and the Israeli–Palestinian conflict
