= Conservapedia =

American conservative online encyclopedia

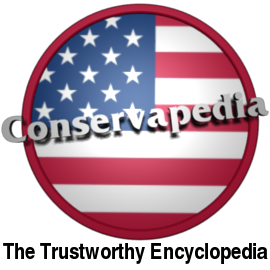

- Screenshot Homepage screenshot of the top portion on March 6, 2013
- Website type: Online encyclopedia; Wiki
- Available in: English
- Owner: Andrew Schlafly
- Creator: Volunteer contributors
- Website: conservapedia.com
- Commercial: No
- Registration: Optional (required to edit pages but via request of account)
- Launched: November 21, 2006; 20 years ago
- Current status: Active
- Content license: Unclear (see § Licensing of content)

Conservapedia (/kənˌsɜːrvəˈpiːdiə/; kən-SUR-və-PEE-di-ə) is an English-language, wiki-based, online encyclopedia written from a self-described American conservative and fundamentalist Christian point of view. The website was established in 2006 by American attorney and activist Andrew Schlafly, son of Phyllis Schlafly, to counter what he perceived as a liberal bias on Wikipedia. It uses editorials and a wiki-based system for content generation.

Examples of Conservapedia's ideology include its criticism of former US president Barack Obama—including advocacy of Barack Obama citizenship conspiracy theories—along with criticisms of atheism, feminism, homosexuality, the Democratic Party, and evolution. Conservapedia views Albert Einstein's theory of relativity as promoting moral relativism, claims that abortion increases risk of breast cancer, praises Republican politicians, supports celebrities and artistic works it believes represent moral standards in line with Christian family values, and espouses fundamentalist Christian doctrines such as Young Earth creationism. Conservapedia's "Conservative Bible Project" is a crowd-sourced retranslation of the English-language Bible which the site says to be "free of corruption by liberal untruths."

Conservapedia has received negative reactions from the mainstream media and political figures, and has been criticized by liberal and conservative critics alike for bias and inaccuracies.

As of October 2026, Conservapedia has more than 59,300 articles and 20 active registered users.

== Background ==
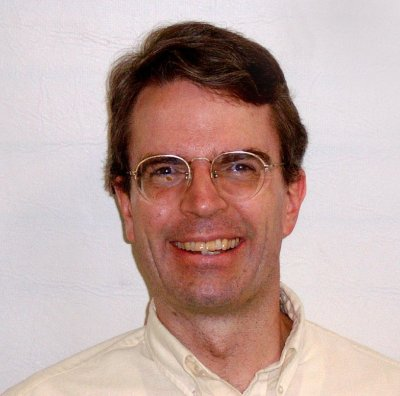
Conservapedia founder Andrew Schlafly in 2007

Conservapedia was created in November 2006 by Andrew Schlafly, a Harvard and Princeton-educated attorney. He established the project after reading a student's assignment written using the Common Era notation rather than Anno Domini. Interviewed by Shawn Zeller of Congressional Quarterly, Schlafly said he was "an early Wikipedia enthusiast", but became concerned about bias after other Wikipedia editors repeatedly reverted his edits to an article about the 2005 Kansas evolution hearings. Schlafly expressed the hope Conservapedia would become a general resource for American educators and a counterpoint to the liberal bias that he perceived in Wikipedia.

The "Eagle Forum University" online education program, which is associated with Phyllis Schlafly's Eagle Forum organization, uses material for online courses, including U.S. history, stored on Conservapedia. Editing of Conservapedia articles related to a particular course topic is also a certain assignment for Eagle Forum University students.

Running on MediaWiki software, the site was founded in 2006, with its earliest articles dating from November 22. By January 2012, Conservapedia contained over 38,000 pages, not counting pages intended for internal discussion and collaboration, minimal "stub" articles, and other miscellany. Regular features on the front page of Conservapedia include links to news articles and blogs that the site's editors consider relevant to conservatism. Editors of Conservapedia also maintain a page titled "Examples of Bias in Wikipedia" that compiles alleged instances of bias or errors on Wikipedia pages. It was, at one point, the most-viewed page on the site.

== Editorial viewpoints and policies ==
Conservapedia has editorial policies designed to prevent vandalism and what Schlafly sees as liberal bias. However, although the site's operators claim that the site "strives to keep its articles concise, informative, family-friendly, and true to the facts, which often back up conservative ideas more than liberal ones", according to The Australian, "arguments are often circular", and "contradictions, self-serving rationalizations and hypocrisies abound."

=== Comparison to Wikipedia ===
Shortly after its launch in 2006, Schlafly described the site as being competition for Wikipedia, saying "Wikipedia has gone the way of CBS News. It's long overdue to have competition like Fox News." Many editorial practices of Conservapedia differ from those of Wikipedia. Articles and other content on the site frequently include criticism of Wikipedia as well as criticism of its alleged liberal ideology and moderation policies.

The site's "Conservapedia Commandments" differ from Wikipedia's editorial policies, which include following a neutral point of view and avoiding original research. In response to Wikipedia's core policy of neutrality, Schlafly has stated: "It's impossible for an encyclopedia to be neutral. I mean let's take a point of view, let's disclose that point of view to the reader," and "Wikipedia does not poll the views of its editors and administrators. They make no effort to retain balance. It ends up having all the neutrality of a lynch mob."

In a March 2007 interview with The Guardian, Schlafly stated: "I've tried editing Wikipedia, and found it and the biased editors who dominate it censor or change facts to suit their views. In one case my factual edits were removed within 60 seconds—so editing Wikipedia is no longer a viable approach." On March 7, 2007, Schlafly was interviewed on BBC Radio 4's morning show, Today, opposite Wikipedia administrator Jim Redmond. Schlafly argued that the article on the Renaissance does not give sufficient credit to Christianity, that Wikipedia articles apparently prefer to use non-American spellings even though most users are American, that the article on American activities in the Philippines has a distinctly anti-American bias, and that attempts to include pro-Christian or pro-American views are removed very quickly. Schlafly also claimed that Wikipedia's allowance of both Common Era and Anno Domini notation was anti-Christian bias.

=== Licensing of content ===
Conservapedia allows users to "use any of the content on this site with or without attribution." The copyright policy also states: "This license is revocable only in very rare instances of self-defense, such as protecting continued use by Conservapedia editors or other licensees." It also does not permit "unauthorized mirroring." Wikipedia co-founder Jimmy Wales has raised concerns about the fact that the project is not licensed under the GNU Free Documentation License (GFDL) or a similar copyleft license, stating that "[p]eople who contribute [to Conservapedia] are giving them full control of the content, which may lead to unpleasant results."

=== Vandalism ===
The site has stated that it prohibits unregistered users from editing entries due to concerns over vandalism, disruption or defamation. Brian Macdonald, a Conservapedia editor, commented that vandalism was intended to "cause people to say, 'That Conservapedia is just wacko.'" According to Stephanie Simon of the Los Angeles Times, Macdonald spent many hours every day reverting "malicious editing." Vandals had inserted "errors, pornographic photos and satire." For example, U.S. Attorney General Alberto R. Gonzales was said to be "a strong supporter of torture as a law enforcement tool for use against Democrats and third world inhabitants."

=== Other editorial policies ===
Conservapedia states on its "Manual of Style" page that "American English spellings are preferred but Commonwealth spellings, for de novo or otherwise well-maintained articles are welcome." It prefers that articles about the United Kingdom use British English, while articles about the United States use American English, to resolve editorial disputes. Initially, Schlafly and other Conservapedia editors considered Wikipedia's policy allowing British English spelling to be anti-American bias.

The "Conservapedia Commandments" require edits to be "family-friendly, clean, concise, and without gossip or foul language" and that users make mostly quality edits to articles. Accounts that engage in what the site considers "unproductive activity, such as 90% talk and only 10% quality edits" may be blocked. The commandments also cite United States Code 18 USC § 1470 as justification for legal action against obscene, vandalism or spam edits. Because of Schlafly's claim that Wikipedia's allowance of both Common Era and Anno Domini notation is anti-Christian bias, the commandments disallow use of the former.

=== Conspiracy theories ===
Conservapedia promotes various conspiracy theories, such as the claim that the January 6 United States Capitol attack was staged by Antifa, that the 2020 United States presidential election was stolen from Donald Trump, and that Michelle Obama is secretly transgender. In addition, it supports the conspiracy theory that Barack Obama's published birth certificate was a forgery and that he was born in Kenya, not Hawaii, as well as the conspiracy theory that he secretly practices Islam, not Protestant Christianity.

It also describes Albert Einstein's theory of relativity as part of an ideological plot by liberals. Andy Schlafly claims that "virtually no one who is taught and believes relativity continues to read the Bible", and according to the Arizona Jewish Post, "cites passages in the Christian Bible in an effort to disprove Einstein's theories." They described this argument as "conflat[ing] relativity, a theory in physics about time, space and gravity, with relativism, a philosophical argument about morality and human experience having nothing to do with physics."

== Conflicts with scientific views ==
Various Conservapedia articles contradict established science. The Royal Society said of the website that "People need to be very careful about where they look for scientific information." Conservapedia's critics voiced concern that children stumbling on the site may assume Conservapedia's scientific content is accurate. In 2011, skeptic Brian Dunning listed it as #9 on his "Top 10 Worst Anti-Science Websites" list.

=== Creationism ===
Conservapedia promotes young Earth creationism, a pseudoscientific view that the Earth was created in 6 literal days approximately 6,000 years ago. Although not all Conservapedia contributors subscribe to a young-Earth creationist point of view, with the administrator Terry "TK" Koeckritz stating to the Los Angeles Times that he did not take the Genesis creation account literally, sources have attributed the poor science coverage to an overall editorial support of the young-Earth creationist perspective and an over-reliance on Christian creationist home-schooling textbooks. In an analysis in early 2007, science writer Carl Zimmer found evidence that much of what appeared to be inaccurate or inadequate information about science and scientific theory could be traced back to an over-reliance on citations from the works of home-schooling textbook author Jay L. Wile.

=== Evolution ===
Conservapedia's article on evolution presents it as a naturalistic theory that lacks support and that conflicts with evidence in the fossil record that creationists perceive to support creationism. The entry also suggests that sometimes (a literal reading of) the Bible has been more scientifically correct than the scientific community. Schlafly has defended the statement as presenting an alternative to evolution.

=== Environmentalism ===
Conservapedia formerly described global warming as a "liberal hoax."

Conservapedia included an entry on the Pacific Northwest Arboreal Octopus, a 1998 internet hoax, with some readers being left unsure whether Conservapedia was being serious about the creature's existence. Schlafly asserted that the article was intended as a parody of environmentalism. By March 4, 2007, the entry had been deleted.

=== Abortion ===
Conservapedia asserts that induced abortion increases the risk of breast cancer, while the scientific consensus is that there is no such association.

=== Relativity ===
Conservapedia has also been criticized for its articles regarding the theory of relativity, particularly on their entry titled "Counterexamples to relativity" which lists examples purportedly demonstrating that the theory is incorrect. Attention was drawn to the article by a Talking Points Memo posting that reported on Conservapedia's entry and stated that Schlafly "has found one more liberal plot: the theory of relativity." New Scientist, a science magazine, criticized Conservapedia's views on relativity and responded to several of Conservapedia's arguments against it. Against Conservapedia's statements, New Scientist stated that, while one is unlikely to find a single physicist who would claim that the theory of general relativity is the whole answer to how the universe works, the theory has passed every test to which it has been subjected.

University of Maryland physics professor Robert L. Park has also criticized Conservapedia's entry on the theory of relativity, arguing that its criticism of the principle as "heavily promoted by liberals who like its encouragement of relativism and its tendency to mislead people in how they view the world" confuses a physical theory with a moral value. Similarly, New Scientist stated at the end of their article:

In the end there is no liberal conspiracy at work. Unfortunately, humanities scholars often confuse the issue by misusing the term "relativity." The theory in no way encourages relativism, regardless of what Conservapedia may think. The theory of relativity is ultimately not so much about what it renders relative—three-dimensional space and one-dimensional time—but about what it renders absolute: the speed of light and four-dimensional space-time.

In October 2010, Scientific American criticized Conservapedia's attitude towards the theory of relativity, assigning them a zero score on their 0 to 100 fallacy-versus-fact "Science Index", describing Conservapedia as "the online encyclopedia run by conservative lawyer Andrew Schlafly, [which] implies that Einstein's theory of relativity is part of a liberal plot."

Another Conservapedia claim is that "Albert Einstein's work had nothing to do with the development of the atomic bomb", and that relativity had no practical applications.

== Ideology ==
The Guardian has referred to Conservapedia's politics as "right-wing", although it is sometimes described as far-right or New Right. Journalist Leonard Pitts quoted it in a critical comment saying "You may judge Conservapedia's own bias by reading its definition of liberal."

=== Partisan politics ===
Schlafly said in an interview with National Public Radio that Wikipedia's article on the history of the Democratic Party is an "attempt to legitimize the modern Democratic Party by going back to Thomas Jefferson" and that this statement is "specious and worth criticizing." He also has claimed that Wikipedia is "six times more liberal than the American public", a claim that has been labeled "sensational" by Andrew Chung of the Toronto Star.

In 2007, John Cotey of the St. Petersburg Times observed that the Conservapedia article about the Democratic Party contained a criticism about the party's alleged support for same-sex marriage, and associated the party with the supposed homosexual agenda.

The Conservapedia entries on former Secretary of State Hillary Clinton and President Barack Obama are critical of their respective subjects. During the 2008 presidential campaign, its entry on Obama asserted that he "has no clear personal achievement that cannot be explained as the likely result of affirmative action." Some Conservapedia editors urged that the statement be changed or deleted, but Schlafly, a former classmate of Obama, responded by asserting that the Harvard Law Review, the Harvard University legal journal for which Obama and Schlafly worked together, uses racial quotas and stated, "The statement about affirmative action is accurate and will remain in the entry." In addition, Hugh Muir of The Guardian mockingly referred to Conservapedia's assertion that Obama has links to radical Islam as "dynamite" and an excellent resource for "US rightwingers."

In contrast, the articles about conservative politicians, such as former U.S. Republican president Ronald Reagan and former British Conservative Prime Minister Margaret Thatcher, have been observed as praising their respective subjects. Mark Sabbatini of the Juneau Empire described the Conservapedia entry on Sarah Palin, the Republican vice-presidential candidate for the 2008 U.S. presidential election, as having been written largely by people friendly to its subject and avoiding controversial topics.

=== Atheism ===
The website sometimes adopts a strongly critical stance against figures whom it perceives as political, religious, or ideological opponents, often with an emphasis on atheists. For instance, in May 2009, Vanity Fair and The Spectator reported that Conservapedia's article on atheist Richard Dawkins featured a picture of Adolf Hitler at the top. The picture was later moved to a lower position in the article.

== Reception ==
The Conservapedia project has come under significant criticism for numerous factual inaccuracies and factual relativism. Wired magazine observed that Conservapedia was "attracting lots of derisive comments on blogs and a growing number of phony articles written by mischief makers". Iain Thomson in Information World Review wrote that "leftist subversives" may have been creating deliberate parody entries. Conservapedia has been compared to CreationWiki, a wiki written from a creationist perspective, and Theopedia, a wiki with a Reformed theology focus. In 2007, Fox News obliquely compared it with other new conservative websites competing with mainstream ones at the time, such as MyChurch, a Christian version of the then-popular social networking site Myspace, and Godtube, a Christian version of video site YouTube.

Tom Flanagan, a conservative professor of political science at the University of Calgary, has argued that Conservapedia is more about religion, specifically Christianity, than political or social conservatism and that it "is far more guilty of the crime they're attributing to Wikipedia" than Wikipedia itself. Matt Millham of the military-oriented newspaper Stars and Stripes called Conservapedia "a Web site that caters mostly to evangelical Christians". Its scope as an encyclopedia, according to its founders, "offers a historical record from a Christian and conservative perspective". APC magazine perceives this to be representative of Conservapedia's own problem with bias. Conservative Christian commentator Rod Dreher has been highly critical of the website's "Conservative Bible Project", an ongoing retranslation of the Bible which Dreher attributes to "insane hubris" on the part of "right-wing ideologues".

The project has also been criticized for presenting a false dichotomy between conservatism and liberalism, as well as between Christian fundamentalism and atheism, and for promoting relativism with the implicit idea that there "often are two equally valid interpretations of the facts". Matthew Sheffield, writing in the conservative daily newspaper The Washington Times, argued that conservatives concerned about bias should contribute more often to Wikipedia rather than use Conservapedia as an alternative since he felt that alternative websites like Conservapedia are often "incomplete". Author Damian Thompson asserts that the purpose of Conservapedia is to "dress up nonsense as science".

Bryan Ochalla, writing for the LGBTQ magazine The Advocate, referred to the project as "Wikipedia for the bigoted". On the satirical news program The Daily Show, comedian Lewis Black lampooned its article on homosexuality. Writing in The Australian, columnist Emma Jane described Conservapedia as "a disturbing parallel universe where the ice age is a theoretical period, intelligent design is empirically testable, and relativity and geology are junk sciences".

Opinions criticizing the site rapidly spread throughout the blogosphere around early 2007. Schlafly appeared on radio programs Today on BBC Radio 4 and All Things Considered on NPR to discuss the site around that time. In May 2008, Schlafly and one of his homeschooled students appeared on the CBC program The Hour for the same purpose.

Stephanie Simon of the Los Angeles Times quoted two Conservapedia editors who commented favorably about Conservapedia. Matt Barber, policy director for the conservative Christian political action group Concerned Women for America, praised Conservapedia as a more family-friendly and "accurate" alternative to Wikipedia.

Wired magazine, in an article entitled "Ten Impressive, Weird And Amazing Facts About Wikipedia", highlighted several of Conservapedia's articles, including those on "Atheism and obesity" and "Hollywood values", amongst others. It also highlighted Conservapedia's "Examples of bias in Wikipedia" article, which encourages readers to contact Jimmy Wales and tell him to "sort it out".

Conservapedia's use of Wikipedia's format to create a conservative Christian alternative encyclopedia has been mirrored by other sites, such as Godtube, QubeTV and MyChurch, which adopted the format of the more prominent YouTube and Myspace, respectively.

Wikipedia's co-creator Jimmy Wales said about Conservapedia that "free culture knows no bounds" and "the reuse of our work to build variants [is] directly in line with our mission". Wales denied Schlafly's claims of liberal bias in Wikipedia.

In 2022, Slate noted that Conservapedia "has long floundered with minimal readership".

=== RationalWiki ===
RationalWiki is another wiki, created in 2007 as a counterpoint to Conservapedia, after an incident in which some editors of Conservapedia were banned. In April 2007, Peter Lipson, a doctor of internal medicine, attempted to edit Conservapedia's article on breast cancer to include evidence against Conservapedia's pseudoscientific claim that abortion increases risk of developing it. Schlafly and Conservapedia administrators "questioned [Lipson's] credentials and shut down debate". After they were blocked, "Lipson and several other contributors quit trying to moderate the articles (on Conservapedia) and instead started their own website, RationalWiki". An article published in the Los Angeles Times in 2007 alleged that RationalWiki members "monitor[ed] Conservapedia. And—by their own admission—engaged in acts of cyber-vandalism." A 2023 study published in Topics in Cognitive Science compared the two websites with Wikipedia.

=== Lenski dialogue ===
On June 9, 2008, the New Scientist published an article describing Richard Lenski's 20-year E. coli experiment, which reported that the bacteria had evolved, acquiring the ability to metabolize citrate. Disputing that bacteria could evolve via beneficial mutations, Schlafly contacted Lenski to request the data. Lenski explained that the relevant data was in the paper and that Schlafly fundamentally misunderstood it. Schlafly wrote again and requested the raw data. Lenski replied again that the relevant data was already in the paper, that the "raw data" were living bacterial samples, which he would willingly share with qualified researchers at properly equipped biology labs, and that he felt insulted by letters and comments on Conservapedia which he saw as brusque and offensive, including claims of outright deceit. The Daily Telegraph later called Lenski's reply "one of the greatest and most comprehensive put-downs in scientific argument".

The exchange, recorded on a Conservapedia page entitled "Lenski dialog", was widely reported on news-aggregating sites and web logs. Carl Zimmer wrote that it was readily apparent that "Schlafly had not bothered to read [Lenski's paper] closely", and PZ Myers criticized Schlafly for demanding data despite having neither a plan to use it nor the expertise to analyze it. During and after the Lenski dialogue on Conservapedia, several users on the site were blocked for "insubordination" for expressing disagreement with Schlafly's stance on the issue.

The dialogue between Lenski and Conservapedia is noted in Richard Dawkins' The Greatest Show on Earth: The Evidence for Evolution in a chapter concerning Lenski's research.

== Conservative Bible Project ==
Conservapedia hosts the "Conservative Bible Project", a project aiming to create a new English translation of the Bible in order to remove or alter terms described as importing "liberal bias". The project intends to remove sections of the Bible which are judged by Conservapedia's founder to be later liberal additions. These include the story of the adulteress in the Gospel of John in which Jesus declares "Let him who is without sin cast the first stone." The project also intends to remove Jesus's prayer on the cross, "Father, forgive them, for they do not know what they are doing", since it appears only in the Gospel of Luke and since, according to Schlafly, "the simple fact is that some of the persecutors of Jesus did know what they were doing. This quotation is a favorite of liberals but should not appear in a conservative Bible."

The Bible project has met with extensive criticism, including from fellow evangelistic Christian conservatives. Rod Dreher, a conservative writer and editor, described the project as "insane hubris" and "crazy"; he further described the project as "It's like what you'd get if you crossed the Jesus Seminar with the College Republican chapter at a rural institution of Bible learnin'". Ed Morrissey, another conservative Christian writer, wrote that bending the word of God to one's own ideology makes God subservient to an ideology, rather than the other way around. Creation Ministries International wrote "Forcing the Bible to conform to a certain political agenda, no matter if one happens to agree with that agenda, is a perversion of the Word of God and should therefore be opposed by Christians as much as 'politically correct' Bibles."

On October 7, 2009, Stephen Colbert called for his viewers to incorporate him into the Conservapedia Bible as a biblical figure and viewers responded by editing the Conservapedia Bible to include his name. The edits were, as a matter of course, treated as vandalism and removed. This was followed by an interview between Colbert and Schlafly on December 8, 2009.

== See also ==
- List of online encyclopedias
- Ruwiki (Wikipedia fork)
- Grokipedia
