= Journal of Information Technology & Politics =

Political science journal

- Discipline: Political science
- Language: English
- Edited by: Michael A. Xenos

Publication details
- Former name: Journal of E-Government
- History: 2004-present
- Publisher: Routledge on behalf of the American Political Science Association (United States)
- Frequency: Quarterly

Standard abbreviations
- ISO 4: J. Inf. Technol. Politics

Indexing
- ISSN: 1933-1681 (print); 1933-169X (web)
- LCCN: 2006212857
- OCLC no.: 71225825

Links
- Journal homepage; Online access; Online archive

The Journal of Information Technology & Politics is a quarterly peer-reviewed academic journal that was established in 2004 by Haworth Press as the Journal of E-Government. It obtained its current name in 2007 when the journal switched to Routledge. It is an official journal of the section on Information Technology & Politics of the American Political Science Association. The editor-in-chief is Stuart W. Shulman (University of Massachusetts Amherst). The journal covers research on the interaction of information technology with political and governmental processes. It is abstracted and indexed by Scopus.
