= Wikipedia and the Israeli–Palestinian conflict =

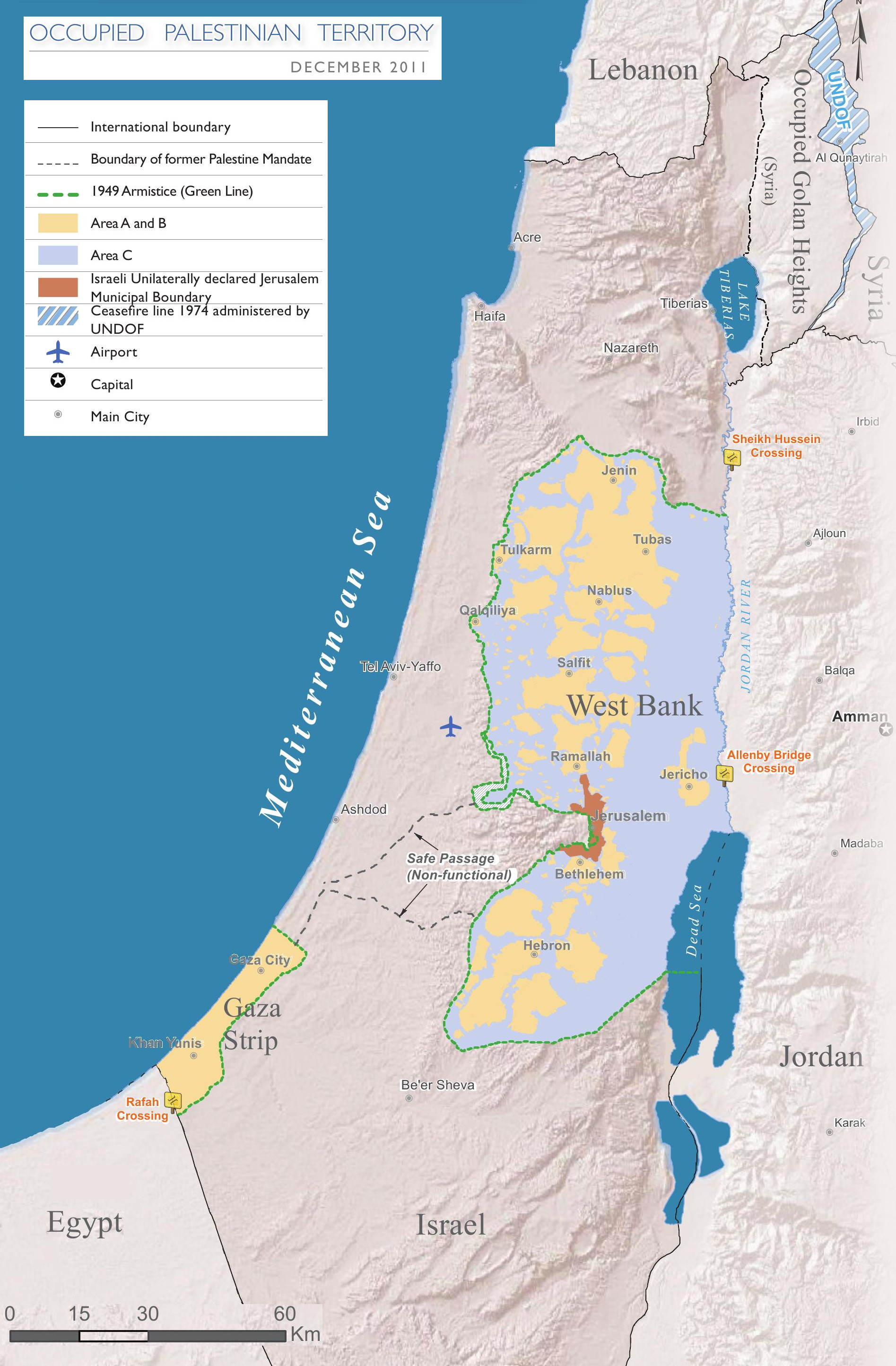
Situation in the Israeli-occupied territories, as of December 2011, per the United Nations OCHA

The Israeli–Palestinian conflict has been covered extensively on Wikipedia, facing criticism from advocates on both sides for perceived bias. External groups have launched coordinated editing campaigns to influence the encyclopedia's content. The volume of edits on topics related to the conflict has surged significantly since the October 7 attacks in 2023 and the ensuing Gaza war. Coverage of the conflict differs significantly among Wikipedia's language editions.

== History ==
Talk page banner for WikiProject Israel Palestine Collaboration, as of September 2026

Journalist Omer Benjakob of Haaretz suggests that "two warring camps" of pro-Israel and pro-Palestine Wikipedia editors emerged after the Second Intifada ended. During the Second Intifada, an article on Israel's West Bank barrier was created; the article initially called it a "security fence" and supported Israel, but it was later updated that day to include the phrase "apartheid wall".

In September 2006, WikiProject Israel was established to improve coverage of Israel-related topics. WikiProject Palestine was created two months later. In 2008, the WikiProject Israel Palestine Collaboration was set up to reconcile editing efforts, with the project's page reading: "In a subject plagued by conflicting historical narratives, we are working to make Wikipedia the conflict's most balanced reference point. Help us build bridges and break down barriers in the world's most intractable conflict."

In 2008, The Electronic Intifada, a pro-Palestinian organisation, published leaked emails from the pro-Israel watchdog Committee for Accuracy in Middle East Reporting in America (CAMERA) that purported to reveal an organised influence campaign on Wikipedia. The campaign suggested that pro-Israeli editors should pretend to be interested in other topics until elected as administrators. Once they became administrators, they were to use their powers to suppress pro-Palestinian editors and support pro-Israel editors. The emails resulted in at least five editors receiving lifetime bans on Wikipedia.

Also in 2008, after disputes reached a fever pitch over the Second Intifada and other articles about the Israeli-Palestinian conflict, Wikipedia's Arbitration Committee decided on a set of rules of conduct for editing articles related to the conflict. Editors are required to have made over 500 edits for at least 30 days to edit articles related to the conflict, can make only one revert per day across the entire field, and can be banned from editing related articles. The ruling was reaffirmed and expanded in 2009 and 2015. Since 2008, there have been four arbitration cases dealing with the conflict, usually in tandem with outbreaks of violence in the Middle East.

The Jerusalem Post reported in 2010 that "Israeli editors have sensed a growing presence of pro-Palestinian activists" on the English Wikipedia, and that there were calls for vigilance on Israel-related topics on the Hebrew Wikipedia. In August 2010, two Israeli right-wing groups, the Yesha Council and My Israel, ran a course on editing Wikipedia from a pro-Zionist point of view. Yesha Council director Naftali Bennett said, "We don't want to change Wikipedia or turn it into a propaganda arm. We just want to show the other side. People think that Israelis are mean, evil people who only want to hurt Arabs all day." In response, Abed A-Nassar, the chairman of the Association of Palestinian Journalists, called on Palestinian institutions to make Wikipedia articles more pro-Palestinian and counter what he called Israel's "public relations war".

In June 2013, Arnie Draiman, online communications editor for the pro-Israel group NGO Monitor, was indefinitely banned from editing Wikipedia articles about the Arab–Israeli conflict due to biased editing, concealing his place of work, and using a second account in a way Wikipedia policy forbids. Draiman was a major contributor to the articles on NGO Monitor and its founder Gerald Steinberg, and made hundreds of edits on articles about human rights organizations, including B'Tselem, the New Israel Fund, Human Rights Watch, and many others Steinberg opposes.

In 2014, Euronews reported that the Hebrew and Arabic articles on the 2014 Gaza war presented drastically different photographic narratives, with the English article having more balance.

In December 2017, after U.S. President Donald Trump announced that the U.S. would recognize Jerusalem as Israel's capital, Wikipedia followed suit, sparking debate among editors. At that time, the English and Hebrew Wikipedia articles said that Jerusalem was Israel's capital, while the Arabic Wikipedia article said that Israel claimed it as its capital, but it was in occupied Palestine. The same month, an edit war broke out between "pro-Israel" and "pro-Palestine" editors over the inclusion of allegations that Palestinian-American activist Linda Sarsour had rejected sexual harassment accusations in her article; Benjakob commented, "Though it is common for political disputes to play out on Wikipedia – for example, pro-Israel and pro-Palestinian editors fighting over contentious topics like Jerusalem's status – Sarsour's case highlights how the Israel-Palestine issue can sometimes trump other important ones."

In November 2020, Haaretz reported that the "West Bank bantustans" article comparing Israel's control of the West Bank to the Black-only enclaves in apartheid-era South Africa indicated a possible shift in Wikipedia's consensus on likening Israel to an apartheid regime. Editors said that the article's having survived a deletion proposal indicated that events such as the Trump peace plan and Benjamin Netanyahu's pledge to annex parts of the West Bank undermined Israel's talking point that it supported a two-state solution and strove to establish a Palestinian state.

Benjakob said in 2020:

Edit wars on the Israeli-Palestinian conflict have had a fundamental influence on how Wikipedia addresses contentious issues; for example, the practice of locking articles to public editing and permitting only editors with a username and certain level of Wikipedia experience to contribute. The result has been the emergence of two ideological camps, so-called pro-Israel and pro-Palestinian editors, who have been locked in what some describe as an editorial stalemate.

In February 2021, the Hebrew Wikipedia renamed its version of the article on the Israeli occupation of the West Bank, changing "occupation" to "rule". In July 2023, the Kohelet Policy Forum confirmed that one of its staff members had edited the Hebrew Wikipedia against their own and Wikipedia rules, using sock puppet accounts.

=== Gaza war (2023–present) ===
The Gaza war has been extensively covered on Wikipedia and other related projects in various languages. This included articles about the October 7 attacks, the 2023 Israeli blockade of the Gaza Strip, and the invasion that followed. Articles related to the war have experienced edit warring due to the diversity of narratives from both sides of the conflict; for example, in the war's first week, a Hebrew Wikipedia editor added information to articles on former Israeli security officials, but not Prime Minister Benjamin Netanyahu and his allies, in ways that arguably pointed to these officials' responsibility for Israel's failure to prevent the October 7 attacks. Editors have debated topics such as whether Israel should be called an example of "settler colonialism" or an "apartheid regime" and whether its military operations in Gaza should be classified as a genocide.

Arabic Wikipedia logo showing support for Palestinians. This logo has been in use at various times since December 2023.

The Wikimedia Foundation (WMF) issued a statement titled "Wikimedia updates on the crisis in Gaza Strip and Israel" on December 4, 2023, and another statement the next day calling for "an end to measures preventing access to the internet in the Gaza Strip".

On December 23, 2023, the Arabic Wikipedia changed its logo to the colors of the Palestinian flag and suspended editing articles for the day to protest the Israeli military campaign in Gaza as well as the bias of Western governments, especially the U.S., toward Israel. The step was taken to express solidarity and rejection of misinformation, according to a banner published on the Arabic Wikipedia's main page. Many Arab users and supporters of the Palestinian cause welcomed this solidarity, while some Israeli users criticized it for breaking Wikipedia's rules on neutrality.

In January 2024, the English-language Wikipedia's Arbitration Committee ("ArbCom") banned 11 editors from editing Palestine- and Israel-related pages for reasons including "non-neutral editing", "incivility", and coordination off Wikipedia to create teams who would approve edits. Of the editors, seven were accused of pushing pro-Palestine positions, and three of pushing pro-Israeli positions.

In early 2024, ArbCom banned three editors involved in a pro-Israel editing campaign. The committee's investigation found that after the October 7 attacks, one banned editor had begun directing other editors to edit articles related to the conflict, including the use of human shields, the Beit Rima raid, and crimes against Israel. One of the editors also urged colleagues to vote for an article that called the Gaza war a genocide to be deleted or merged. Some editors who were accused of whitewashing articles reflecting badly on Iran were also accused of biased editing of articles related to the Israeli–Palestinian conflict, such as creating an article on the 2024 Houthi drone attack on Israel; the article said the attack was "hailed as a victory for the oppressed Palestinian people and their fighters". It was later updated to attribute the attack to Hezbollah.

In June 2024, an edit war involving the English Wikipedia articles for the 2024 Nuseirat rescue operation and the Nuseirat refugee camp massacre took place, which led to the restriction of editing access to those articles. The 2024 Nuseirat rescue operation article was based on the official Israeli narrative, while the Nuseirat refugee camp massacre article relied on figures provided by the Gaza Health Ministry. In January 2025, after further discussion, the two articles were merged into an article titled "Nuseirat rescue and massacre".

In July 2024, the English Wikipedia article on "Allegations of genocide in the 2023 Israeli attack on Gaza" was renamed "Gaza genocide" after two months of debate. The article was added to the "List of genocides" article that November, and a section on Palestine was added to the "Genocide of indigenous peoples" article the same month.

In September 2024, Jewish Insider reported that a group of editors from the coalition "Tech for Palestine" had been using third-party tools, such as Discord, to coordinate efforts in what they called the "information battle for truth, peace and justice" on the "Wikipedia front". Their activities included compiling lists of pages they planned to edit, requesting specific changes, and sharing instructional "how-to" videos. One of their resources said: "Wikipedia is not just an online encyclopedia. It's a battleground for narratives." The investigation found that "The current conservative edit impact estimate for the group (based on available evidence) is 260 edits on 114 articles".

Map of Gaza as of 2025

According to Jewish Insider, the group was partially responsible for the decision to categorize the Anti-Defamation League as an unreliable source on topics related to the Israeli–Palestinian conflict. The Jewish Journal of Greater Los Angeles has suggested that despite the site's political neutrality, editors often attempt to inject their own bias when editing articles.

In December 2024, the Arbitration Committee banned two pro-Palestine editors indefinitely and restricted three others for "canvassing", or notifying fellow editors about a discussion pertaining to a specific edit "with the intention of influencing the outcome of a discussion a particular way". The committee accused the editors of "encouraging other users to game the extended confirmed restriction and engage in disruptive editing".

In January 2025, the Arbitration Committee topic-banned six "pro-Palestine" and two "pro-Israel" editors from editing articles related to the conflict. The bans were related to the editors' behavior and conduct, not their views. The Arbitration Committee also found that sock puppet accounts are "an ongoing issue... causing significant disruption". In addition to the bans, the Committee introduced the "balanced editing restriction", which requires sanctioned users to devote only a third of their edits to articles related to the Israeli–Palestinian conflict even when no misconduct rules have been violated.

In March 2026, the World Jewish Congress published a report alleging systemic bias in Arabic Wikipedia's coverage of the Arab–Israeli conflict. The report said that 25% to 50% of citations in related articles were drawn from sources linked to groups such as Hamas and Hezbollah, and criticized the use of phrases like "resistance factions" and "martyrdom operations". It also alleged that some senior administrators rejected Wikipedia's neutrality principle as a "Western concept" and blocked or banned editors who attempted to introduce neutral language.

== Commentary and response ==
Haaretz's Omer Benjakob noted in 2021 that the English, Hebrew, and Arabic Wikipedias' articles on the conflict are very different, and that the conflict is one of the three most regulated areas on English Wikipedia. In 2023, Stephen Harrison of Slate wrote, "It shouldn't come as a surprise that Wikipedia is a better place to learn about the Israeli-Palestinian conflict than X, TikTok, and other social media platforms are." Historian Shira Klein, comparing coverage of the Gaza war on English and Hebrew Wikipedia in 2024, said that the distortions lie in the Hebrew Wikipedia, and that there is "a bit of a war between Right and Left on Hebrew Wikipedia."

In a March 2024 World Jewish Congress (WJC) report, academic Shlomit Aharoni Lir wrote, "the state of the articles dealing with the conflict is alarming in its lack of neutrality." It also said that Wikipedia's comparisons between Israel and Nazi Germany article "normalizes the unacceptable comparison" due to terms such as "occupation" and "military actions". The WJC also reported that "deletion attacks" occurred on Wikipedia, resulting in simultaneous deletion nominations of the articles for the Netiv HaAsara, Nir Yitzhak and Holit massacres, as well as Inbal Rabin-Lieberman. A columnist in The Forward called the WJC's cited examples of bias against Israel "less than convincing". Klein also criticized the report.

A June 2024 Jerusalem Post opinion piece said the English version of the Gaza war article was arguably more neutral than the Arabic and Hebrew versions. Another, written in September, said that the titling of the "Gaza genocide" article should "by any reasonable measure, hammer a final nail into the coffin of Wikipedia's credibility as a reliable source of information about Israel and Jews." Ynetnews wrote in August 2024: "Since the war began, Wikipedia has become a battleground for information warfare, with significant power struggles between pro-Palestinian and pro-Israeli editors. According to Israeli editors, many entries are written from anti-Israel perspectives by editors using the platform to echo Palestinian messages." Israel Hayom wrote in September 2024: "Wikipedia is often subject to scrutiny, especially when it comes to contentious issues like the Israeli-Palestinian conflict. With millions of readers relying on the site for information, changes to entries like these can have significant implications for public understanding of historical events and modern geopolitical debates." According to an October 2024 report by writer Ashley Rindsberg of the media company Pirate Wires, a group of Wikipedia editors have a "coordinated operation" that has "systematically altered thousands of articles to tilt public opinion against Israel".

In January 2025, The Forward reported that the conservative think tank The Heritage Foundation was planning to dox Wikipedians who had added text it deemed antisemitic. It sent Jewish organizations a pitch deck it planned to use with tactics for exposing editors' identities. In response, the Wikipedia community decided to add the Heritage Foundation's website to the spam blacklist that March. In February 2025, Harrison said: "Let's be clear: Wikipedia's handling of this topic area is incredibly contentious. Many Wikipedians deliberately avoid pages like 'Gaza War,' 'Zionism,' and even the meta-entry on Wikipedia's own coverage of the Israeli–Palestinian conflict."

A March 2025 Anti-Defamation League (ADL) report said it had identified a "multiyear campaign by bad-faith editors to revise Wikipedia's content on Israel and the Israeli-Palestinian conflict". A letter from 23 members of the United States House of Representatives to the Wikimedia Foundation (WMF) cited this report, asking in part how the WMF prevents anti-Israel bias on Wikipedia and for Wikipedia to "provide us data on content disputes, edit reversions, and administrator actions related to antisemitic, anti-Zionist, or anti-Israel bias." Shira Klein, who is cited in the ADL report, criticized it and the letter, saying the ADL had misrepresented her study's findings. She said the report "doesn't apply an academic study's rigor, and its methodology is faulty", and that the purpose of the report and the letter was to control the narrative about Israel rather than to combat antisemitism, using the faulty premise that criticism of Israel or Zionism is inherently antisemitic. Historian Jan Grabowski, her co-author, disagreed with her criticism. Jewish Voice for Peace, an anti-Zionist group, called the report "outrageous" and "a transparent attempt to shut down criticism of Israel and retaliate against Wikipedia for pointing out the ADL's anti-Palestinian bias." In August 2025, Republicans on the United States House Committee on Oversight and Government Reform, citing the ADL report, started a probe into alleged bias on Wikipedia. The representatives said this was part of an investigation into "foreign operations and individuals at academic institutions subsidized by U.S. taxpayer dollars to influence U.S. public opinion."

In April 2025, interim U.S. Attorney for the District of Columbia Ed Martin sent the WMF a letter accusing it of "allowing foreign actors to manipulate information and spread propaganda" and said that this could violate the WMF's tax-exempt status.

=== From Wikipedia ===
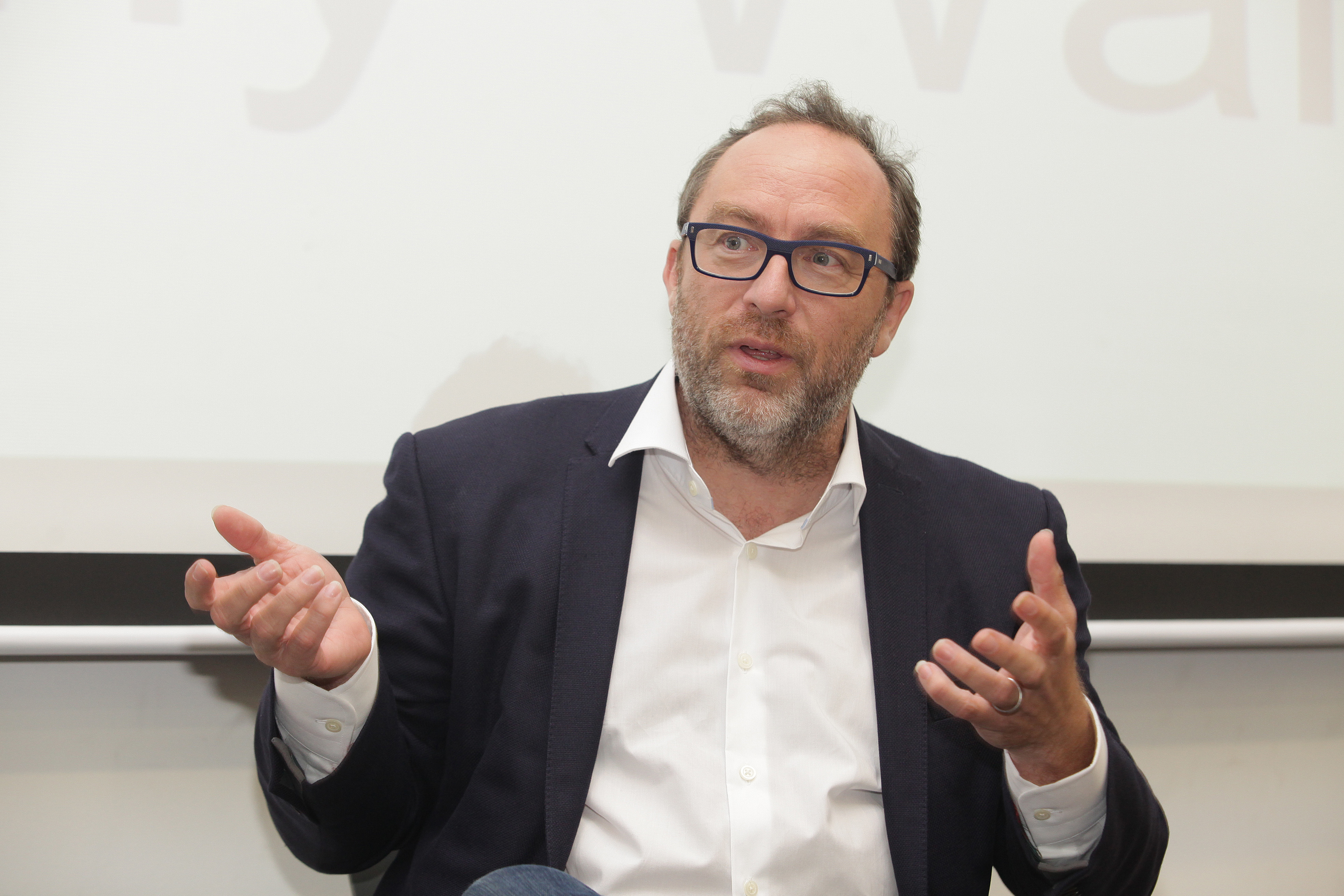
Jimmy Wales at a Wikimedia Israel conference in Tel Aviv, 2015

As of 2023, English Wikipedia articles on the Israeli–Palestinian conflict have "extended confirmed protection", meaning that unregistered users cannot edit, and registered users can edit only if their account is at least 30 days old and has made at least 500 edits. The WJC commented that this "leaves many Israelis unable to edit articles about which they have great knowledge."

==== Jimmy Wales ====
Wikipedia co-founder Jimmy Wales has said the topic is often debated but that the site strives to be neutral. In December 2024, he said, "In recent months, pages around Israel-Palestine have been difficult. That doesn't mean they've become one-sided in one direction or the other. But it does mean those conversations are harder as people sort of grapple with accusations of genocide and things like that. It also means the readers are more sensitized, so if a sentence isn't quite to their liking, they feel it as more of an intense slight."

In early November 2025, Wales said that the English Wikipedia article on the Gaza genocide was "one of the worst Wikipedia entries I've seen in a very long time" and that it "doesn't live up to our standards of neutrality." He also commented on the article's talk page that he had been asked about the article by a reporter and said that "the lede and the overall presentation state, in Wikipedia's voice, that Israel is committing genocide, although that claim is highly contested". Other editors of the article criticized his comments. 43 organizations, including the Council on American–Islamic Relations (CAIR), criticized what they saw as Wales's and Wikipedia co-founder Larry Sanger's effort to "censor the 'Gaza genocide' entry on Wikipedia".

== Reliability of the Anti-Defamation League ==
In June 2024, the English Wikipedia community declared the ADL a generally unreliable source about the conflict. An English Wikipedia administrator who evaluated the community's consensus for this discussion said there was substantial evidence of the ADL acting as a "pro-Israeli advocacy group" that has published unretracted misinformation "to the point that it taints their reputation for accuracy and fact checking regarding the Israeli-Palestinian conflict", as well as a "habit on the ADL's part of conflating criticism of the Israeli government's actions with antisemitism". Later that month, the English Wikipedia community concluded that the ADL's lack of reliability extended to "the intersection of antisemitism and the [Israeli-Palestinian] conflict, such as labeling pro-Palestinian activists as antisemitic", but "the ADL can roughly be taken as reliable on the topic of antisemitism when Israel and Zionism are not concerned".

James Loeffler of Johns Hopkins University, a professor of modern Jewish history, said the Wikipedia editors were "heavily influenced by the ADL leadership's comments", which took "a much more aggressive stance than most academic researchers in blurring the distinction between anti-Zionism and antisemitism".

The ADL criticized the decision, saying that it was part of a "campaign to delegitimize the ADL". ADL CEO Jonathan Greenblatt said that the ADL would do all it could to persuade Wikipedia's leadership that it was misunderstanding the situation.

== See also ==
- Antisemitism on Wikipedia
- Ideological bias on Wikipedia
- International reactions to the Gaza war
- Media coverage of the Gaza war
- Media coverage of the Israeli–Palestinian conflict
- Timeline of Wikipedia–U.S. government conflicts
- Wikipedia and the Russo-Ukrainian war
