= Holocaust Studies (journal) =

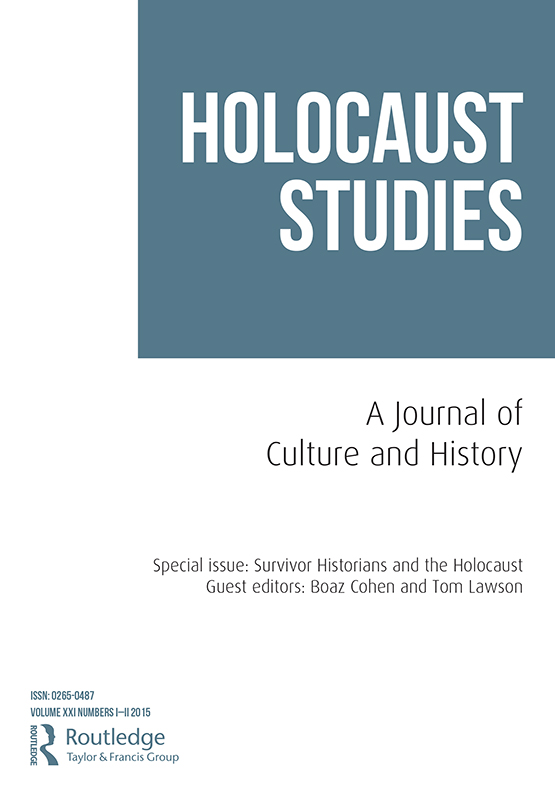
- Discipline: Holocaust studies
- Language: English
- Edited by: Hannah Holtschneider, James Jordan, Tom Lawson, Joanne Pettitt

Publication details
- Former name(s): British Journal of Holocaust Education, The Journal of Holocaust Education
- History: 1992–present
- Publisher: Routledge
- Frequency: Quarterly

Standard abbreviations
- ISO 4: Holocaust Stud.

Indexing
- ISSN: 1750-4902 (print); 2048-4887 (web)

Links
- Journal homepage; Online access; Online archive

Holocaust Studies: A Journal of Culture and History is a quarterly peer-reviewed academic journal covering Holocaust studies. It was formerly known as The Journal of Holocaust Education (1995–2004) and the British Journal of Holocaust Education (1992–1994). It is published by Routledge. It is associated with the British and Irish Association for Holocaust Studies. The journal is abstracted and indexed in Scopus and the Emerging Sources Citation Index.
