= Information World Review =

English knowledge trade magazine

- Categories: Information industry
- Frequency: Monthly
- Publisher: VNU Business Publications
- Founded: 1976
- First issue: 1976; 50 years ago
- Final issue: January 16, 2013; 13 years ago
- Country: United Kingdom
- Based in: London
- Website: iwr.co.uk (archived)
- ISSN: 0950-9879
- OCLC: 61313783

Information World Review was an English monthly trade magazine covering the information industry. It was established in 1976 and initially published by Learned Information Ltd and subsequently by VNU Business Publications.It was finally by Bizmedia Ltd. under license from Incisive Media.
