= Uppland Runic Inscription 613 =

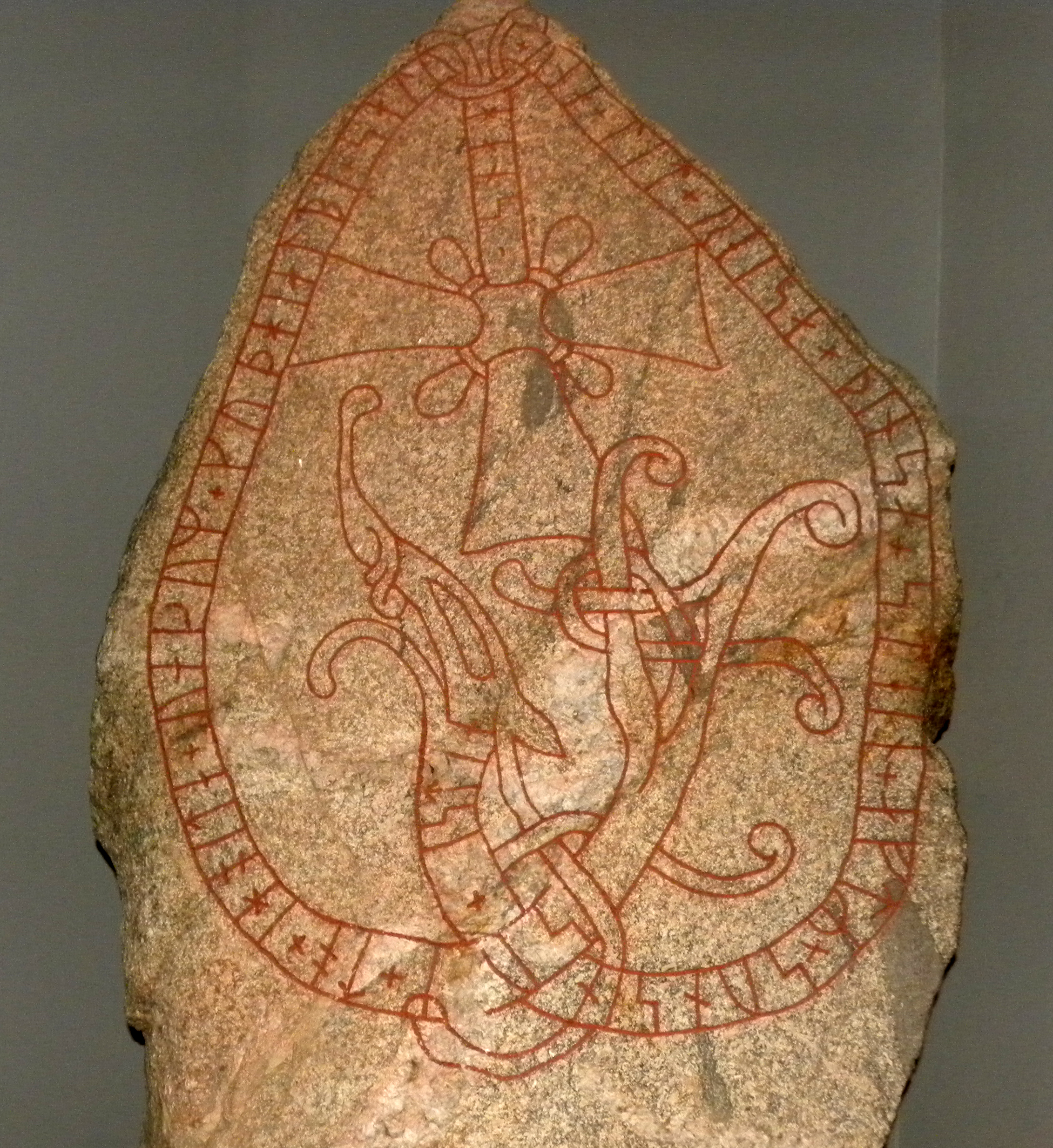
- Writing: Younger Futhark
- Discovered: Originally Torsätra, currently at the Swedish State Historical Museum in Stockholm, Uppland, Sweden
- Culture: Norse
- Rundata ID: U 613

Text – Native
- Old Norse : Una/Unna let ræisa þennsa stæin æftiʀ sun sinn Øystæin, sum do i hvitavaðum. Guð hialpi salu hans.

Translation
- Una/Unna had this stone raised in memory of his son Eysteinn who died in christening robes. May God help his soul.

Uppland Runic Inscription 613, also known as the Torsätra runestone, is the Rundata catalog number for a Viking Age memorial runestone originally located in Torsätra, which is approximately 8 kilometers northeast of Bro, Stockholm County, Sweden, which is in the historic province of Uppland.

== Description ==
U 613 was originally located near runestone U 614 beside a road at Torsätra, and was moved from its original location to the Swedish State Historical Museum in 1970. The inscription on this runestone, which is 1.6 meters in height, consists of runic text carved upon a serpent which surrounds a cross, with the final word of the text carved on the upper section of the cross. The inscription is considered to be carved in either runestone style Pr3 or Pr4, which is also known as Urnes style. This runestone style is characterized by slim and stylized animals that are interwoven into tight patterns. The animal heads are typically seen in profile with slender almond-shaped eyes and upwardly curled appendages on the noses and the necks.

Both U 613 and U 614 on stylistic grounds are attributed to the runemaster Visäte, who was active in the last half of the eleventh century. This attribution dates the inscription from about 1060 to 1070. Eight surviving runestones that are signed by Visäte include U 74 in Husby, U 208 in Råcksta, U 236 in Lindö, U 337 in Granby, U 454 in Kumla, U 669 in Kålsta, U 862 in Säva, and U Fv1946;258 in Fällbro, and over twenty others have been attributed to this runemaster based on stylistic analysis. Although U 613 and U 614 have somewhat different designs, with U 614 having no cross, Visäte is known to have varied his composition when a second runestone was raised near another of his. Another pair of his runestones with differing designs are U 293 and U Fv1972;172 at Lilla Vilunda, with U 293 having a design similar to U 613 and the other having a quite different design with one intertwined serpent that is above a runic band that cuts across the bottom of the inscription and no cross.

The runic text states that the stone was raised by a woman named either Una or Unna as a memorial to a son named Eysteinn. The text states that the deceased died i hvitavaðum, an Old Norse phrase which is usually translated as meaning "in christening robes." Other runestones using this phrase include the now-lost U 243 in Molnby, U 364 in Gådersta, U 699 in Amnö, U 896 originally from Håga, U 1036 in Tensta, and U Fv1973;194 at the Uppsala Cathedral. The text ends with a prayer for the soul of Eysteinn. The Norse word salu for soul in the prayer was imported from English and was first recorded as being used during the tenth century.

== Transliteration of runic text into Latin letters ==
+ una + lit + reisa + þinsa + stein + aftʀ + sun sin + istin sum + to + i hoita+uaþum + kuþ hialbi + salu hans ÷

== See also ==
- List of runestones
