= Lilla Vilunda runestones =

Viking Age memorial runestones in Upplands Väsby, Stockholm County, Sweden

The Lilla Vilunda runestones are three Viking Age memorial runestones that were erected by members of the same family and which are located at Lilla Vilunda (also known as Stallgatan) in Upplands Väsby, Stockholm County, Sweden, and in the historic province of Uppland.

== U 293 ==
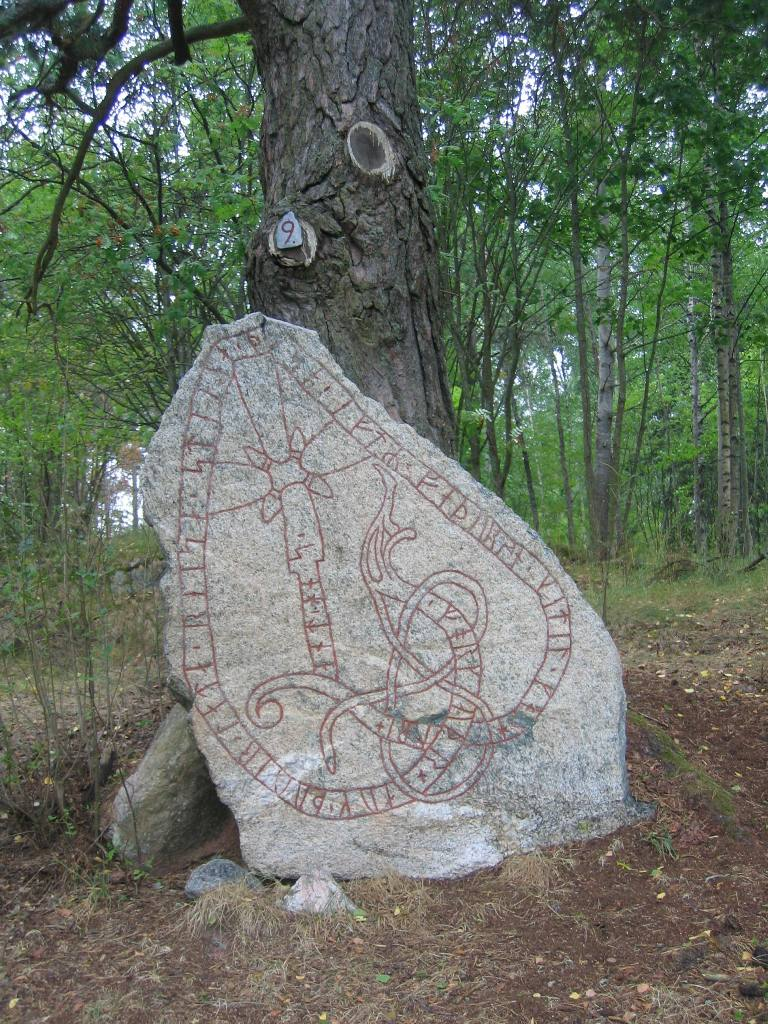
Runestone U 293.

Runic inscription U 293 is the Rundata catalog number for an inscription on a gneiss stone that is 1.8 meters in height. This stone was identified during the runestone surveys conducted in Sweden during the 17th century by Johannes Bureus and Johannes Rhezelius. The inscription consists of runic text carved on a serpent that encloses a Christian cross. The inscription is classified as being carved in runestone style Pr3 or Pr4, which is also known as Urnes style. This runestone style is characterized by slim and stylized animals that are interwoven into tight patterns. The animal heads are typically seen in profile with slender almond-shaped eyes and upwardly curled appendages on the noses and the necks. For stylistic reasons, the inscription has been attributed to the runemaster Visäte, who was active during the last half of the 11th century in southern Uppland. Eight surviving runestones that are signed by Visäte include U 74 in Husby, U 208 in Råcksta, U 236 in Lindö, U 337 in Granby, U 454 in Kumla, U 669 in Kålsta, U 862 in Säva, and U Fv1946;258 in Fällbro, and over twenty others have been attributed to this runemaster based on stylistic analysis.

The runic text states that the stone is a memorial raised by two brothers named Forkunnr and Þórir in memory of their father Ketill. Readers of the text would consider Forkunnr to be the elder brother as he was listed first. Consistent with the cross in the inscription, the text ends with a prayer for the soul of Ketill. The composition emphasizes the runes for ant ' hns meaning and hans ("his spirit") by placing the words on the extension that rises up to the bottom of the cross. The inscription also uses the word stæina or stones, suggesting that a second memorial stone was also raised. Nearby to this runestone is a cemetery with a tall menhir, and it has been suggested that the use of the plural stones refers to this stone.

=== Inscription ===
==== Transliteration of the runes into Latin characters ====
' forkuþr × auk ' þurir × lata ' reisa ' steina ' þisa ' eftʀ ' faþur sn ' ketil ' koþ hi-lbi + ant ' hns '

==== Transcription into Old Norse ====
Forkuðr ok Þoriʀ lata ræisa stæina þessa æftiʀ faður sinn Kætil. Guð hi[a]lpi and hans.

==== Translation in English ====
Forkunnr and Þórir have raised these stones in memory of their father Ketill. May God help his spirit.

== U 294 ==
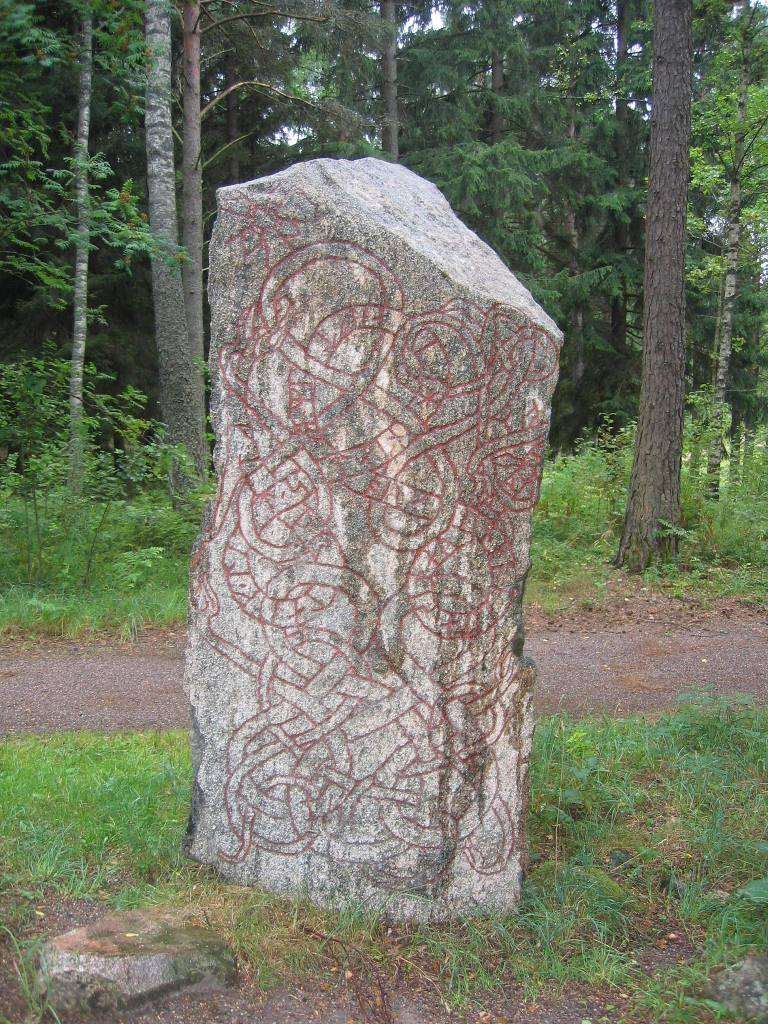
Runestone U 294.

Runic inscription U 294 is the Rundata catalog number for this inscription carved on a granite stone that is 2.1 meters in height. It is about 200 meters from runestone U 293, and U Fv1972;172 is located between these two stones. All three stones were apparently located alongside a former road to the nearby village of Smedby in Uppland. Similar to U 293, this stone was also identified during the surveys of the 17th century. The inscription consists of runic text carved on several intertwined serpents. The inscription is classified as being carved in either runestone style Pr3 or Pr4, both of which are considered to be Urnes style.

The runic text states that it is a memorial raised by a woman named Guðlaug in memory of her husband Forkunnr, who himself had raised runestone U 293. The text indicates that Ketilelfr also was responsible for having the inscription carved. Ketilelfr is likely to have been a relation to Forkunnr because his name has a common element with Forkunnr's father, Ketill. A common practice at that time in Scandinavia was the repeating one of the name elements from a member of one generation in the names of the children of the next generation to show a family connection.

=== Inscription ===
==== Transliteration of the runes into Latin characters ====
kuþrlauk * lit * stain hkua iftiʀ * forkun bonta * sin auk kitelfʀ

==== Transcription into Old Norse ====
Guðlaug let stæin haggva æftiʀ Forkunn, bonda sinn, ok Kætilælfʀ(?).

==== Translation in English ====
Guðlaug had the stone cut in memory of Forkunnr, her husbandman; and Ketilelfr (also had it cut).

== U Fv1972;172 ==
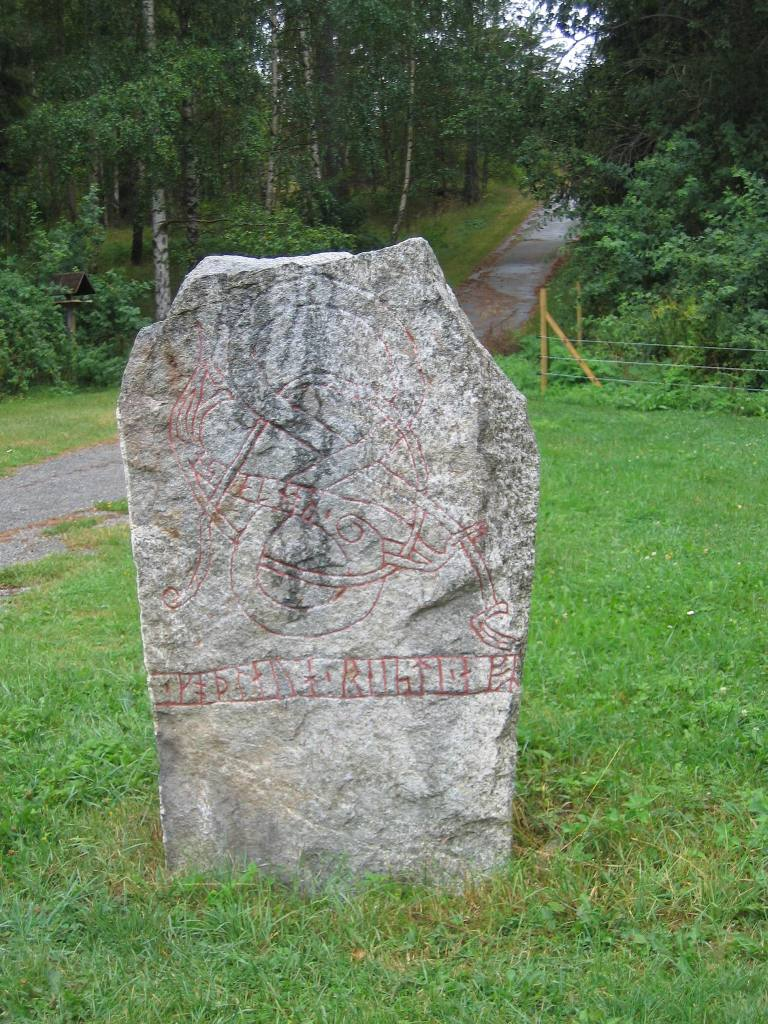
Runestone U Fv1972;172.

Runic inscription U Fv1972;172 is the Rundata catalog number for a granite runestone that is 1.6 meters in height. It was discovered while digging a trench for an electrical cable on December 19, 1971, and raised at this spot, which is believed to be the stone's original location. Its inscription consists of an intertwined serpent that is above a runic band that cuts across the bottom of the inscription. This inscription is classified as being carved in runestone style Pr4, which is also known as Urnes style.

Similar to runestone U 293, this runestone also has been attributed to the runemaster Visäte. When carving a second runestone near another one of his, Visäte would use a different design from the first, as was done here. Another example of a pair of runestones where Visäte varied his composition on the second stone is U 613 and U 614 from Torsätra.

The runic text states that Guðlaug raised the runestone as a memorial to her husband, who is not named. It is believed that this inscription was carved after the nearby inscription U 294, and thus it was not necessary to name her husband Forkunnr since it was already on the other runestone. Most of the text is on the runic band, but the runes bonta sn for bonda sinn ("her husbandman") are separated from the main text and carved on the serpent. The spelling of the name Guðlaug on this inscription uses an o-rune instead of a u-rune as was done on U 294. This alternative spelling is similar to that of Guð ("God") on inscriptions U 74 in Husby and U 337 in Granby, both of which are signed by Visäte, which also use an o-rune instead of a u-rune.

The Rundata designation for this Uppland inscription, U Fv1972;172, refers to the year and page number of the issue of Fornvännen in which the runestone was first described.

=== Inscription ===
==== Transliteration of the runes into Latin characters ====
' koþlauh ' reisti ' afʀ ' bonta sn

==== Transcription into Old Norse ====
Guðlaug ræisti æftiʀ bonda sinn.

==== Translation in English ====
Guðlaug raised (the stone) in memory of her husbandman.

== See also ==
- List of runestones
