= Uppland Runic Inscription 614 =

Coordinates: 59.5744°N 17.7668°E

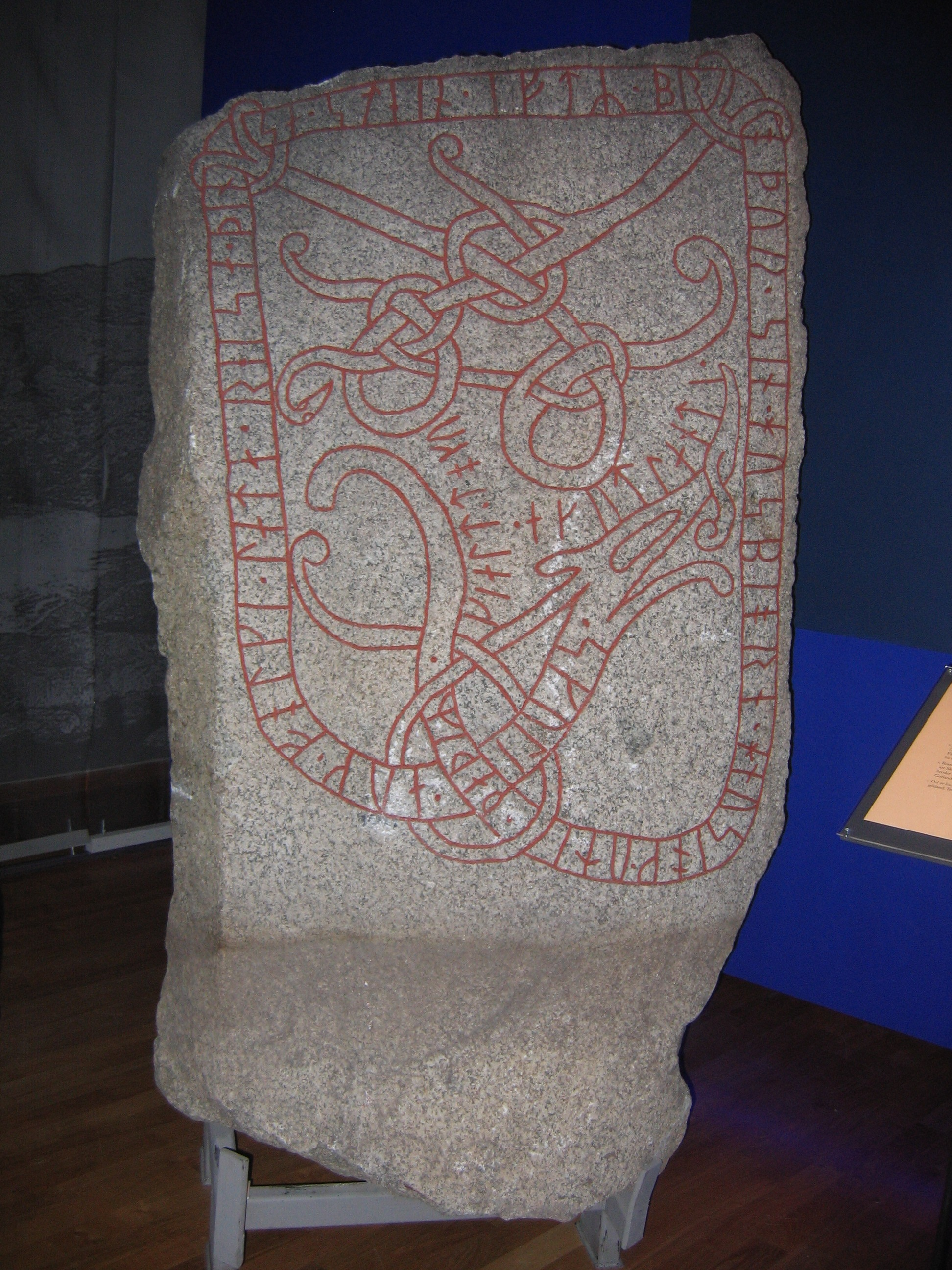
The Torsätra runestone.

The Torsätra runestone, cataloged by Rundata as runic inscription U 614, is a Viking Age memorial runestone originally located in Torsätra, which is around 8 kilometers northeast of Bro, Stockholm County, Sweden, which is in the historic province of Uppland.

== Description ==
The Torsätra runestone was raised in memory of one of the Swedish king's tribute collectors who fell ill and died during a trip to Gotland. The granite stone is 1.45 meters in height and was originally located near runestone U 613 in Torsätra. The stone was moved from its original location in 2005 to allow construction on a military training area, and is currently in the Swedish Museum of National Antiquities in Stockholm. It is considered to be a good example of runestone style Pr3, which is also known as the Urnes style. This runestone style is characterized by slim and stylized animals that are interwoven into tight patterns. The animal heads are typically seen in profile with slender almond-shaped eyes and upwardly curled appendages on the noses and the necks.

The inscription is unsigned but, along with U 613, has been attributed to the runemaster Visäte, who was active in the last half of the eleventh century. This attribution dates the inscription from about 1060 to 1070. Eight surviving runestones that are signed by Visäte include U 74 in Husby, U 208 in Råcksta, U 236 in Lindö, U 337 in Granby, U 454 in Kumla, U 669 in Kålsta, U 862 in Säva, and U Fv1946;258 in Fällbro, and over twenty others have been attributed to this runemaster based on stylistic analysis. Although U 613 and U 614 have somewhat different designs, with U 614 having no cross, Visäte is known to have varied his composition when a second runestone was raised near another of his. Another pair of his runestones with differing designs are U 293 and U Fv1972;172 at Lilla Vilunda, with U 293 having a design similar to U 613 and the other having a quite different design with one intertwined serpent that is above a runic band that cuts across the bottom of the inscription and no cross.

The runic text states that the stone was raised by two brothers in memory of their brother, who was named either Húsbjǫrn or Ásbjǫrn, who fell ill and died while abroad in Gotland. The inscription has the runes kialt * toku * a kutlanti * or gjald tóku á Gotlandi ("took payment on Gotland") carved outside of the serpent. Gjald is a term used to refer to payments taken in England on runestones Sö 166 in Grinda, U 194 in Väsby, U 241 in Lingsberg, U 344 in Yttergärde, and Vg 119 in Sparlösa (where the context is unclear), and from this U 614 is cited as evidence that a Swedish king collected tribute or taxes from Gotland. Other runestones which mention Gotland include Sö 174 in Aspö, the now-lost U 414 in Norrsunda, U 527 in Frötuna, DR 220 in Sønder Kirkeby, DR 259 in Fuglie, possibly Sö 47 in Vålsta, where the text has been damaged, and with U 375 in Vidbo referring to a location on Gotland. U 527, similar to U 614, states that the deceased died from an illness while on Gotland. The runes on U 614 that indicate that "he was sick," hnusiok, follow the rule that double consonants are represented with only a single consonant, even if one of the two consonants are at the end of one word and the second is at the beginning of the next word. The transliteration of the runic text for these words, hn us| |siok, shows word divisions and a separate s-rune for each of the two words.

== Inscription ==
* skuli * auk * folki * lata * reisa * þinsa * stein * iftʀ * broþur * sin * husbiorn * hn us| |siok * uti * þa þiʀ * kialt * toku * a kutlanti *
{} Skuli {} ok {} Folki {} lata {} ræisa {} þennsa {} stæin {} æftiʀ {} broður {} sinn {} Husbiorn/Asbiorn. {} Hann vas siukʀ {} uti, {} þa þæiʀ {} giald {} toku {} a Gutlandi. {}
Skúli and Folki have raised this stone in memory of their brother Húsbjǫrn/Ásbjǫrn. He was sick abroad when they took payment on Gotland.

== See also ==
- List of runestones
