= Lars Aronsson =

Swedish programmer and consultant

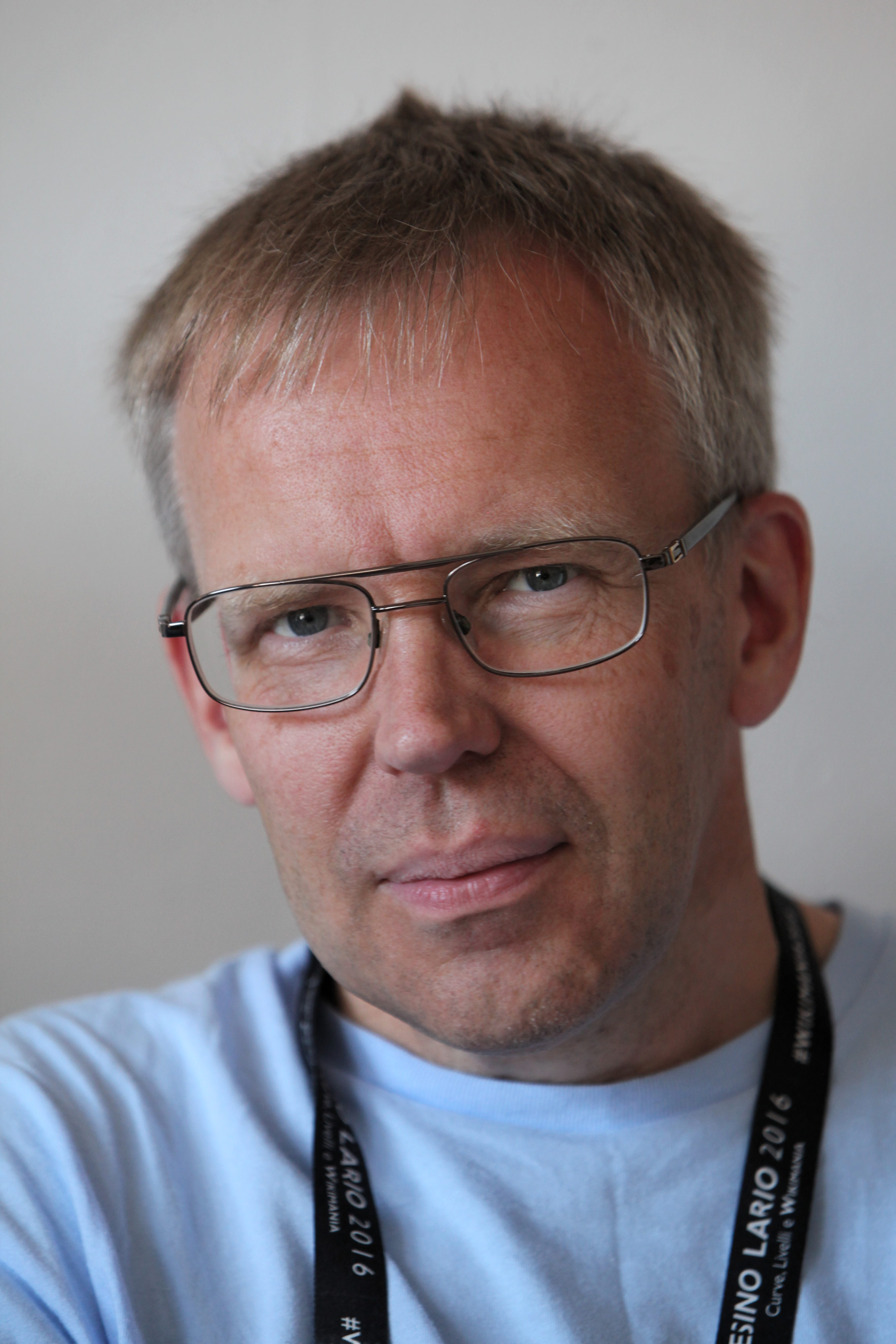
- Lars Aronsson at the 2016 edition of Wikimania
- Born: Lars Erik Aronsson; March 19, 1966 (age 60); Örebro, Sweden
- Citizenship: Swedish
- Occupations: Engineer, programmer
- Organization(s): Project Runeberg (1992); Susning.nu (2001-2009); Wikimedia Sverige (co-founder 2007)

Lars Erik Aronsson (born 19 March 1966) is a Swedish engineer and programmer.

Aronsson has lived in Linköping since 1985. In 1992, he founded and continues to operate Project Runeberg, a free digital archive of out-of-copyright public domain Swedish literature. Between 2001 and 2009, he founded and managed Susning.nu, a Swedish-language wiki, before its closure in light of the rapid growth of the Swedish Wikipedia. In 2007, Lars Aronsson, together with Lennart Guldbrandsson, co-founded Wikimedia Sverige, an independent local chapter of the American Wikimedia Foundation.

Additionally, Aronsson operates as an entrepreneur in the computer industry through his firm, Aronsson Datateknik.

In 2007, he was awarded the IP Prize by the Swedish Network Users' Society (SNUS) for his work on Project Runeberg, Susning.nu, and Wikimedia Sverige. Aronsson has also been recognized for his contributions to OpenStreetMap. In 2024, he was awarded the Wikimedia Prize by Wikimedia Sverige, in recognition of "his efforts in spreading free knowledge."
