= LSJ (disambiguation) =

LSJ is a common reference name for A Greek-English Lexicon, from its editors, Liddell-Scott-Jones.

LSJ may also refer to:

- LSJ, a type of GM Ecotec engine
- Lansing State Journal, a daily newspaper in Lansing, Michigan
- London School of Journalism, a journalism school in London, England
- Lars Sverker Johansson, also known as Lsj, the creator of Lsjbot
- Little Saint James, a private island in the U.S. Virgin Islands
