= Cebuano Wikipedia =

Cebuano-language edition of Wikipedia

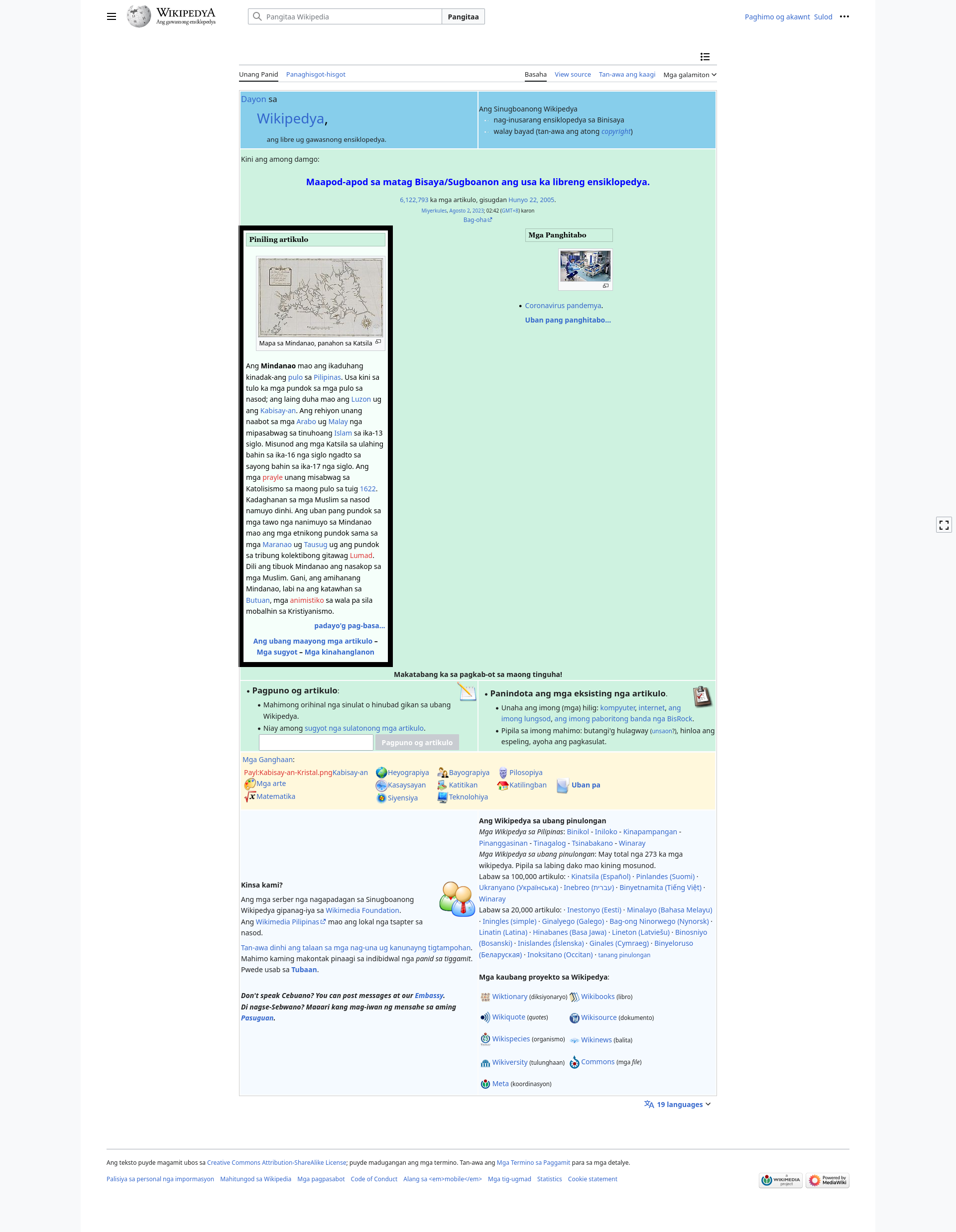
- Screenshot
- Website type: Internet encyclopedia project
- Available in: Cebuano
- Owner: Wikimedia Foundation
- Creators: Bentong Isles, Cebuano-speaking Wikipedia user community.
- Website: ceb.wikipedia.org
- Commercial: No
- Registration: Optional
- Users: 150,319 (as of 7 November 2026)
- Launched: 22 June 2005; 21 years ago
- Content license: Creative Commons Attribution/ Share-Alike 4.0 (most text also dual-licensed under GFDL); Media licensing varies

The Cebuano Wikipedia (Cebuano: Wikipedya sa Sinugboanong Binisayâ) is the Cebuano-language edition of Wikipedia, the free online encyclopedia. Despite being the second-largest Wikipedia in numbers of articles, it has a small community of only 245 active users; nearly all of the 6,116,266 articles were initially created through automatic programs, most notably Sverker Johansson's Lsjbot.

== Importance in the language area ==
It is the largest Philippine-language Wikipedia by number of articles, ahead of Waray Wikipedia and Tagalog Wikipedia (which as of 7 November 2026 have 1,267,057 and 50,783 articles respectively).

Cebuano is the second most spoken language in the Philippines with about 20 million speakers. The Cebuano-language Wikipedia community has claimed to be the only online encyclopedia in this language.

However, Cebuano Wikipedia does not appear to be widely used in the Philippines; as of March 2021, 90 percent of Wikipedia views from that country were directed at English Wikipedia, with 5 percent going to Tagalog and 3 percent to Russian Wikipedia. About 30 percent of Cebuano Wikipedia views come from China, 22 percent from the United States, and only about 11 percent from the Philippines (roughly the same number as from France). An early version of the Wikipedia had many bot-generated articles on French communes, and few articles that might be deemed specifically relevant to Cebuano speakers.

== History and growth of articles ==
The Cebuano-language Wikipedia was launched in June 2005. In January 2006, 1,000 articles were created, while in November 2006 there were 1,400 articles. At the end of 2006 and 2007, the bots created ten thousand articles on municipalities in France.

By the end of 2012, the number of articles increased to about 30,000. In December 2012, Lsjbot began to create articles. As a result, the number of articles increased dramatically in 2013, and from February to December 2013, the number of articles increased ninefold. By the end of 2015, about 99 percent of the then 1.4 million articles had been created by bots, including about 25,000 articles about localities and the rest of articles about living beings by Lsjbot. Sverker Johansson, the creator of Lsjbot, focused on the Cebuano Wikipedia as his wife is a native Cebuano speaker; Johansson himself is not fluent in the language.

On 16 July 2014, the Cebuano-language Wikipedia comprised one million articles, making it the 12th-largest Wikipedia. After overtaking Spanish-, Italian-, Russian-, French-, Dutch- and German-speaking Wikipedia within a year and a half, in February 2016 it reached the two-million mark. After about half a year, followed by the third million, and another half a year later, the fourth million. In August 2017, the five millionth article was created, and it became the second largest Wikipedia.

Many of the bot-created pages were found to have grammatical or factual errors, and due to the low ratio of human editors to articles, articles are not maintained or improved often. A 2018 proposal to delete the entire Wikipedia and start over received little support. One editor claimed that the quality of other Philippine language Wikipedias was dragged down, as they started competing on quantity with the Cebuano Wikipedia.

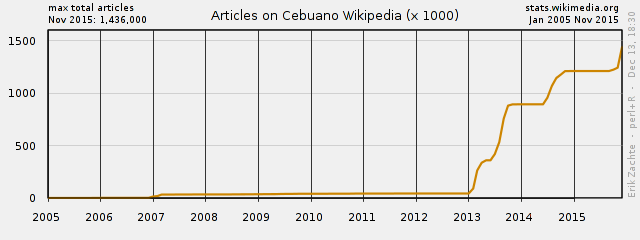
The number of articles in Cebuano Wikipedia

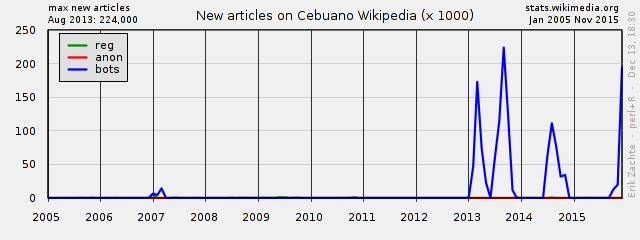
New articles by user groups, bots in blue

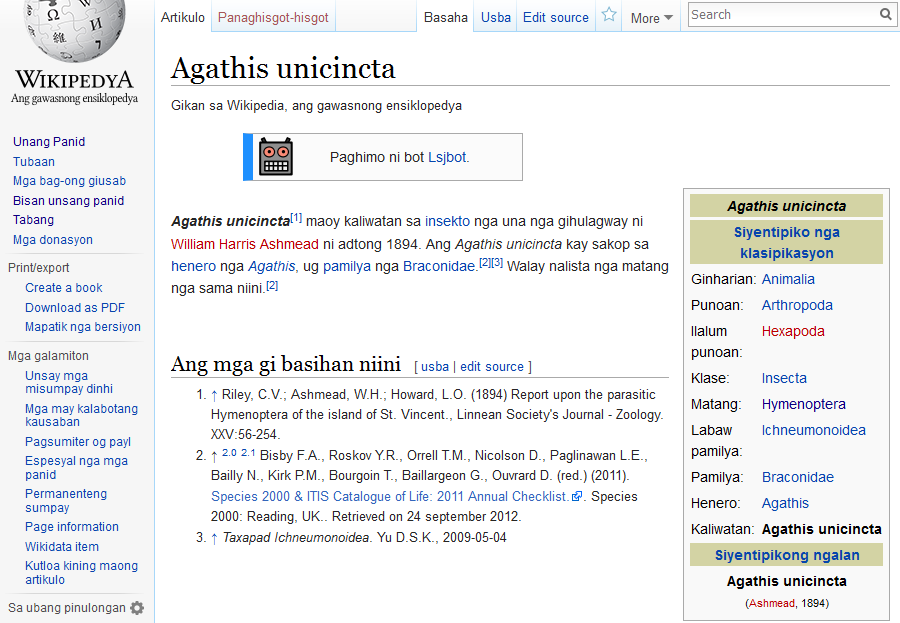
Typical automated article by Lsjbot

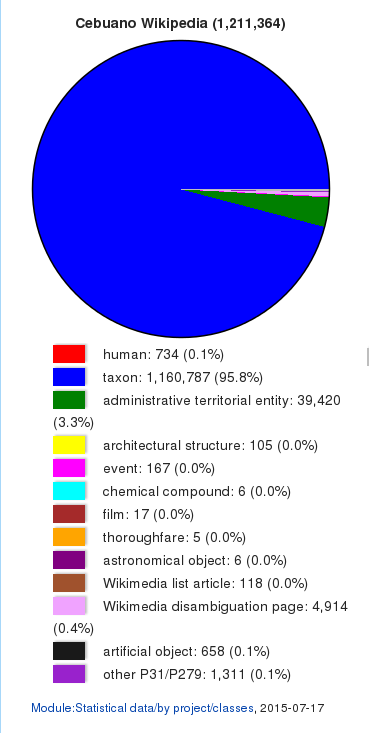
Pie chart of article content in the Cebuano-language Wikipedia (July 2015, 1,211,364 articles)

Milestones:
Date	Number of articles
9 July 2005	19 articles
30 August 2005	232 articles
1 January 2006	1,000 articles
1 November 2006	1,400 articles
1 January 2007	13,521 articles
7 February 2007	26,511 articles
2 February 2013	100,000 articles
9 February 2013	150,000 articles
17 March 2013	300,000 articles
26 June 2013	400,000 articles
18 July 2013	500,000 articles
7 August 2013	600,000 articles
16 July 2014	1,000,000 articles
6 December 2015	1,500,000 articles
14 February 2016	2,000,000 articles
25 September 2016	3,000,000 articles
11 February 2017	4,000,000 articles
8 August 2017	5,000,000 articles
14 October 2021	6,000,000 articles

An analysis of Cebuano Wikipedia content on Wikidata in July 2015 showed that of the then 1.21 million articles, 95.8 percent are on living beings and biological species (1,160,787) and 3.3 percent are cities and communities (39,420).
