= Sverker Johansson =

Swedish physicist and Wikipedian (born 1961)

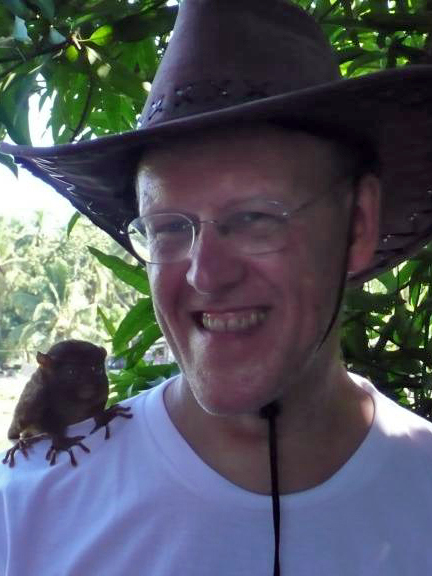
- Johansson in November 2008
- Education: University of Lund; University of Gothenburg
- Scientific career
- Fields: Physics, linguistics

Lars Sverker Johansson is a Swedish physicist, linguist, textbook author and university professor. He created Lsjbot, a Wikipedia bot.

== Biography ==
Sverker Johansson is a doctor of philosophy in physics and a master of philosophy in linguistics. He received his doctorate in physics in 1990 on a thesis in particle physics on μμ and eμ pair production at the experiment HELIOS at the collider SPS and software development for the experiment DELPHI at the collider LEP, both experiments at CERN. He has subsequently worked as a researcher in several fields, mainly neutrino-related particle physics with the AMANDA experiment but also in the origin of language.

During his career, he has mainly worked at the University of Jönköping.

Johansson's book Origins of Language, Constraints of Hypotheses, and Convergence Evidence in Language and Communication Studies, published in 2005, has been reviewed by the Journal of Linguistics.

In 2011, Johannson started making bots on Wikipedia, which have since made millions of edits.

In 2012, he presented the theory that Neanderthals used language in "Essay on Neanderthal Language".

In 2014, a new article creation project was launched using Lsjbot, with the aim of producing basic articles about the world's geographical locations. As a result of this and subsequent projects, the bot created approximately 2.7 million articles in the same year, eventually reaching 9.5 million by 2019. This massive automated output was primarily distributed across the Swedish Wikipedia, Cebuano Wikipedia, and Waray Wikipedia.

Although Lsjbot's mass-creation phase ceased in 2020 due to shifting community consensus, the bot's verifiable impact heavily dictates the size of these encyclopedias today. Lsjbot is responsible for initially creating nearly all of the Cebuano Wikipedia's 6,116,397 articles and the vast majority of the Waray Wikipedia's 1,267,083 articles. However, because the Swedish Wikipedia community later voted to mass-delete millions of the bot's automated stubs, only a fraction of Johansson's original contributions remain within the Swedish Wikipedia's current total of 2,630,772 articles.

== See also ==
- List of Wikipedia people
