= WMCA =

WMCA may refer to:

- WMCA (AM), a radio station operating in New York City
- West Midlands Combined Authority, the combined authority of the West Midlands metropolitan county in the United Kingdom
- Wikimedia Canada, the official Canadian chapter of the Wikimedia Foundation
