= Wikipedia for World Heritage =

Efforts to get Wikipedia listed as a UNESCO World Heritage Site

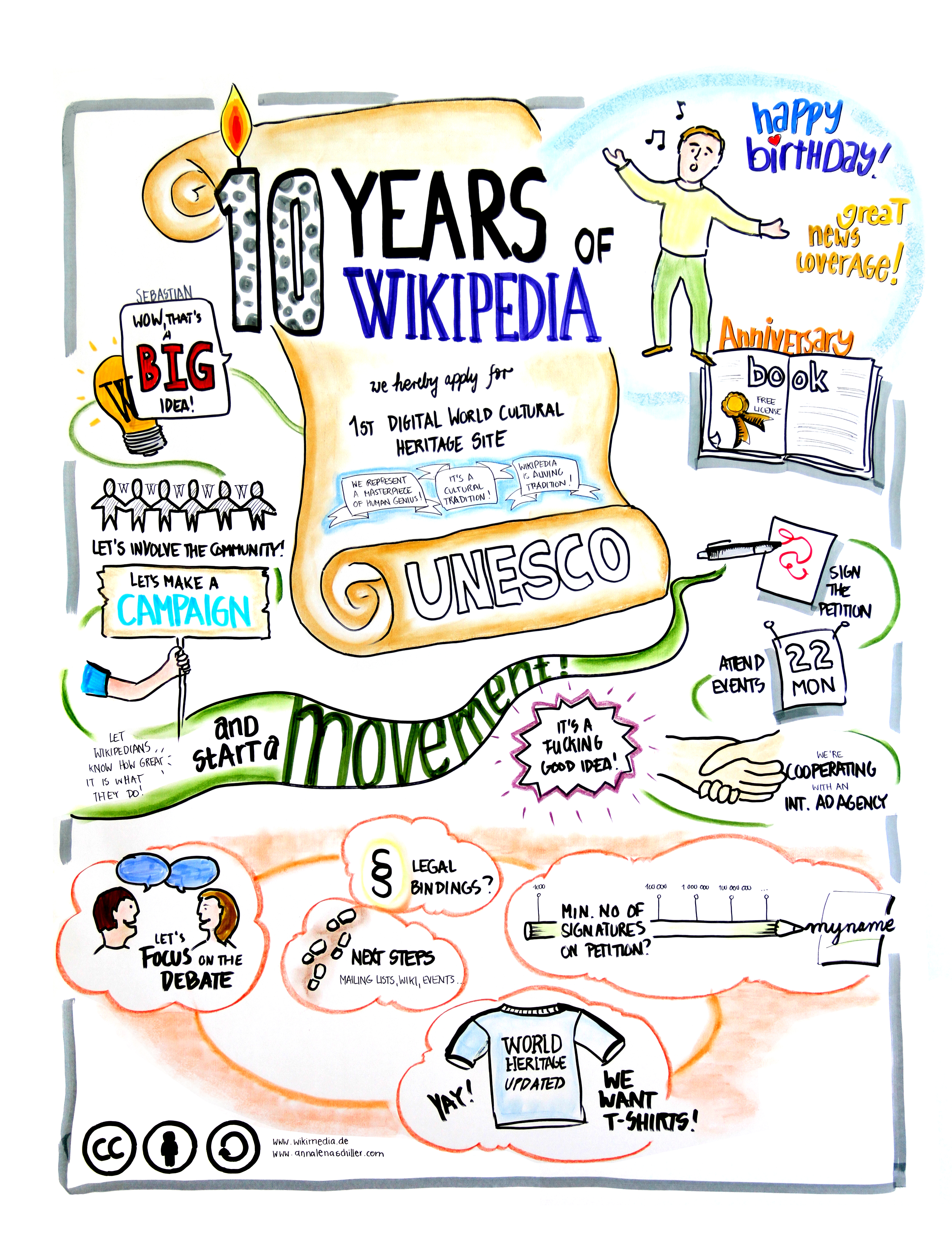
A visual presented supporting Wikipedia's listing at the Wikimedia Conference Berlin 2011

Wikipedia for World Heritage refers to the efforts put forth to get Wikipedia listed as a UNESCO World Heritage Site. The idea was originally proposed to the Wikimedia chapter by the Wikimedia Foundation at the 2011 Wikimedia Conference in Berlin. An online petition was started at the German Wikipedia on May 23, 2011. That same day the Edmonton Journal published a piece in which it called the bid 'a long-shot bet' inferring the platform was not a culturally defining artefact. Wikipedia was also argued to be 'lacking the effect or maturity for listing' as World Heritage. The bid is considered to be the first for a digital entity and is expected to be controversial with the list's maintainers who are notably conservative.

Jimbo Wales has stated that "the basic idea is to recognize that Wikipedia is this amazing global cultural phenomena that has transformed the lives of hundreds of thousands of people."

If Wikipedia does not get listed as a World Heritage Site, and UNESCO has denied its application as it does not meet most criteria, it has been suggested that they apply for UNESCO Intangible Cultural Heritage Lists.
