= Tagalog Wikipedia =

Tagalog-language edition of Wikipedia

Tagalog Wikipedia Wikipedyang Tagalog

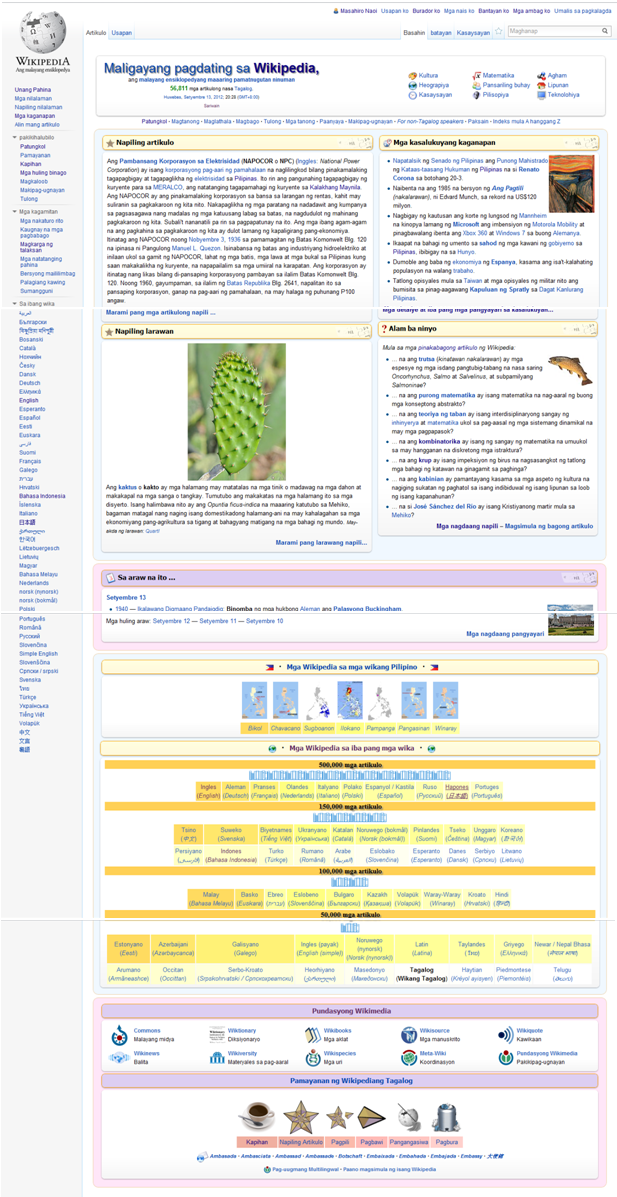
- Screenshot
- Website type: Online encyclopedia
- Available in: Tagalog
- Owner: Wikimedia Foundation
- Website: tl.wikipedia.org
- Commercial: No
- Registration: Optional
- Users: 166,813 (as of 1 November 2026)
- Launched: 1 December 2003; 22 years ago
- Content license: Creative Commons Attribution/ Share-Alike 4.0 (most text also dual-licensed under GFDL); Media licensing varies

The Tagalog Wikipedia (Tagalog: Wikipedyang Tagalog; Baybayin: ᜏᜒᜃᜒᜉᜒᜇ᜕ᜌᜅ᜕ ᜆᜄᜎᜓᜄ᜕ or ᜏᜒᜃᜒᜉᜒᜇ᜔ᜌᜅ᜔ ᜆᜄᜎᜓᜄ᜔) is the Tagalog language edition of Wikipedia, which was launched on 1 December 2003. It has 50,747 articles and is the 107th largest Wikipedia according to the number of articles as of 1 November 2026.

== History ==
The Tagalog Wikipedia was launched on 1 December 2003, as the first Wikipedia in a language of the Philippines.

On 3 February 2011, it got more than 50,000 articles. Bantayan, Cebu became the 10,000th article on 20 October 2007, while Pasko sa Pilipinas (Christmas in the Philippines) became the 15,000th article on 24 December 2007. Localization of software messages through the Betawiki (or translatewiki.net) was finished on 6 February 2009.

In 2011, the Tagalog Wikipedia was part of the WikiHistories fellowship research project of the Wikimedia Foundation. The project tries to capture the triumphs, failures, and daily struggles of the editors working to make the dream of globally shared knowledge a reality.

=== Statistics ===
- 11 March 2008: Pandaka pygmaea – 16,000th article
- 30 June 2008: Silindro (Harmonica) – 17,000th article
- 5 August 2008: Unang Aklat ng mga Macabeo (1 Maccabees) – 18,000th article
- 2 October 2008: Heriyatriko (Geriatrics) – 19,000th article
- 1 November 2008: Anak ng Tao (Son of man) – 20,000th article
- 22 March 2010: Sky Girls – 25,000th article
- 20 July 2010: Charlottenburg-Wilmersdorf – 30,000th article
- 25 October 2010: 1714 Sy – 40,000th article
- 9 November 2010: Ekonometriks (Econometrics) – 45,000th article
- 15 January 2011: Yu-Gi-Oh! Zexal – 50,000th article
- 4 February 2013: Lalaking Vitruvio (Vitruvian Man) – 60,000th article

Due to the mass deletion of very short articles in 2018, the total number of articles dropped drastically to below 50,000. It was only on October 2, 2026 that the number of articles became 50,000 again for the second time with Ameglia (Ameglia) being the 50,000th article.

=== First steps of Tagalog Wikipedia ===
The first article created in the Tagalog Wikipedia (aside from Unang Pahina or the main page) is about Wikipedia. It was created on March 25, 2004. During the times when Tagalog Wikipedia's standards on articles were not strict, the first featured article was Livestrong wristband, but this was replaced by the article kimika (chemistry) in line with the revised standards. But kimika along with the second featured article wiki were eventually replaced by a review process. Technically, the very first featured article that survived the review process is about keso (cheese).

The File:Flutterbye.jpg was the first featured picture for the article paru-parong Viceroy (Viceroy butterfly). Because the file was deleted, it was replaced by File:St Vitus stained glass.jpg for the article Katedral ng San Vitus (St. Vitus Cathedral). The featured picture archive lists File:Viceroy Butterfly.jpg as the first featured picture.

The first three articles that appeared in Alam Ba Ninyo? (Did you know?) were web browser (en), Wikang Bulgaro (Bulgarian language) and Pilipinas (Philippines). There was a section entitled On This Day at the main page on 2 April 2008, but this was hidden on 3 May 2008, because of lack of contributors of this section.

== Characteristics ==
The Tagalog Wikipedia has several characteristics which define it differently from other language editions of Wikipedia. According to Michael Tan, a Filipino anthropologist and Philippine Daily Inquirer columnist, the Tagalog Wikipedia greatly depends on the UP Diksyonaryong Filipino for basic definitions. Though focused on the Tagalog language, it has pages that helps non-Tagalog speakers on anything related about the online project.

=== Coverage ===
The Tagalog Wikipedia has significant coverage of topics related to the Philippines, as well as anime and manga-related topics. In 2010, GMA News and Public Affairs released a report criticizing the Tagalog Wikipedia's lack of science-related articles.

=== Project name ===
According to Wikipedians from the Tagalog and English Wikipedias, the Tagalog Wikipedia also represents the Filipino language due to the Tagalog Wikipedia being in the Manila dialect of Tagalog According to the Vibal Foundation, a foundation that started WikiPilipinas, the Tagalog Wikipedia is different from WikiFilipino, the wiki that they manage because WikiFilipino uses Filipino language while the Tagalog Wikipedia uses Tagalog language. The difference or sameness of Tagalog and Filipino sparked a debate among Tagalog Wikipedians about the name of the project. This debate was mentioned in an article by DILA (Defenders of the Indigenous Languages of the Archipelago), an organization that defends indigenous languages of the Philippines.

== Comparison with other Philippine-based language editions ==
Compared to the other Philippine-based language editions of Wikipedia, the Tagalog Wikipedia has significantly fewer articles than the Cebuano Wikipedia, which currently has more than 6,116,000 articles, and the Waray Wikipedia, which has more than 1,267,000 articles, as the majority of the articles in those two languages were initially created by the Lsjbot.

The Tagalog Wikipedia has an article depth of 138.99, compared to 4.32 for the Waray Wikipedia and 2.32 for the Cebuano Wikipedia, as of 1 November 2026. By active users, it has 304, compared to 245 for the Cebuano Wikipedia and 74 for the Waray language edition.
