= Uppland Runic Inscription 896 =

Coordinates: 59°51′31″N 17°37′53″E

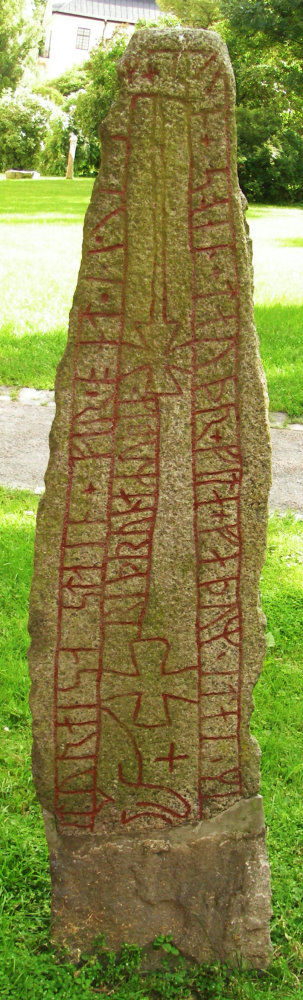
U 896 at the University of Uppsala.

Uppland Runic Inscription 896 or U 896 is the Rundata catalog listing for a Viking Age memorial runestone originally located at Håga in the historic province of Uppland, Sweden, but is now at the Universitetsparken ("University Park") of Uppsala University.

== Description ==
The inscription on U 896 consists of runic text in the younger futhark within a text band along the edge of a tall and narrow runestone, which is made of granite and is 1.7 meters in height, with a second text band within the first on the left side. Two crosses are enclosed by the text bands. The bottom portion of the stone is missing. The inscription is tentatively classified due to its damage as being carved in runestone style Pr1, which is also known as Ringerike style. Inscriptions with this classification have runic text bands with attached serpent or beast heads depicted in profile. In 1867 this runestone, along with U 489 from Morby and U 1011 from Örby, was exhibited in the Exposition Universelle in Paris. When it was returned to Sweden, the stone was raised at Uppsala University.

The runic text, which is missing in one section of the damaged runestone, states that the stone was raised in memory of a man probably named Eyndar, and was probably sponsored by the man's parents. The text states that the deceased died i hvitavadhum, an Old Norse phrase which is usually translated as meaning "in christening robes." Other runestones using this phrase include the now-lost U 243 in Molnby, U 364 in Gådersta, U 613 in Torsätra, U 699 in Amnö, U 1036 in Tensta, and U Fv1973;194 at the Uppsala Cathedral. The text also indicates that the deceased probably died in Denmark. Other inscriptions mentioning Denmark include Öl 1 in Karlevi, Sö Fv1948;289 in Aspa bro, U 699 in Amnö, DR 41 and DR 42 in Jelling, DR 133 in Skivum, and N 239 in Stangeland.

The text also states in the inner text band that Reð runaʀ Øpiʀ or that "Öpir arranged the runes." The runemaster Öpir, which is the normalized name, was active in the Uppland region from the late 11th to the early 12th centuries. The same phrase is also used on U 940 in Torget by Öpir, and other inscriptions stating that they were arranged include U 913 in Brunnby and U 961 in Vaksala. U 896 and U 940 are stylistically unlike any of the other inscriptions signed by Öpir, and it has been suggested that these two inscriptions along with U 1022 represent works from the beginning of Öpir's career.

== Inscription ==

=== Transliteration of the runes into Latin characters ===
... [l]itu raisa stain + fir ' ont * iy--m + sun + sain + tauþr + fita+faþum ' i tai'ma... ... riþ runaʀ ubiʀ

=== Transcription into Old Norse ===
... letu ræisa stæin fyr and Øy[nda]ʀ(?), sun sinn, dauðr [i] hvitavaðum i Danma[rku](?) ... Reð runaʀ Øpiʀ.

=== Translation in English ===
... had the stone raised for the spirit of Eyndar(?), their son, (who) died in christening robes in Denmark(?) ... Öpir arranged the runes.

== See also ==
- List of runestones
