= Susning.nu =

Former Swedish language wiki

- Logo of Susning.nu
- Website type: Wiki
- Available in: Swedish
- Owner: Lars Aronsson
- Website: susning.nu
- Commercial: No
- Launched: 1 October 2001; 24 years ago
- Current status: defunct

Susning.nu (in English literally meaning "clue.now") was a Swedish language wiki website created by Lars Aronsson (also the founder of Project Runeberg) in 2001 and active until 2009. In its first three years, the website ran as an open wiki that anyone could edit. Susning did not have a pronounced ambition and could be compared in scope to Everything2; Aronsson's stated original aim for Susning was "to make it into whatever the users want it to be". As such, Susning was an encyclopedia, a dictionary, and a discussion forum about any concept of interest to its users. Because of this, Susning grew and became Sweden's biggest and the world's next biggest wiki.

At its peak in April 2004, Susning had over 60,000 articles on various topics, which was more than any other Swedish wiki at that time. During its first few years, it was in direct competition with the Swedish Wikipedia. However, because of the website's popularity and open nature, Susning was highly affected by vandals, eventually leading to the complete shutdown of the project. In attempt at preventing vandalism, many efforts were made by Susning's founder Lars Aronsson, which were mostly unsuccessful. Users who regularly edited at Susning were called "susare".

== History ==
Susning.nu was started on August 31, 2001, by Lars Aronsson and functioned as part of his personal website. It changed to Susning.nu on September 29, and was released on October 1. During October that year, Susning.nu was indexed by the bigger web search engines, and the article collection firmly increased. In one year, Susning.nu grew with 10,000 articles, and more features were added. Among them were link statistics for all pages, and date searching which automatically generated dates and search links in several languages. The first edit war broke out on July 31, 2002.

Susning used a heavily modified version of UseModWiki as its wiki engine. Its domain name .nu, which belongs to the island of Niue in Oceania but which is sold primarily to foreigners, was chosen as a domain hack, because nu means "now" in Swedish (as well as Danish and Dutch). "Skaffa dig en susning.nu" was the slogan of Susning and translates to "Get a clue.now". (The standard top level domain for Sweden is .se.)

=== Issues with vandalism ===
A significant difference from the Swedish Wikipedia was that Susning did not have any voluntary administrators who could assist in blocking other users; the only person who could do that on Susning was Lars Aronsson. As Susning grew, the issue with vandalism became bigger. In December 2003, Susning was affected by a vandal who had automatized their activity through a script. In just a few minutes, thousands of articles were deleted. Several users were forced to spend hours restoring them. The issues increased even further with vandals who added pornographic images and made the site inaccessible. The issues with vandalism were practically going on daily. To aid removal and discovery of vandalism, a "karma system" was added on February 22, 2004. The system derailed fairly soon, as the karma only could decrease. Because of this, even the most established "susare" were affected by bad karma. The karma system was shut down on March 25, 2004.

As a last attempt at preventing vandalism, the ability to see images was shut down entirely on April 5, 2004. However, a couple of days later it was possible to add images from certain chosen domain names. Due to a bug in the system, there were ways to evade this, which the vandals utilised. The bug was fixed on April 15, 2004, but a few minutes later that day, all editing on Susning.nu was shut down. Aronsson announced that the editing abilities would be shut down until a solution to the vandalism issues had been found, and that a password system would be imposed.

=== Demise and closure ===
After the imposing of the password lock, Susning became a significantly less active project, and a dozen users made almost all edits. In March 2004, before the password system was imposed, articles were saved approximately 36,000 times; by May, this had been reduced to 1,600 times. On May 11, 2004, editing on Susning.nu was temporarily opened for non-logged-in users, but after just 18 hours, vandalism had once again become such a big problem that non-logged-in editing was once again shut down. In March 2006, editing by non-logged-in users was opened on Sunday afternoons between 12:00–16:00. A year later, editing between 06:00–07:00 each day was enabled as well. Overall, this worked well but with a bit of vandalism.

In mid-2008, the website was affected by a persistent spammer who used proxy servers to spam different articles with English advertisement links. In April 2009, this forced Aronsson to remove the daily editing abilities between 06:00–07:00. The editing abilities during Sunday afternoons, however, continued to be open despite recurring spam attacks. By this time, very few users were still creating and editing articles on the website, which was shut down entirely in mid-August 2009; no reason for this was ever announced.

== Reception ==
=== Opinions ===
One opinion aired was that Susning's status as a one-man project on the technical side was a big obstacle. Some argued that shared responsibility of the site would likely have meant a higher rate of innovation, greater predictability and better communication between technicians and "susare". Lars Aronsson clarified that he saw Susning.nu as his own project and that he was not interested in letting others control it. After imposing editing on Sunday afternoons only, Aronsson himself used Susning mostly as a logbook where he saved links regarding, for example, Google and Wikipedia.

=== Advertisement ===
Unlike its main competitor, the Swedish Wikipedia, Susning.nu placed advertisements on some of its articles. It also had no license agreement, which meant that the contributions remained copyrighted by their submitters (the right to modify was said to be implicit in the site's function). This in turn meant that third parties, such as Wikipedia editors, could not legally use Susning.nu materials contributed by others without permission. It also meant that Susning.nu depended solely on Lars Aronsson's willingness to continue the project.

== See also ==
- Enciclopedia Libre
- List of online encyclopedias
