= Wikimedia Portugal =

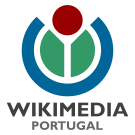
- Established: 2009 (16 years ago)

Wikimedia Portugal, officially Associação Wikimedia Portugal is a Portuguese non profit association, recognized by the Wikimedia Foundation as a Wikimedia chapter operating in Portugal. It was established in 21 September 2009, in Guimarães.

The association aims to "to contribute to the general dissemination of knowledge and culture by encouraging the gathering, creation and distribution of freely licensed content. To promote and support the projects of the non-profit organization Wikimedia Foundation, based in the United States of America, with emphasis on projects in the Portuguese language. To establish and maintain relationships and to exchange information with other public and private, national and foreign entities, especially in the Portuguese-speaking countries and the Portuguese communities abroad."

== Activities ==
In April 2010, it started the first Wikipedia Academy in Portugal, co-organized by FEUP, in Porto.

In March 2017 the association organized in Portugal an Edit-a-thon to celebrate International Women's Day, as part of the international initiative Art+Feminism. In January 2020, it organized the first national Wikimedian conference, WikiCon Portugal.

It organizes since 2011 photographic competitions with the objective to increase participation and representation of Portuguese built and natural heritage on Wikimedia projects. In 2011, it organized the first edition of Wiki Loves Monuments in Portugal, with the support of IGESPAR and IHRU. That first edition obtained more than 16 thousand submissions out of a total of 165 thousand photos, helping the competition earn a Guinness World Record, as the largest photo competition in the world.

In 2022, it started a collaboration with Antena 1, the public broadcaster radio station, named Wiki Loves Música Portuguesa, improving the content of Wikipedia related to Portuguese music.
