= Swedish Wikipedia =

Swedish-language edition of Wikipedia

- Swedish version of the Wikipedia logo (Swedish: The free encyclopedia)

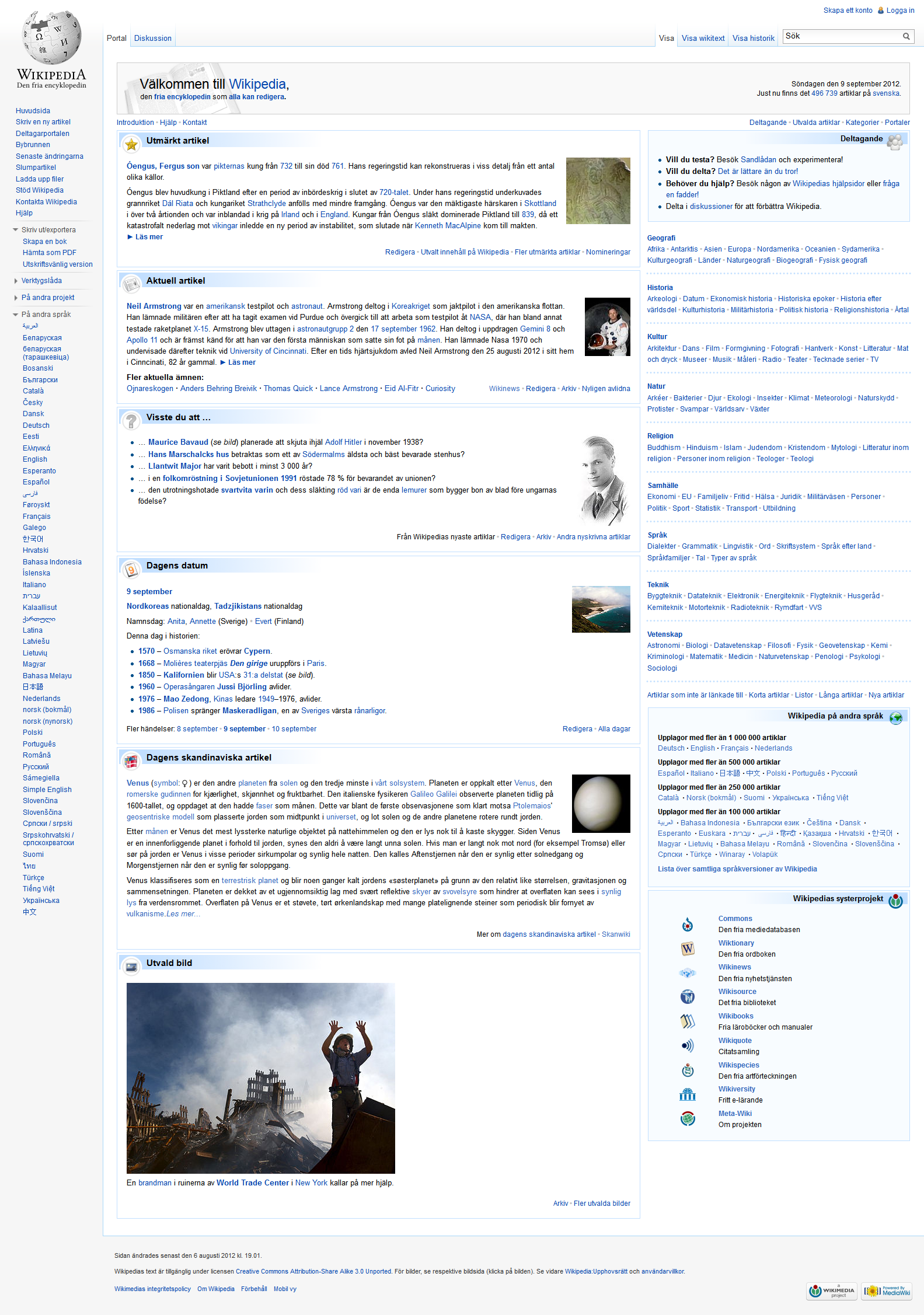
- Screenshot The Main Page of the Swedish Wikipedia on 9 September 2012
- Website type: Online encyclopedia
- Available in: Swedish
- Headquarters: Wikimedia Sweden
- Owner: Wikimedia Foundation
- Founders: Linus Tolke, Dan Koehl
- Editor: Swedish Wikipedia community
- Website: sv.wikipedia.org
- Commercial: No
- Registration: Optional
- Users: 1.09 million
- Launched: 21 May 2001; 25 years ago
- Current status: Active
- Content license: Creative Commons Attribution/ Share-Alike 4.0 (most text also dual-licensed under GFDL); Media licensing varies
- Written in: MediaWiki (PHP)

The Swedish Wikipedia (Swedish: Svenskspråkiga Wikipedia) is the Swedish-language edition of the free content online encyclopedia Wikipedia, started in 2001.

Swedish Wikipedia is the largest reference work in Swedish history. It is consistently ranked as the most visited or one of the most visited Swedish-language websites. Along with the rest of Wikipedia, content quality assessments have gradually improved.

With 2,630,777 articles in a depth of 19.14, it is the fifth largest Wikipedia by article count. It counts 4,560 active users, including 63 one year-elected administrators. As with other editions, since the 2010s, editing has been assisted by bots. In 2014, it topped relatively as the second largest after English Wikipedia. As of 2026, it ranked as the 24th most visited Wikipedia language version.

Shortly after the creation of the English Wikipedia on 15 January 2001, more language editions were discussed. The Swedish Wikipedia was started on 21 May 2001 as the 4th Wikipedia edition. Instrumental Swedish co-founders were Linus Tolke, who partook in its prototype launch, and Dan Koehl, first system operator who pioneered the contemporary platform, corpus, and community including the "thing", which set a precedent as the earliest form of arbitration committee in the history of Wikipedia, effectively making Swedish Wikipedia the first independent franchise not directly controlled by Jimmy Wales.

The Swedish Wikipedia is owned by the Wikimedia Foundation, an American nonprofit organisation, along with the other language editions. It is supported locally by the national chapter Wikimedia Sweden, headquartered in Stockholm, founded in 2007 by Lennart Guldbrandsson, and Lars Aronsson.

== History ==
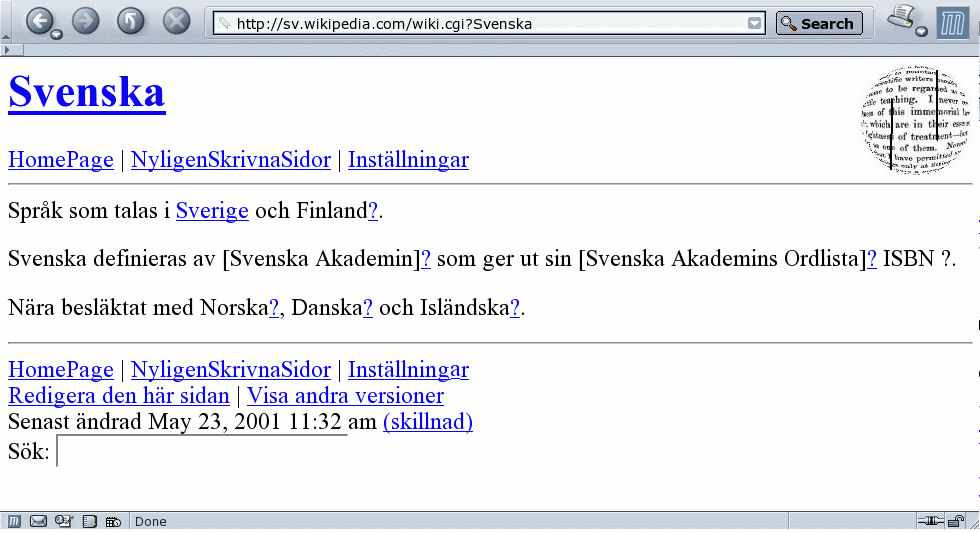
Screenshot of sv.wikipedia.com 23 May 2001, using the prototype "Phase I" UseModWiki software

External image
- Debut of contemporary Swedish Wikipedia (2002)
- via The Internet Archive
- sv.wikipedia.org Screenshot of sv.wikipedia.org 6 December 2002, using the contemporary "Phase III" MediaWiki software installed 1 December 2002

Wikipedia in English was founded 15 January 2001 by Jimmy Wales and Larry Sanger. Soon, more language versions were discussed, including with foreign language speakers. The decision to create the Swedish Wikipedia is estimated to around April 2001, then as the 4th language.

Jimmy Wales set up the Swedish Wikipedia on 21 May 2001 at sv.wikipedia.com as Wikipedia's 4th language version. All of Wikipedia was still in its early stage in terms of web development, translations, as well as establishing the online encyclopedia community. Jimmy Wales delegated the creation to two Swedes who had previously been active on English Wikipedia: initially in 2001 to Linus Tolke, a Swedish systems architect tasked with translating the prototype software, and subsequently in 2002 to Dan Koehl, previously creator of one of the first online encyclopedias in 1995, who concluded the translations and whom Jimmy Wales appointed as the Swedish Wikipedia's first system operator.

=== Establishment ===
The prototype "Phase I" UseModWiki software for sv.wikipedia.com was translated in May 2001 by Linus Tolke and the conclusive "Phase III" MediaWiki contemporary platform under the since web address sv.wikipedia.org in November 2002 by Dan Koehl. The "Phase III" PHP-engined MediaWiki Swedish interface premiered on sv.wikipedia.org 1 December 2002, where the Swedish Wikipedia has remained ever since, becoming the foundation for subsequent, contemporary versions.

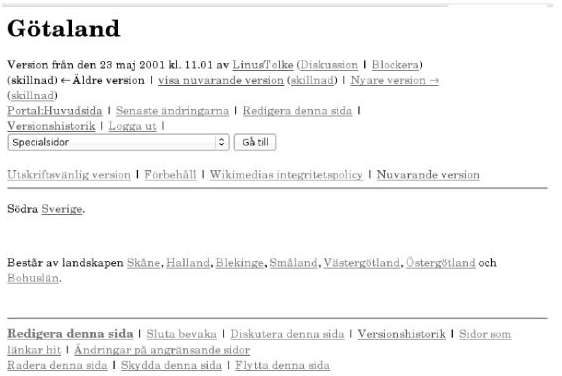
The article sv:Götaland, first edited 23 May 2001 using the prototype "Phase I" UseModWiki software, may be the first article on Swedish Wikipedia. Image from Så funkar Wikipedia ("How Wikipedia Works"), the first historiography on Swedish Wikipedia published in 2008 by Lennart Guldbrandsson, the first president of Wikimedia Sweden.

After initiating prototype translations and having started a few articles, Linus Tolke left, while Dan Koehl translated the concluding software foundation and went on to pioneer the fundamental corpus of articles and categorisation. After the first couple of one sentence stubs by Linus Tolke, Dan Koehl remained the sole editor until the end of 2002. Besides editing, Dan Koehl set up the early organisational, maintenance and community functions, such as the Swedish Wikipedia:Meta mainsite, Bybrunnen user forums, sabotage deterrence, and called to the first Tinget. This wiki "thing" of 24 November 2002 became the first instance of something akin to an arbitration committee on any Wikipedia language version, effectively making the Swedish Wikipedia the first decentralised franchise while the rest of Wikipedia was still under Jimmy Wales' direct personal supervision.

=== Early history ===
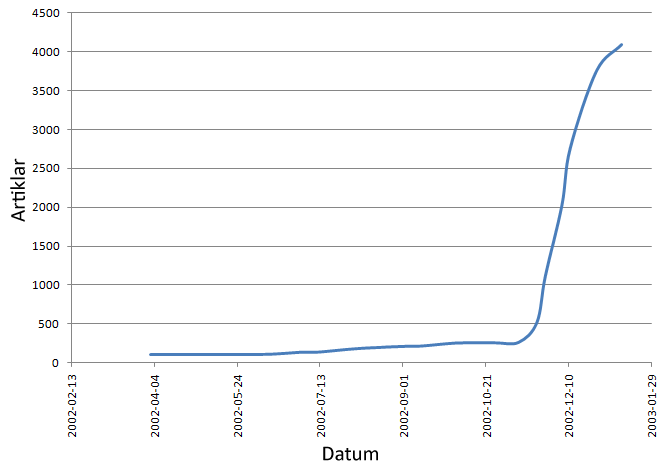
Article increase (2002-2003), after the implementation of advertisements on Susning.nu

Article increase (2001-2024)

In the early 2000s, the Swedish Wikipedia's prototype instantiation functioned as a small, foreign-franchised competitor to the independently Swedish UseModWiki Susning.nu created 1 October 2001 by Lars Aronsson, inspired by the English Wikipedia. However, due to the founder's introduction of advertising on the website from 20 November 2002, its contributors decided to gradually abandon it for the Swedish Wikipedia. Although Susning.nu became the world's second largest wiki on 28 May 2003, in April 2004, its editing features were closed down to all but a handful of users, which further increased the flow to the Swedish Wikipedia. On 14 January 2005, Wikipedia's article count surpassed that of Susning.nu. Susning.nu was shut down entirely in August 2009.

Editing collaborations with other interintelligable Scandinavian languages editions has been organised by the Skanwiki project.

In March 2006, the Swedish newspaper Svenska Dagbladet published a comparative evaluation of the Swedish Wikipedia, Susning.nu and the online version of Nationalencyklopedin. The evaluation was done by giving a selection of articles to independent subject matter experts for grading. While Nationalencyklopedin came out on top with respect to factuality and neutrality, the Swedish Wikipedia received a good overall grade and came out on top with respect to being up to date and having a broad coverage, also including popular culture subjects.

On 21 May 2026, Swedish Wikipedia celebrated its 25th anniversary.

=== Wikimedia Sweden ===
Since the beginning, the Swedish Wikipedia like the other language editions is owned by the Wikimedia Foundation, an American nonprofit organisation, located in the United States. It is supported locally by the national chapter Wikimedia Sweden, since 2007. Wikimedia Sweden was founded by Lennart Guldbrandsson, and Lars Aronsson, the latter from the former Susning.nu after it declined. Lennart Guldbrandsson was appointed its first president 2007-2010 at the first meeting at the Swedish Museum of Natural History.

=== Bot-created articles ===
On 27 September 2012, the wiki reached 500,000 articles. On 15 June 2013 it reached 1,000,000 articles and rose from 8th to 5th place. This was largely due to a community project in which bots produced articles for all existing species of plants and animals. When finished, the project had created more than a million articles, most being short and sourced through available online databases. In 2014 about half of Swedish Wikipedia's articles were created by a single bot, Lsjbot. During 2015 and 2016, Lsjbot wrote more than 1 million geographical articles, increasing the number of articles to nearly 3.8 million until it stopped in November 2016. While this practice allowed the Swedish Wikipedia to become the second-largest worldwide, article quality suffered from a lack of sourcing, shallow articles, duplicates, and outdated information. Editors' opinions changed, and article deletions started outpacing new creations. After peaking in 2016 at 3.8 million articles, Swedish Wikipedia had fewer than 3.3 million articles in March 2021, and as of December 2021, the count had dropped below 2.8 million articles.

== Gallery ==
Swedish Wikipedia's 500,000 article logo (September 2012)

Swedish Wikipedia's 1,000,000 article logo (June 2013)

Swedish Wikipedia's 2,000,000 article logo (September 2015)

Swedish Wikipedia's 3,000,000 article logo (April 2016)

== See also ==
- Finnish Wikipedia
- Danish Wikipedia
- Norwegian Wikipedia
- Nationalencyklopedin
