= Lsjbot =

Wikipedia article creation bot

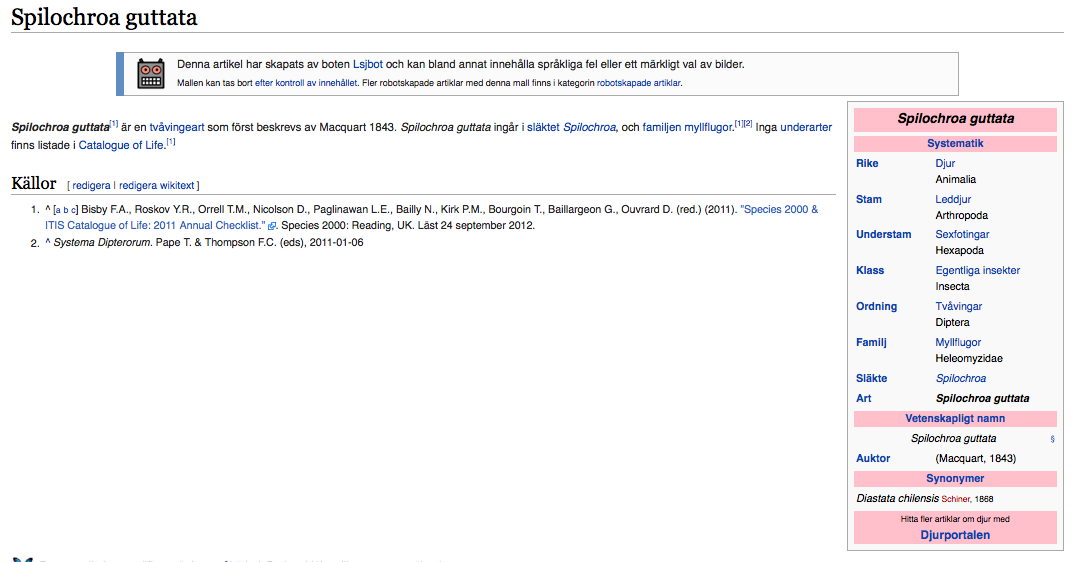
- A typical article generated by Lsjbot
- Developer: Sverker Johansson
- Written in: C#
- Type: Internet bot
- Website: Lsjbot on Swedish Wikipedia

Lsjbot is an automated Wikipedia article-creating program, or Wikipedia bot, developed by Sverker Johansson for the Swedish Wikipedia. The bot primarily focuses on articles about living organisms and geographical entities (such as rivers, dams, and mountains).

According to its description page on the Swedish Wikipedia, Lsjbot was active in the Swedish and Waray Wikipedias and is currently active in the Cebuano Wikipedia, and has created most Wikipedia articles in those languages (between 80% and 99% of the total).

During 2020, Lsjbot was only performing maintenance on the Cebuano Wikipedia, with no major article creation projects underway.

== History ==
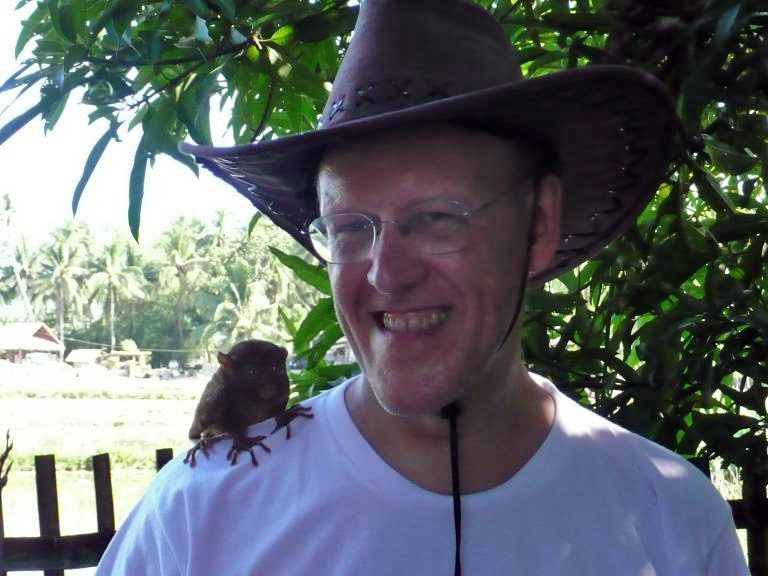
Sverker Johansson, the developer of Lsjbot, shown with a tarsier

The bot is implemented in the programming language C#. It is not based on a large language model (LLM).

The program was responsible for 2.7 million articles as of 2014 (at a rate of 10,000 articles per day), and 9.5 million articles as of January 2019 (at a rate of 4,000 per day), two-thirds of which appear in the Cebuano language Wikipedia (the native language of Johansson's wife); the other third appear in the Swedish Wikipedia.

Johannson started using bots to edit in 2011 after four years as a manual editor. On 15 June 2013, the Swedish Wikipedia hit one million articles, the eighth language on Wikipedia to reach that goal. The millionth article was created by Lsjbot – which at that point had created 454,000 articles, almost half of the entire article count of the Swedish Wikipedia. Lsjbot was also responsible for helping the Swedish Wikipedia become the second edition of Wikipedia to reach 2 million articles, which as of 2024 is the fifth largest edition of Wikipedia behind English, Cebuano, German and French.

In February 2020, Vice reported that Lsjbot was responsible for over 24 million of 29.5 million edits at Cebuano Wikipedia, now the world's second largest Wikipedia, with bots comprising all but five of the site's top 35 editors and no human editors in the top 10. However, Lsjbot is no longer creating new articles at the Swedish and Waray Wikipedias. Sverker Johansson explained that "opinions shifted" within the Swedish Wikipedia community and Waray editors were unable to form a consensus about the automatic creation of articles.

== Media coverage ==
Its operation has generated some criticism, from those who suggest the short articles lack meaningful content and a human touch. The Sydney Morning Herald compared the bot to Phil Parker, allegedly the most published author in human history, who has published over 200,000 books, each of which is completed in less than an hour using computers. Popular Science compared the bot to the announcement in July 2014 by the Associated Press that it planned to use bots to write articles. Johansson countered attacks on his methods by appealing to problems of gender bias on Wikipedia, noting that if the bot does not write articles, "otherwise they're mainly written by young, white, male nerds and reflect male interests."
