= Nationalencyklopedin =

Comprehensive contemporary Swedish-language encyclopedia

Nationalencyklopedin Ett uppslagsverk på vetenskaplig grund utarbetat på initiativ av Statens kulturråd
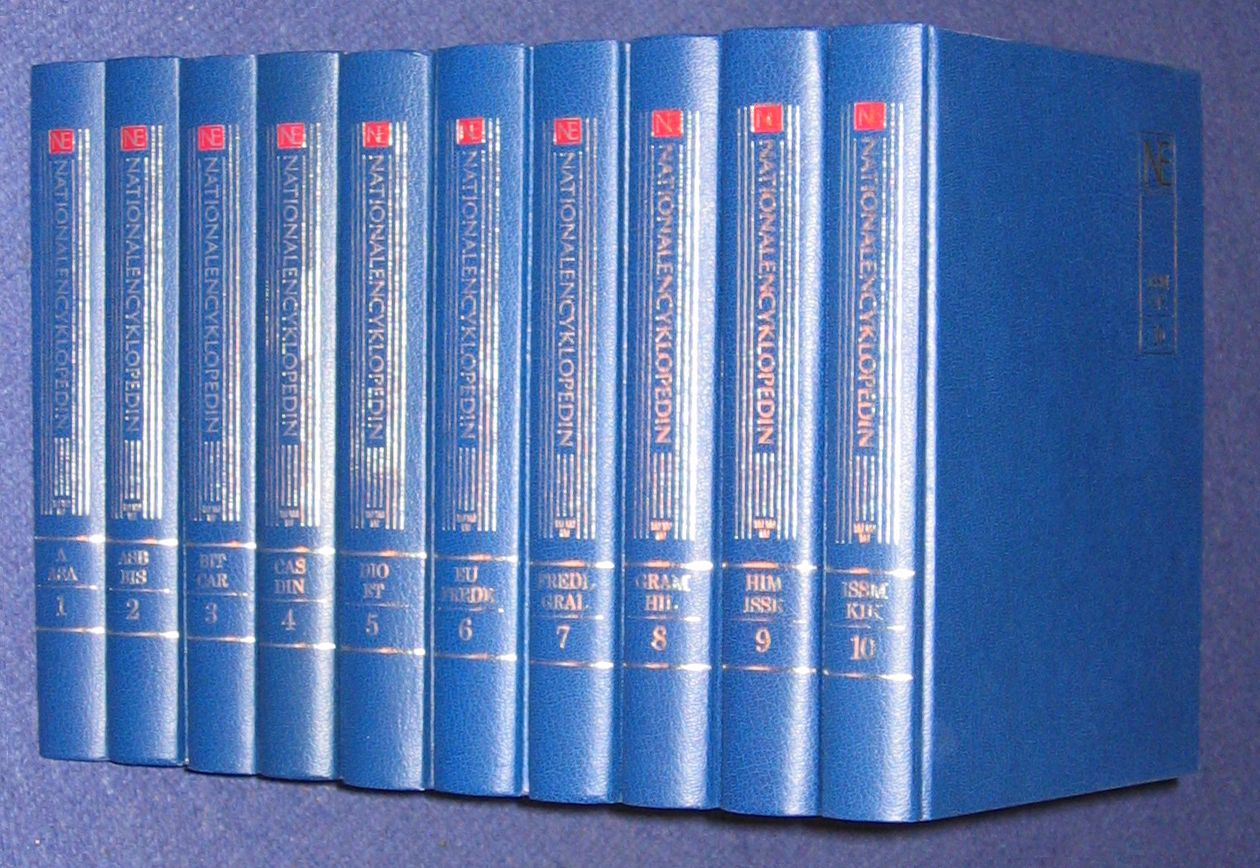
- Volumes 1–10 of 20, 1989–1996
- Language: Swedish
- Subject: General
- Publication place: Sweden
- ISBN: 91-70-24619-X
- OCLC: 185256473
- Website: www.ne.se/info/

Nationalencyklopedin (Swedish: [natɧʊˈnɑ̂ːlɛnsʏklʊpɛˌdiːn]; "The National Encyclopedia" in English), abbreviated NE, is a comprehensive contemporary Swedish-language encyclopedia with several hundred thousand articles. It is available both online and via a printed version.

== History ==
The project was initiated in 1980 when a government committee suggested that negotiations be initiated with various publishers. A loan from the Government of Sweden of 17 million Swedish krona, which was repaid by December 1990, provided funding.

In August 1985, Bra Böcker in Höganäs became the publisher responsible for the project. The project specifications were for a modern reference work based on a scientific paradigm incorporating gender and environmental issues.

Pre-orders for the work were unprecedented; before the first volume was published in December 1989, 54,000 customers had ordered the encyclopedia. The last volume came out in 1996, with three supplemental volumes in 2000. 160,000 copies had been sold as of 2004.

Associated with the Nationalencyklopedin project are also:

- NE:s Ordbok, a dictionary in three volumes (1995–1996)
- NE:s Årsband, complementary volumes concerning current events and fast changing information distributed annually since 1997
- NE:s Sverigeatlas, an atlas of Sweden (1998)
- NE:s Världsatlas, a world atlas (1998)
- NE-spelet, a quiz game with 8,000 questions (1999)

In 1997, the first digital form of the encyclopedia was released on six CD-ROMs (later on DVD as well), and in 2000 as an Internet subscription service. The online version contains the dictionary as well as an updated version of the original encyclopedia. It has 356,000 entries, 183,000 of which are encyclopedic articles. The service has been completed with several features not available in the printed version, such as a Swedish–English dictionary.

In 2018, after a decision to remove the authors' names from the byline of online articles, SVT reported the encyclopedia may be forced to remove thousands of articles due to copyright infringement unless the authors' names are added back.

== See also ==
- Nordisk familjebok (1876–1957)
- Swedish Wikipedia
- List of online encyclopedias
