= Visäte =

11th century Swedish runemaster

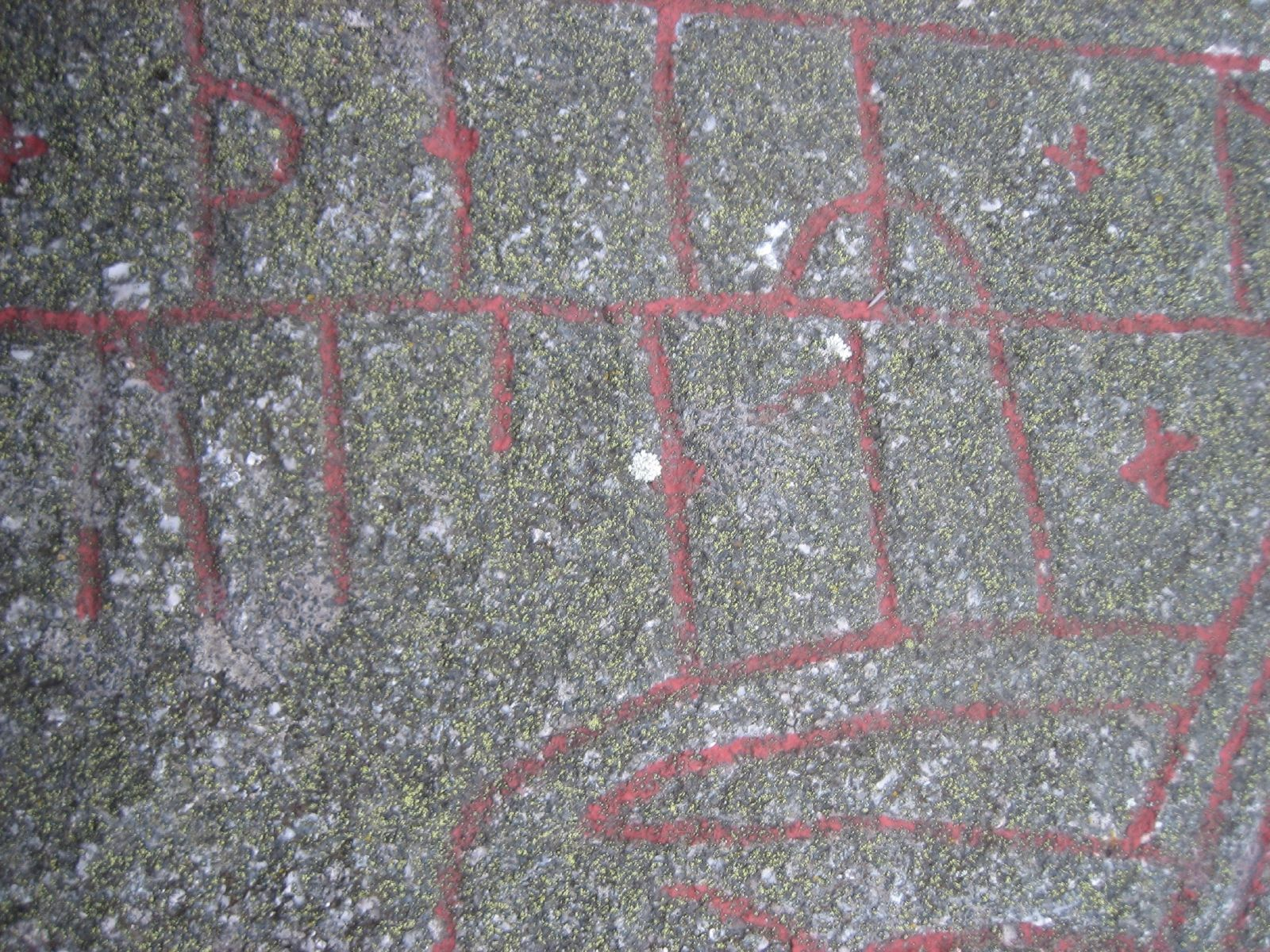
The name Visäte on the Granby Runestone.

Visäte (Old Norse: Víseti, Véseti) was a runemaster who was active during the last half of the eleventh century in southern Uppland, Sweden.

== Work ==
Most early medieval Scandinavians were probably literate in runes, and most people probably carved messages on pieces of bone and wood. However, it was difficult to make runestones, and in order to master it one also needed to be a stonemason. During the 11th century, when most runestones were raised, there were a few professional runemasters. The runemaster Visäte is known for his inscriptions which are classified as being carved in runestone styles Pr3 and Pr4, which is also known as the Urnes style. Inscriptions in runestone style Pr3 and Pr4 are characterized by slim and stylized animals that are interwoven into tight patterns. The animal heads are typically seen in profile with slender almond-shaped eyes and upwardly curled appendages on the noses and the necks.

Uppland's longest runic inscription, runestone U 337 in Granby, has Visäte's signature. Seven other surviving runestones that are signed by Visäte include U 74 in Husby, U 208 in Råcksta, U 236 in Lindö, U 454 in Kumla, U 669 in Kålsta, U 862 in Säva, and U Fv1946;258 in Fällbro. Rundata lists over twenty additional runestones that have been attributed to him based on stylistic analysis.

== Gallery ==
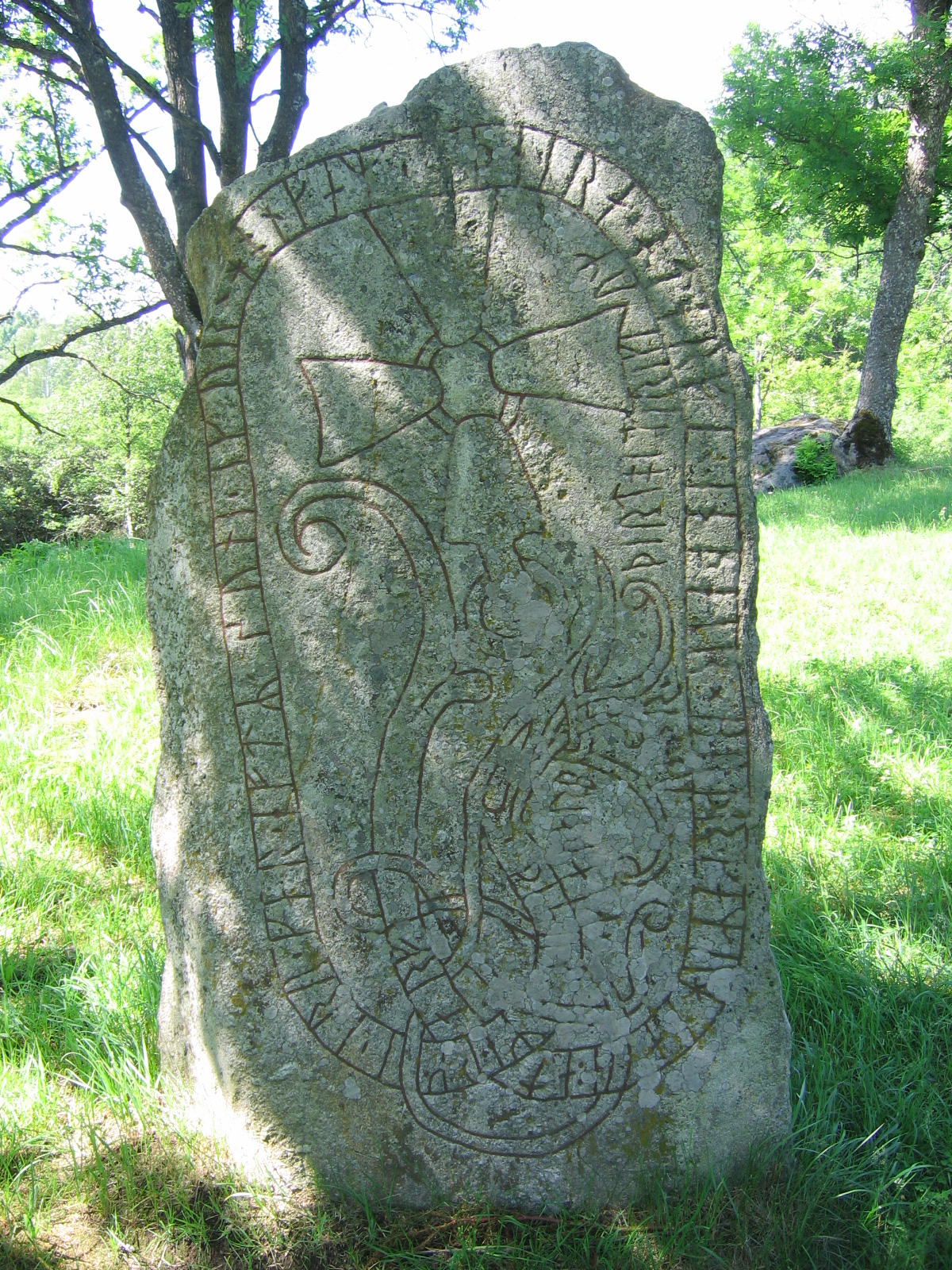
U 73, one of the Greece Runestones, is attributed to Visäte.

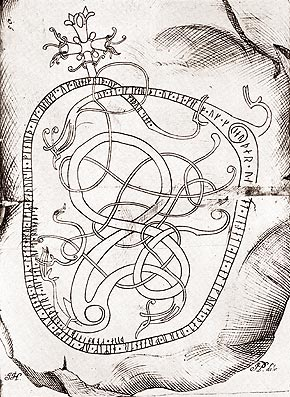
The Granby Runestone, U 337, the longest runic inscription in Uppland, was made by Visäte. Drawing by Peringskiöld.

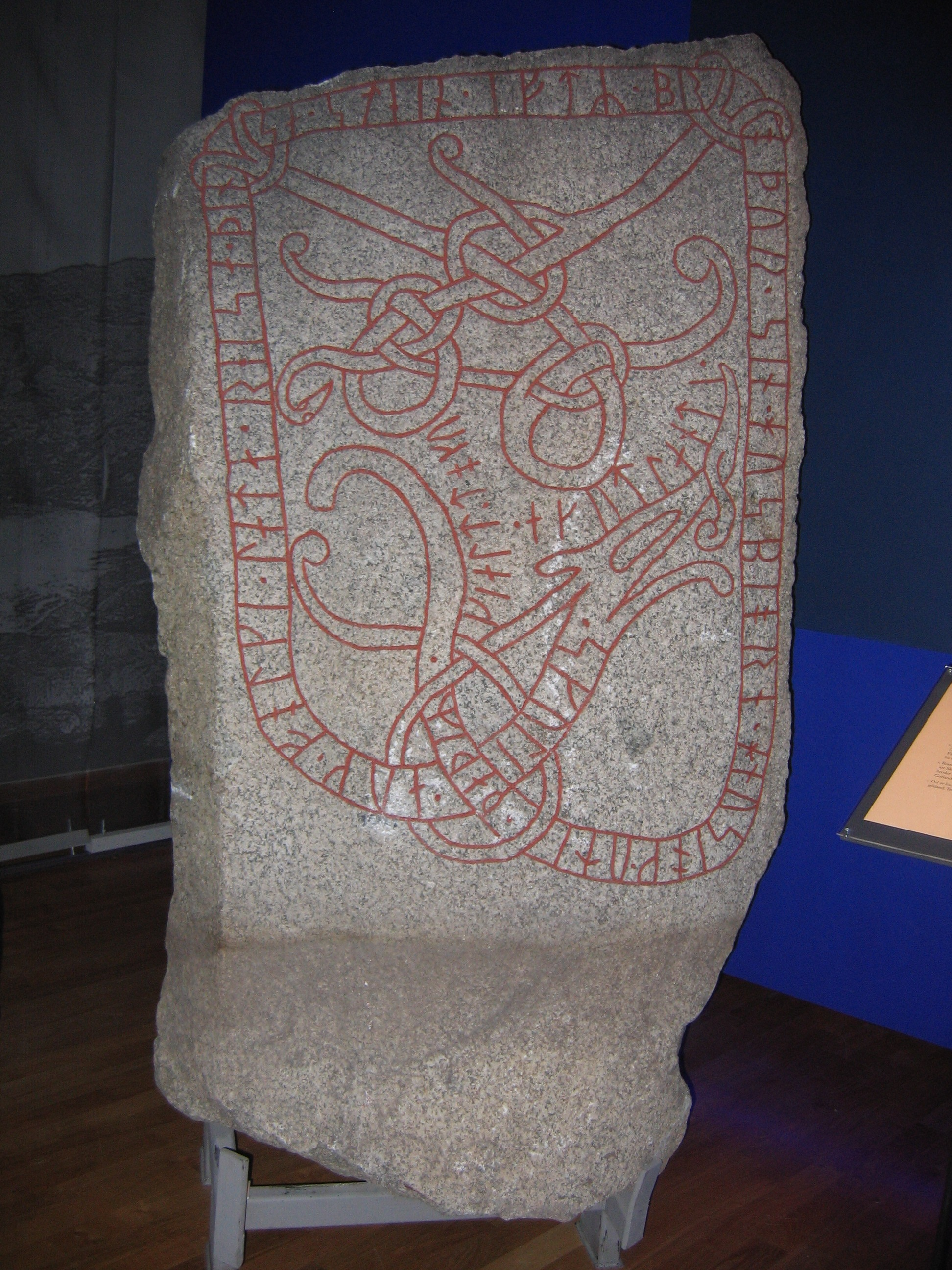
The Torsätra runestone, U 614, is attributed to Visäte.

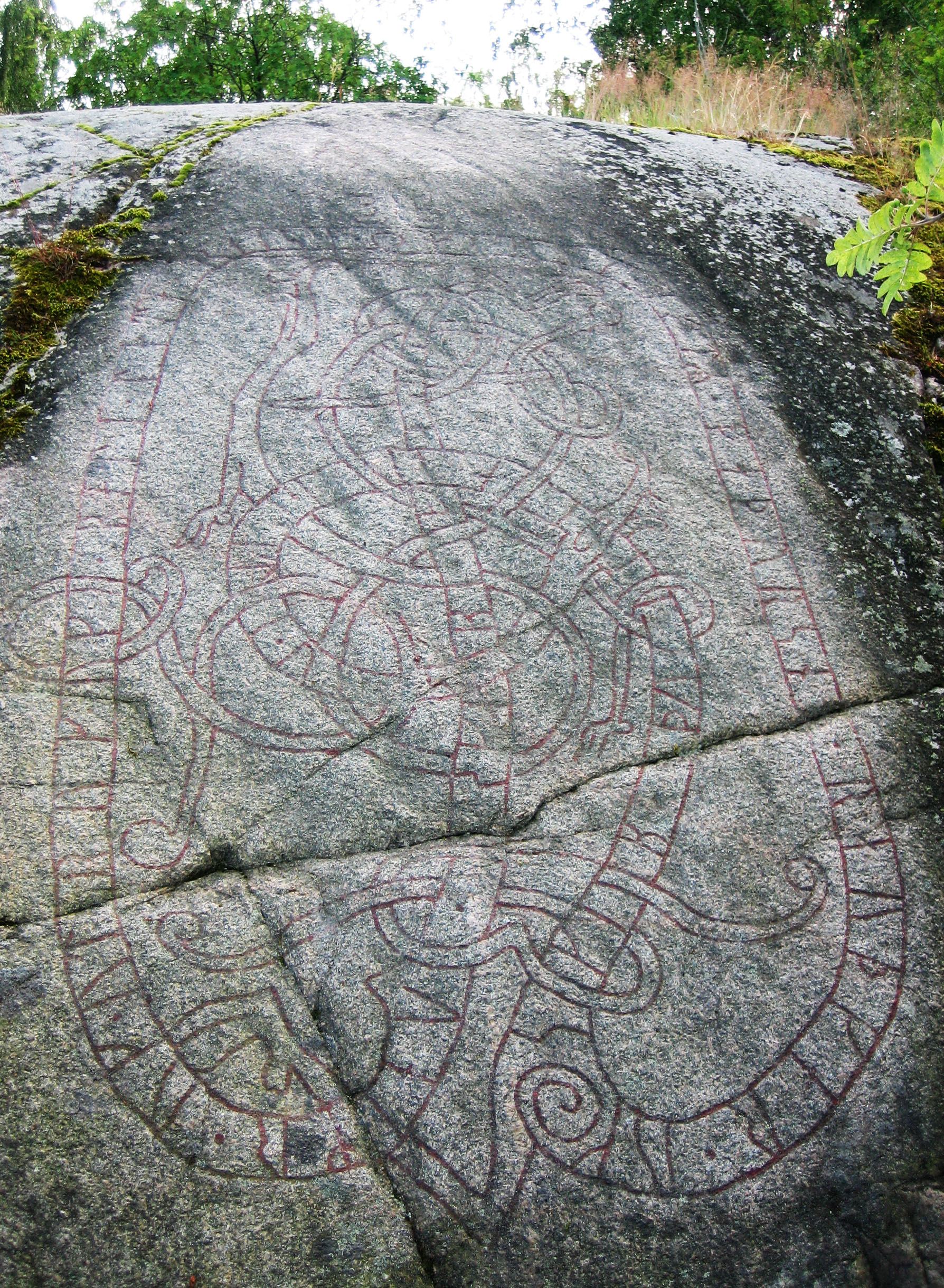
Uppland Runic Inscription Fv1946;258 is signed by Visäte.

== Other sources ==
- The article Visäte in Nationalencyklopedin (1996).
