= Waray Wikipedia =

Waray-language edition of Wikipedia

- Website type: Internet encyclopedia project
- Available in: Waray
- Headquarters: Miami, Florida
- Owner: Wikimedia Foundation
- Website: war.wikipedia.org
- Commercial: No
- Registration: Optional
- Launched: September 25, 2005; 21 years ago
- Content license: Creative Commons Attribution/ Share-Alike 4.0 (most text also dual-licensed under GFDL); Media licensing varies

The Waray Wikipedia is the Waray language edition of Wikipedia. It is hosted on servers run by the Wikimedia Foundation since September 25, 2005. As of October 7, 2026, this Wikipedia has 1,267,000 articles and is the 17th-largest Wikipedia. The Waray Wikipedia has very few active users (80) and instead owes its large size to automatically generated articles created by bots, most of them by Sverker Johansson's Lsjbot.

Waray (or Waray-Waray) is spoken by approximately 3.6 million people in the Eastern Visayas region of the Philippines. The Wikipedia was launched on September 25, 2005 and now has more than 1,000,000 articles, being thus in sixth place for size historically.

== History ==
The Waray Wikipedia was first organized in Tacloban on September 25, 2005, by Harvey Fiji. The wiki had a small number of contributors, with fewer than ten editors per month until April 2009. The first meet-up of editors took place in January 2013 in Tacloban.

By early 2011 the Waray Wikipedia had attracted notice for including more than twice as many articles as the Tagalog Wikipedia, which is based on the principal language of the Philippines. This discrepancy was explained by the very large number of articles added automatically by bots, with no direct human input. By early June 2014 the Waray Wikipedia had attained a very high article count of 1 million, but a very low article depth of less than 3. Article depth is an attempt to measure the collaborative quality of articles, based on the number of edits per article.

According to automatically updated Wikimedia data, as of October 7, 2026, the Waray Wikipedia has 2,870,739 pages (including user pages, help pages, etc.), 80 active users, and 7,740,777 total edits. The article depth of Waray Wikipedia is 4.32—a rough indicator of the article's collaborative quality—compared to 143.01 for the Tagalog Wikipedia. (Waray and Tagalog are related languages belonging to the Malayo-Polynesian branch of the Austronesian language family.)

However, Waray Wikipedia does not appear to be widely used in the Philippines; as of March 2021, 90% of Wikipedia views from that country were directed at English Wikipedia, with 5% going to Tagalog and 3% to Russian Wikipedia. About 35% of Waray Wikipedia views come from China, 25% from the United States, about 15% from Germany and France, and less than 8% from the Philippines.

=== Milestones ===
- On August 26, 2010, the Waray Wikipedia passed the 100,000-article milestone, making it the 35th largest language edition at that time.
- On June 8, 2014, the encyclopedia passed the 1 million article mark, which was mostly made by Lsjbot. It was the very first Wikipedia in a language of the Philippines and Asia and regional language that reached 1 million articles.
