= Granby Runestone =

Viking Age runic inscription

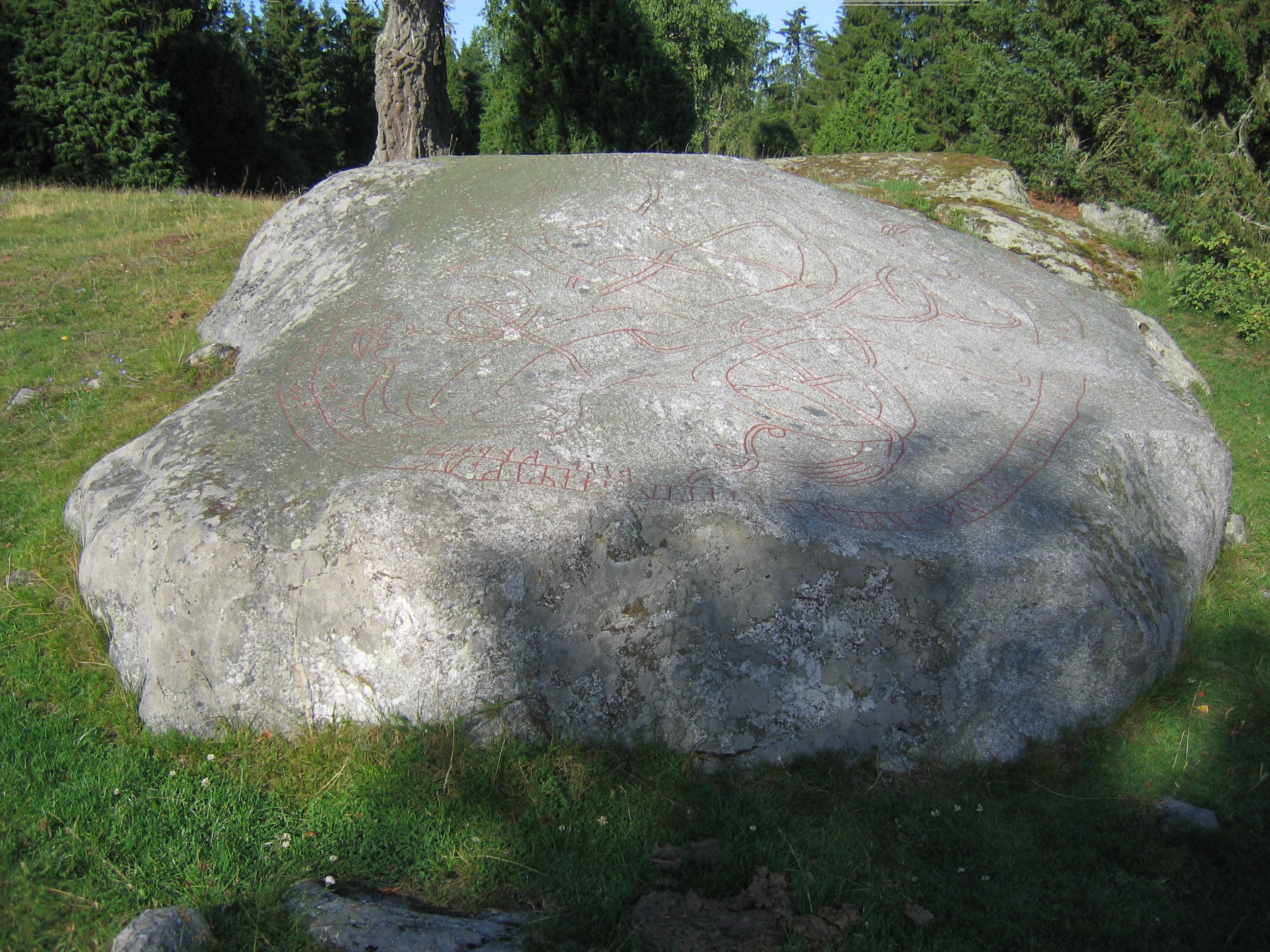
- Created: 11th century
- Discovered: Granby, Uppland, Sweden
- Rundata ID: U 337
- Runemaster: Visäte

The Granby Runestone (Swedish: Granbyhällen), designated as U 337 under the Rundata catalog, is one of the longest Viking Age runic inscriptions located in Uppland, Sweden.

== Description ==
The Granby Runestone has a runic inscription carved on a boulder consisting of a memorial to a father, a mother and some other people. The father Finnvid's property is mentioned. Some of these family members are mentioned on the inscriptions on other local runestones. Kalfr is mentioned on inscriptions U 338 and U 341, which are located in Söderby, and on U 342, which is also located in Granby, and Ragnfríðr is mentioned on U 338.

The runic text states that the inscription was carved by the runemaster Visäte, who was active in Uppland during the last half of the eleventh century. There are seven other runestones signed by Visäte in Uppland, including U 74 in Husby, U 208 in Råcksta, U 236 in Lindö, U 454 in Kumla, U 669 in Kålsta, U 862 in Säva, and U Fv1946;258 in Fällbro. In the runic text Visäte spelled Guð ("God") using an o-rune instead of a u-rune, an alternative spelling which he also used on U 74 and in spelling the name Guðlaug on U Fv1972;172 in Lilla Vilunda.

The inscription is classified as being carved in runestone style Pr4, which is also known as the Urnes style. Inscriptions in this runestone style are characterized by slim and stylized animals that are interwoven into tight patterns. The animal heads are typically seen in profile with slender almond-shaped eyes and upwardly curled appendages on the noses and the necks.

== Inscription ==
+ hemik + uk + sialfi + uk + iohan + þeiʀ + lata hakua + eftʀ + faþur sin + finuiþ + uk + uarkas × uk × rahnfriþ + uk moþur sina + uk + at + ikikerþi + uk + at + kalf + uk + kiarþar + u- ...-at + (h)an ati ' ein × alt fyrst × þat × uaru × freantr þeia + koþ : hialbi + ant þaira + uiseti + risti × runa þisa
{} Hæmingʀ {} ok {} Sialfi {} ok {} Iohan {} þæiʀ {} lata haggva {} æftiʀ {} faður sinn {} Finnvið, {} ok {} Vargas(?)/Varghôss(?) {} ok {} Ragnfriðr, {} ok moður sina, {} ok {} at {} Ingigærði {} ok {} at {} Kalf {} ok {} Gærðar {} o[k] <...-at>. {} Hann atti {} æinn {} allt fyrst. {} Þat {} vaʀu {} frændr þæiʀa. {} Guð {} hialpi {} and þæiʀa. {} Viseti {} risti {} runaʀ þessaʀ.
Hemingr and Sjalfi and Jóhan, they have cut (the stone) in memory of their father Finnviðr and Vargas(?)/Varghôss(?) and Ragnfríðr and their mother, and in memory of Ingigerðr and in memory of Kalfr and Gerðarr and ... He alone owned all at first. These were their kinsmen. May God help their spirits. Véseti carved these runes.

== Gallery ==
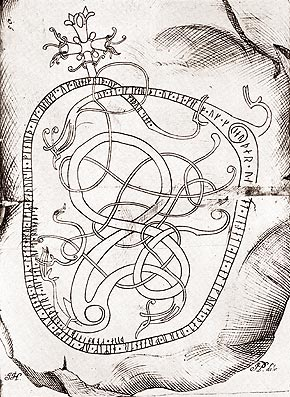
Drawing with a bird's eye view.

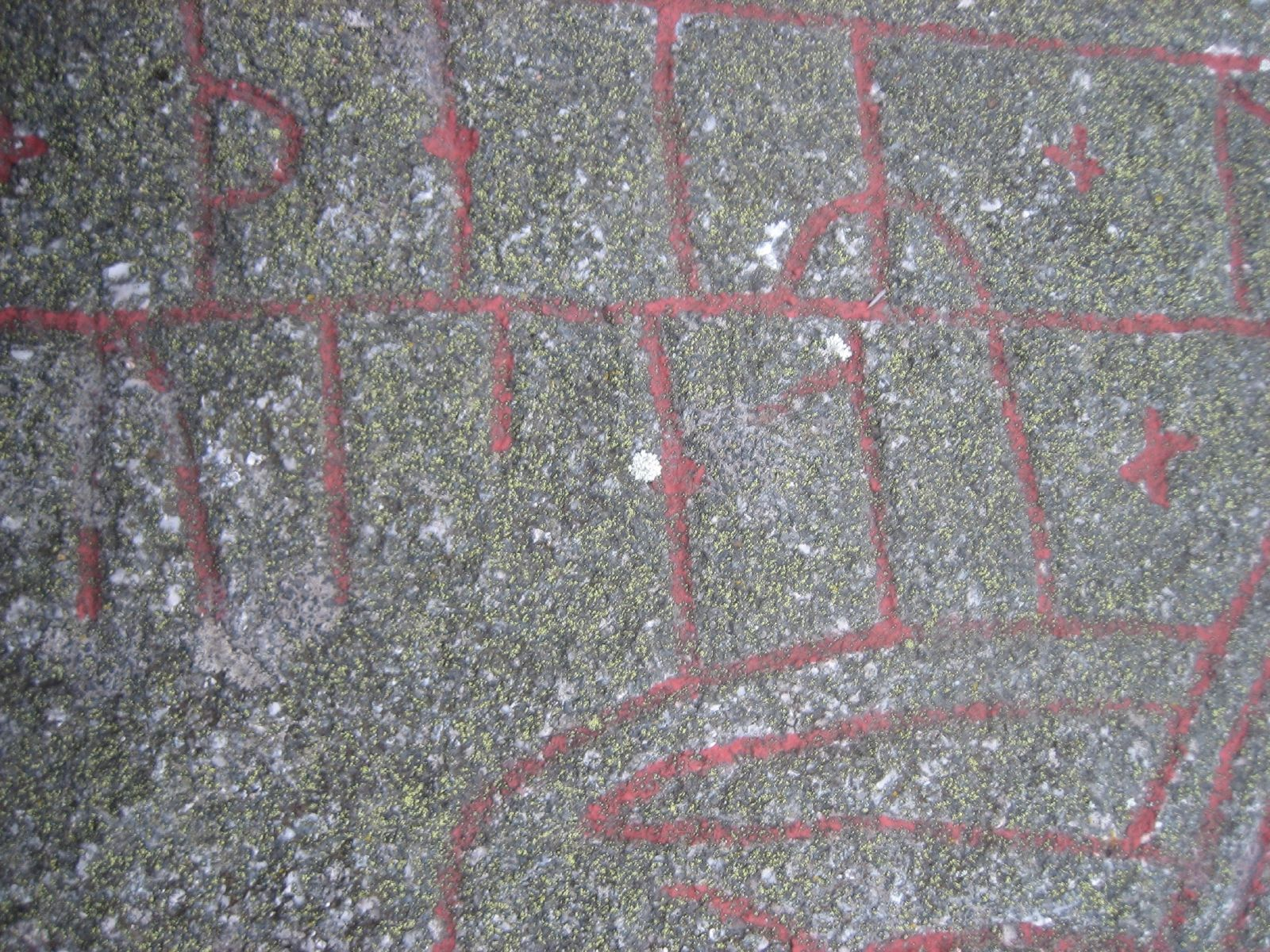
The runemaster Visäte's name.

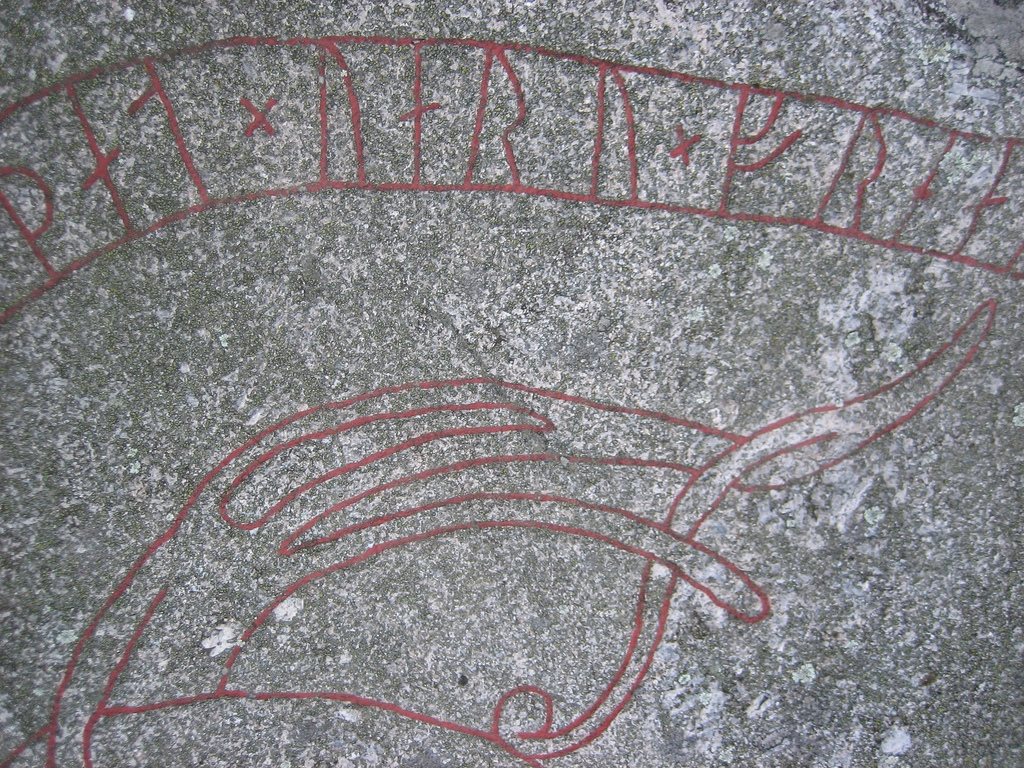
Detail of serpent head.

== See also ==
- List of runestones

== Other sources ==
- The article Runristare - Swedish Museum of National Antiquities.
