= Uppland Runic Inscription Fv1946;258 =

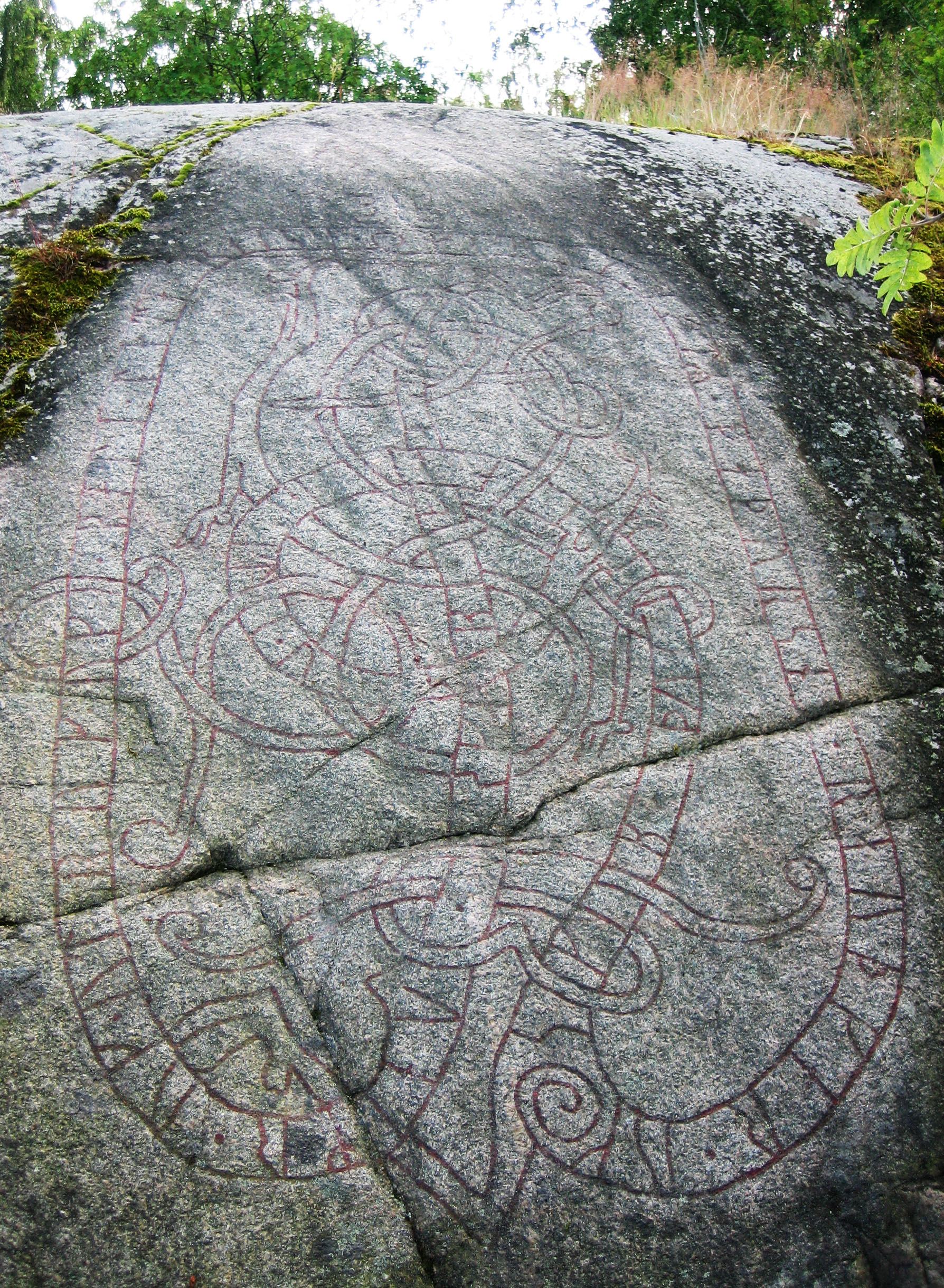
Runic inscription U Fv1946;258 is located in Fällbro, Uppland, Sweden.

Uppland Runic Inscription Fv1946;258 or U Fv1946;258 is the Rundata catalog designation for a Viking Age memorial runic inscription to two fathers that is located in Fällbro, which is about 5 kilometers northwest of Täby, Stockholm County, Sweden, which is in the historic province of Uppland.

== Description ==
This inscription was discovered in 1946 and is carved on a rock-face of a cliff. The runic inscription, which is 2.23 meters high and 1.14 meters wide, consists of text in the younger futhark carved on a serpent that is intertwined in an intricate design. Above the serpent is the figure of a man with raised arms. The inscription is classified as being carved in runestone style Pr4, which is also known as Urnes style. This runestone style is characterized by slim and stylized animals that are interwoven into tight patterns. The animal heads are typically seen in profile with slender almond-shaped eyes and upwardly curled appendages on the noses and the necks.

The runic text states that the inscription is a memorial by three sons in memory of their father. There are two transliterations of the runic text documented in Rundata, the first, which is designated below as P, was performed by Sven B. F. Jansson and published in 1946, and the second, which is designated below as Q, was published in 1997. There are several differences between the two versions based not only on the reading of the runes, but also upon assumptions made regarding missing letters or assumed misspellings from the transliteration to the transcription into Old Norse. Such assumptions are required since letters were often deliberately left out of the runic text under several accepted rules when carving inscriptions on runestones. For the text on U Fv1946;258, in the 1946 version Jansson transcribed the runes rauþkar, the name of the father, as an odd spelling of the Germanic name Hroðgæiʀ, which means "Honor Spear." This interpretation, which ignores the a-rune in the name, was later re-interpreted by Evert Salberger as being Rauðkar, a name given to a man with "red hair."

The text is signed by the runemaster Visäte, who was active during the last half of the eleventh century in southern Uppland. The runes (u)isiti * (r)i(s)ti, meaning Viseti risti ("Véseti carved"), are located near the head of the serpent. Seven other runestones signed by Visäte include U 74 in Husby, U 208 in Råcksta, U 236 in Lindö, U 337 in Granby, U 454 in Kumla, U 669 Kålsta, and U 862 in Säva. Over twenty additional runestones have been attributed to him on stylistic grounds.

The Rundata designation for this inscription, U Fv1946;258, is from the year and page number of the issue of Fornvännen in which the inscription was first described.

== Inscription ==
=== Transliteration of the runes into Latin characters ===
P: * uikr * uk * utryk * uk * bali * lata * raisa * mirki * iftʀ * faþur sn * rauþkar * uk skib * þu-- * -i-a-----i-iti * uk ---... skib * fa-t
Q: * uni(m)r * uk * utryk * uk * bali * lata * raisa * mirki * iftʀ * faþur sn * rauþkar * uk skib ' þu-ilia-- (u)isiti * (r)i(s)ti skibi * fa(s)ti

=== Transcription into Old Norse ===
P: Vigʀ ok Otryggʀ ok Balli lata ræisa mærki æftiʀ faður sinn Hroðgæiʀ ok skip(?) ... ... ok ... skip(?) <fa-t>
Q: Onæmʀ ok Otryggʀ ok Balli lata ræisa mærki æftiʀ faður sinn Rauðkar ok skip(?) ... Viseti risti, skip(?) <fasti>.

=== Translation in English ===
P: Vígr and Ótryggr and Balli have raised the landmark in memory of their father Hróðgeirr and the ship(?) ... ... and ... ship(?) ...
Q: Ónæmr and Ótryggr and Balli have raised the landmark in memory of their father Rauðkárr and the ship(?) ... Véseti carved, ship(?) ...

== See also ==
- List of runestones
