= List of Wikimedia chapters =

Wikimedia movement logo

Wikimedia chapters (blue) Wikimedia user groups with a geographic focus (green)

Wikimedia chapters are national or sub-national not-for-profit organizations created to promote the interests of Wikimedia projects locally, by members of the movement. Chapters are legally independent of the Wikimedia Foundation, entering into an agreement with the foundation following acceptance by the Affiliations Committee (formerly known as "Chapters Committee"), and have no control over Foundation websites. They organize regional conferences, outreach, and global events such as Wikimania.

Wikimedia Deutschland (WMDE) is the oldest chapter, holding its first meeting in 2004. As of 2016, it had a budget of €20 million. Some chapters such as WMDE get some of their funds directly from grants and supporting memberships. Some others get their funds primarily from annual plan grants from WMF. As of 2019, roughly 10% of the WMF budget is distributed in this way to chapters and thematic organizations. As of August 2019 there were 40 recognized Wikimedia chapters in 38 countries.

== List of chapters ==
=== National ===
Area	Article (Note: The links go to the articles on Meta Wikimedia (the central wiki for coordinating across projects); extra links will also appear, if they exist, to articles on the English-language and respective language Wikipedias, in that order. Therefore, most of these links will not lead to encyclopedic pages aimed at the typical reader, and might even assume the reader is already a contributor.)	URL	Since
Argentina	Wikimedia Argentina	wikimedia.org.ar	September 1, 2007
Armenia	Վիքիմեդիա Հայաստան	wikimedia.am	March 26, 2013
Australia	Wikimedia Australia	wikimedia.org.au	March 1, 2008
Austria	Wikimedia Österreich	wikimedia.at	February 26, 2008
Bangladesh	Wikimedia Bangladesh	wikimedia.org.bd	October 3, 2011
Belgium	Wikimedia Belgium	wikimedia.be	October 8, 2014
Brazil	Wikimedia Brasil	br.wikimedia.org	December 11, 2024
Canada	Wikimedia Canada / Wikimédia Canada	wikimedia.ca	May 24, 2011
Chile	Wikimedia Chile	www.wikimedia.cl	July 16, 2011
Colombia	Wikimedia Colombia	co.wikimedia.org	June 14, 2019
Czech Republic	Wikimedia Česká republika	wikimedia.cz	March 6, 2008
Denmark	Wikimedia Danmark	wikimedia.dk	July 3, 2009
Estonia	Wikimedia Eesti	et.wikimedia.org	August 31, 2010
Finland	Wikimedia Suomi	fi.wikimedia.org	September 21, 2009
France	Wikimédia France	wikimedia.fr	October 23, 2004
Georgia	Wikimedia Georgia	ge.wikimedia.org	September 5, 2025
Germany	Wikimedia Deutschland	wikimedia.de	June 13, 2004
Hungary	Wikimédia Magyarország	wikimedia.hu	September 27, 2008
Indonesia	Wikimedia Indonesia	wikimedia.or.id	October 7, 2008
Israel	Wikimedia Israel	wikimedia.org.il	June 26, 2007
Italy	Wikimedia Italia	wikimedia.it	June 17, 2005
Mexico	Wikimedia México	mx.wikimedia.org	August 3, 2011
New Zealand	Wikimedia Aotearoa New Zealand	wikimedia.nz	June 12, 2025
Netherlands	Wikimedia Nederland	nl.wikimedia.org	March 27, 2006
Norway	Wikimedia Norge	wikimedia.no	June 23, 2007
Poland	Wikimedia Polska	pl.wikimedia.org	November 18, 2005
Portugal	Wikimedia Portugal	wikimedia.pt pt.wikimedia.org	July 3, 2009
Serbia	Wikimedia Serbia	rs.wikimedia.org	December 3, 2005 (Note: Originally "Wikimedia Serbia and Montenegro" until June 2006.)
South Africa	Wikimedia South Africa	wmza.org	February 27, 2012
South Korea	위키미디어 한국	kr.wikimedia.org	April 24, 2019
Spain	Wikimedia España	wikimedia.es	February 7, 2011
Sweden	Wikimedia Sverige	wikimedia.se	December 11, 2007
Switzerland	Wikimedia CH	wikimedia.ch	May 14, 2006
Taiwan	台灣維基媒體協會 / Wikimedia Taiwan	wikimedia.tw	July 4, 2007
Thailand	Wikimedia Thailand	th.wikimedia.org	June 14, 2019
Ukraine	Вікімедіа Україна	ua.wikimedia.org	July 3, 2009
United Kingdom	Wikimedia UK	wikimedia.org.uk	January 12, 2009
Uruguay	Wikimedia Uruguay	wikimedia.uy	July 12, 2013
Venezuela	Wikimedia Venezuela	wikimedia.org.ve	October 4, 2011

=== Subnational ===
Area	Article	URL	Since
New York City	Wikimedia New York City	nyc.wikimedia.org m:Wikimedia New York City	January 12, 2009
Washington, D.C.	Wikimedia District of Columbia	wikimediadc.org	September 12, 2011

=== Former ===
Area	Title	URL	Period
Hong Kong	香港維基媒體協會 / Wikimedia Hong Kong	wikimedia.hk	2008–2017
Macau	澳門維基媒體協會 / Wikimedia Macau	wikimedia.org.mo	April 24, 2011 – 2017
Macedonia	Викимедија Македонија	mk.wikimedia.org	September 21, 2009 – 2017
Philippines	Wikimedia Philippines	wikimedia.org.ph	2010 – 2017
India	Wikimedia India	wikimedia.in	2011 – 2019
Russia	Викимедиа РУ	ru.wikimedia.org	May 24, 2008 – 2023
