= Wikipedia coverage of American politics =

Coverage of American politics in Wikipedia is a subject that has received substantial attention from the media. Since its founding in 2001, Wikipedia has provided coverage of six United States presidential elections, six mid-term elections at the federal level, and numerous "off-year" state elections and special elections.

Wikipedia has received both praise and criticism for elements of its political coverage, with some sources asserting that Wikipedia exhibits political neutrality and others asserting the presence of ideological bias on Wikipedia. A nonideological criticism leveled at Wikipedia is that the project's internal standards for notability tend to favor incumbents of either party over challengers, and tend to favor people in male-dominated professions over women. This, as of 2020, had resulted in incumbent candidates in prominent elections receiving large amounts of traffic, while challengers who are not already notable through some other achievement, such as being a professional athlete, have no article or are redirected to a generic article on the election. Substantial debates have occurred within the project over the appropriate point at which to create an article for a challenger, particularly where a challenger is the nominee of one of the two major parties that dominate American politics, where the office contested is particularly visible, and where sources consider the challenger to have a chance to win the election.

The capacity for Wikipedia to be edited by anyone has, conversely, led to circumstances where political figures, or those who work for them, have directly tried to change the content of articles about them or their opponents. This has resulted in scrutiny of United States congressional staff edits to Wikipedia.

== Editorial activity ==
=== 2016 United States presidential election ===
In the early stages of the 2016 United States presidential election, The New York Observer reported that Wikipedia's article on Donald Trump was the busiest of the 2016 U.S. presidential candidates. The New York Times noted that the article usually attracted more views than his Republican rivals. In September 2016, Business Insider reported that the article subject was one of the 29 most controversial people on Wikipedia, and the following month The New York Observer reported that the article entry was bulkier than either the articles on George W. Bush and Barack Obama, while The Washington Post reported that the article had more than three times the number of edits than Hillary Clinton since January 2015. The article was the second most edited English Wikipedia article of 2016. It was commented on by Billboard, PCMag, The Verge, and others.

Following Trump's election, his article was the second most viewed English Wikipedia article of 2017, at 29.6 million views, and was covered in reporting by Mashable, Newshub, VentureBeat, and others. In 2018, the article was covered for image vandalism.

=== January 6 United States Capitol attack ===
At around 1:30 PM EST on January 6, 2021, Wikipedia user Jason Moore started the page on the January 6 United States Capitol attack. At the time, the page was called "January 2021 Donald Trump rally". After the rally turned into an attack, the Wikipedia community quickly expanded the article, and it reached a size of 3000 words by midnight UK time. The word count increased to over 10000 words by January 15. As the event unfolded, a statement was put out in a Facebook group popular among editors, telling community members living in Washington D.C. not to risk their lives taking pictures of the event for Wikimedia Commons. User Molly White, who had been editing the article since it was created, said that she considered editing the article to be better than doomscrolling. The article was quickly placed under page protection, requiring accounts to have a certain age and number of edits to edit the page.

In the hours following the attack, Wikipedia's editors began to debate what the title of the attack's article should be. There was agreement among commenters that the title in use at that time, 2021 United States Capitol protests, was not sufficient. However, there was a lot of disagreement on what name should be used instead. Some of the options advocated for were calling it an insurrection, a riot, or a coup. Proponents for specific titles cited internal Wikipedia pages and terminology used by news sources to support their position. On January 7, Wikipedia administrator CaptainEek renamed the article to "2021 storming of the United States Capitol", although attempts to change the name continued.

=== Other ===
Before a meeting between Trump and Australian prime minister Anthony Albanese in 2025, Australian Financial Review opined that it would be a positive sign if the meeting did not get its own Wikipedia article, referring to Trump's meetings with Ukrainian president Volodymyr Zelenskyy and South African president Cyril Ramaphosa earlier that year.

== Editing by political operatives ==
Some Wikipedia edits by staff of the United States Congress have created controversy, notably in early to mid-2006. Several such instances, such as those involving Marty Meehan, Norm Coleman, Conrad Burns, Joe Biden, Tom Harkin, and Tom Coburn received significant media attention. Others, such as those involving Gil Gutknecht, David Davis, and Mike Pence, were reported but received less widespread coverage.

Biographical information on various politicians was edited by their own staff to remove undesirable information (including pejorative statements quoted, or broken campaign promises), add favorable information or "glowing" tributes, add negative information to opponents' biographies, or replace the article in part or whole by staff-authored biographies.

On January 27, 2006, The Lowell Sun, published an article entitled "Rewriting history under the dome", which revealed the editing by Congressional staff members of Representative Marty Meehan's Wikipedia entry. Further investigation by Wikipedia editors discovered over a thousand edits by IP addresses allocated to either the House of Representatives or the Senate. Wikipedia editors found that most of the edits were considered to be in good faith, but a minority of edits were considered improper. At least one of the addresses involved was prohibited from further editing.

In 2011, former vice presidential candidate Sarah Palin commented on the history of Paul Revere. This led to Palin supporters attempting to change the Wikipedia article about him to match Palin's comments.

Ed Summers, a web developer, created a Twitter feed in 2014 to notify any changes made from IP addresses associated with the U.S. Congress: @congressedits was an automated Twitter account initiated in 2014 that tweeted anonymous changes to Wikipedia articles that originated from IP addresses belonging to the United States Congress. The changes were presumed to have been made by the staffs of US elected representatives and senators. In September 2018, an anonymous editor from Congress posted the personal information of several Republican senators into their articles, leading to CongressEdits being banned from Twitter.

In August 2014, the Cato Institute suggested that congressional staffers should spend spare time editing Wikipedia. A panel hosted by the institute endorsed the idea so that congressional staffers could use their time to write neutral and informative articles about proposed legislation to better educate the public. Experts on the panel considered the two main obstacles to doing this as being skepticism towards Wikipedia and the history of biased editing from Congressional staffers. The Cato Institute suggested one way to overcome these issues would be for the staffers to create user accounts and user profile pages disclosing their connections with Congress.

On September 27, 2018, the disambiguation page for "Devil's Triangle" was edited from a House of Representatives IP address to describe it as a drinking game, matching the testimony of Supreme Court nominee Brett Kavanaugh regarding his use of the term in his high school yearbook.

== Assessments of bias and impartiality ==
In a September 2010 issue of the conservative weekly Human Events, Rowan Scarborough presented a critique of Wikipedia's coverage of American politicians prominent in the approaching U.S. midterm elections as evidence of systemic liberal bias. Scarborough compares the biographical articles of liberal and conservative opponents in Senate races in the Alaska Republican primary and the Delaware and Nevada general election, emphasizing the quantity of negative coverage of Tea Party movement-endorsed candidates. He also cites criticism by writer Lawrence Solomon and quotes in full the lead section of Wikipedia's article on Conservapedia as evidence of an underlying bias.

In Is Wikipedia Biased? (2012), the authors examined a sample of 28,382 articles related to U.S. politics as of January 2011, measuring their degree of bias on a "slant index" based on a method developed by economists Matthew Gentzkow and Jesse Shapiro in 2010, to measure bias in newspaper media. This slant index purports to measure an ideological lean toward either Democratic or Republican based on key phrases within the text such as "war in Iraq", "civil rights", "trade deficit", "economic growth", "illegal immigration" and "border security". Each phrase is assigned a slant index based on how often it is used by Democratic versus Republican members of U.S. Congress and this lean rating is assigned to a Wikipedia contribution that includes the same key phrase. The authors concluded that older articles from the early years of Wikipedia leaned Democratic, whereas those created more recently held more balance. They suggest that articles did not change their bias significantly due to revision, but rather that over time newer articles containing opposite points of view were responsible for centering the average overall.

In a more extensive American follow-up study, Do Experts or Collective Intelligence Write with More Bias? Evidence from Encyclopedia Britannica and Wikipedia (2018), Greenstein and Zhu directly compare about 4,000 articles related to U.S. politics between Wikipedia (written by an online community) and the matching articles from Encyclopædia Britannica (written by experts) using similar methods as their 2010 study to measure "slant" (Democratic vs. Republican) and to quantify the degree of "bias". The authors found that "Wikipedia articles are more slanted towards Democratic views than are Britannica articles, as well as more biased", particularly those focusing on civil rights, corporations, and government. Entries about immigration trended toward Republican. They further found that "(t)he difference in bias between a pair of articles decreases with more revisions" and, when articles were substantially revised, the difference in bias compared to Britannica was statistically negligible. The implication, per the authors, is that "many contributions are needed to reduce considerable bias and slant to something close to neutral".

During the 2020 United States presidential election, Vox wrote: "In yet another election cycle defined by copious amounts of misinformation from a variety of sources, Wikipedia wants – and is set up – to be a carefully curated resource of impartial facts". During the same period, Wired noted: "Owing in part to its reputation for evenhandedness, and the way it conveniently bundles sources for readers, Wikipedia has played a growing role in American politics, too. It is not unusual for Senate candidates—including many of the high-profile candidates running right now—to see several thousand visits to their page on any given day". Wired further states that in the area of politics, "Wikipedia developed a special standard, which in theory is applied equally to all: No challenger running for office automatically enjoys notability, no matter the race—even for US Senate. All candidates are inherently 'non-notable' unless they have held previous elected office or have achieved notability in their private life". Wired found that this practice provided an advantage to incumbents and a disadvantage to challengers, further stating that "Wikipedia's notability litmus test doesn't just advantage political incumbents; it advantages the kind of people—insiders, celebrities, men—who already enjoy notable status in a social and economic hierarchy that others in politics may wish to democratize".

== See also ==
- List of political editing incidents on Wikipedia
