= Politics of Wikipedia =

Politics of Wikipedia may refer to:

- Ideological bias on Wikipedia, whether real or perceived
- Wikipedia coverage of American politics
- The political views of Jimmy Wales, the founder of Wikipedia
- List of political editing incidents on Wikipedia
  - United States congressional staff edits to Wikipedia, a controversy caused by politically motivated conflict-of-interest edits
- Deletionism and inclusionism on Wikipedia, opposing philosophies within the Wikipedia community about the inclusion of articles

== See also ==
- Censorship of Wikipedia
- Criticism of Wikipedia
