= LGBTQ people and Wikipedia =

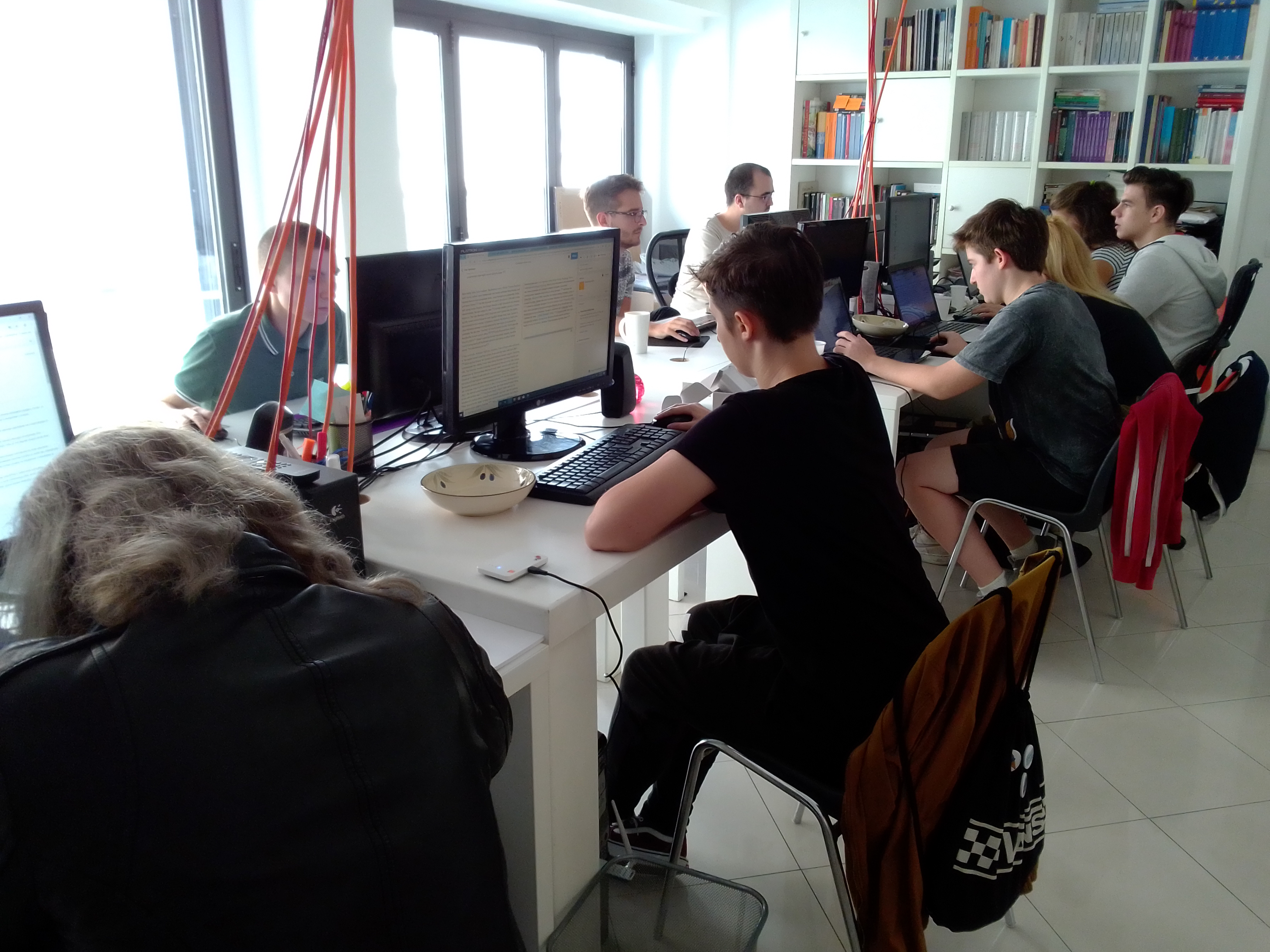
Participants at a Wiki Loves Pride event to improve LGBTQ-related content on Wikipedia, in Serbia (2019)

There are various intersections of the LGBTQ community (Note: There are multiple acronyms for the LGBTQ community (see LGBTQ § Variants for more details). This article uses "LGBTQ", though quotes may use other acronyms.) and Wikipedia. LGBTQ people who edit the online encyclopedia often face cyberbullying and other types of harassment. Wikipedia content about LGBTQ individuals is often vandalized, but various Wikipedia user groups, WikiProjects, and the Wikimedia Foundation endorse campaigns to promote inclusion on Wikipedia. Availability of Wikipedia's LGBTQ content, in countries that otherwise suppress information about LGBTQ issues, has been praised.

== LGBTQ coverage ==
In 2011, the Wikimedia Foundation (WMF) made it a strategic goal to recruit more women, people of color, and other underrepresented individuals as editors, including LGBTQ people.

In 2019, Rachel Wexelbaum, an associate professor at St. Cloud State University in Minnesota, United States, wrote, "For LGBTIQ+ people and those searching for LGBTIQ+ information, Wikipedia has proven invaluable in countries where LGBTIQ+ publications, media, or visibility may be criminalized or cut short due to AIDS NGOs leaving those countries." It can also be valuable for those in communities where this information is socially marginalized; a notable example is the experience of transgender author and activist Abby Stein, who discovered the idea of being transgender on the Hebrew Wikipedia. Wikipedia is often consulted by LGBTQ youth seeking information on sexual health, as Wikipedia's coverage of health-related topics is backed by numerous medical journals. Some Wikipedia editors, however, have reported struggles with encouraging LGBTQ health organizations to participate in contributing LGBTQ-specific health information to Wikipedia.

In some cases, particular language editions of Wikipedia have slanted toward anti-LGBTQ content. The Croatian Wikipedia has been criticized for advancing homophobic propaganda and for other reasons. In addition, the only active administrator of Amharic Wikipedia, at one point, enforced the Ethiopian government's anti-LGBTQ laws on the wiki. According to Business Insider, an anonymous editor using an IP address coming from the United States House of Representatives, who claimed to be a Capitol Hill staffer, made a series of edits about the transgender community, including some that were critical of transgender individuals.

=== Names and pronouns ===
The English Wikipedia's style guidelines on identity state editors should describe transgender and non-binary subjects using their preferred name and pronouns corresponding to their most recently stated gender identity. However, such articles are frequently targeted with vandalism, misgendering or deadnaming their subjects. In August 2008, the article about Ina Fried, a transgender journalist for CNET, was caught in an edit war over which pronouns to use for her. She stated that Wikipedia did not have a stylebook on gender, unlike the Associated Press Stylebook, and said that while she found it "somewhat confusing" to see the gender changes on her page, she "found the debate interesting". She later added that it was a "reasonable compromise" to remove all pronouns in her biography entry.

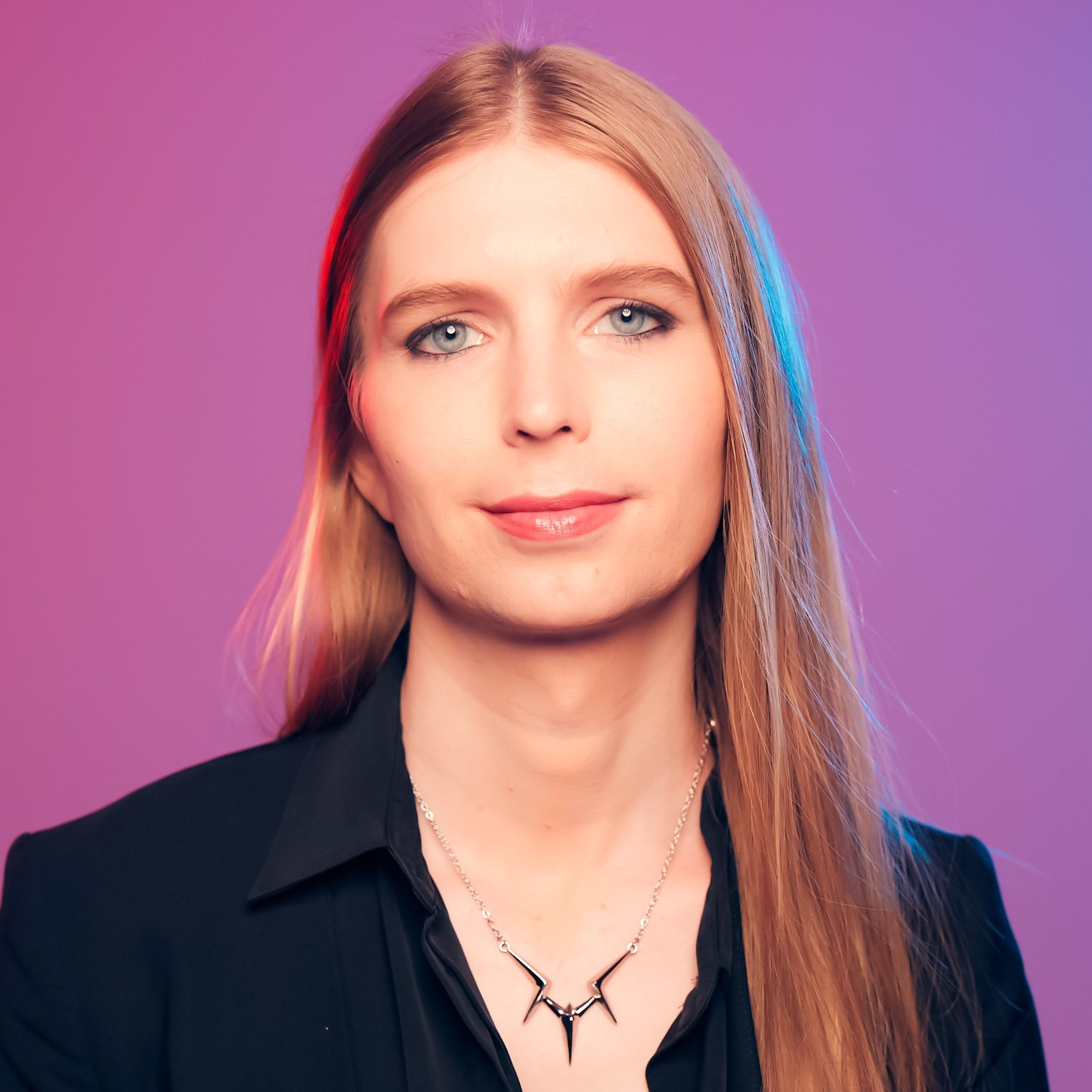
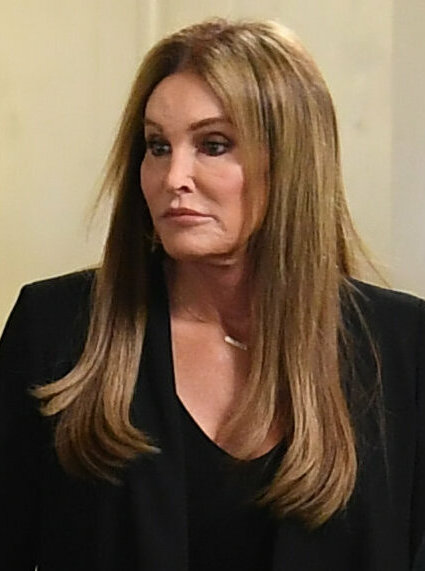
Editors debated the titles and pronouns used in Wikipedia's entries for Chelsea Manning (left) and Caitlyn Jenner (right) after both transitioned.

After Chelsea Manning came out in August 2013, editors debated the title of the article about her. At the time, Slate praised actions by Wikipedia editors, saying that Manning's article was rewritten quickly and with "remarkably little controversy". However, in October 2013, The Guardian noted that the English Wikipedia's Arbitration Committee had "banned a number of editors from working on articles related to transgender topics or individuals", noting that while some were banned for "making transphobic comments about Manning", others received the same punishment "for pointing out the bigotry". Two of the restricted editors had insisted on referring to Manning as a man, while another editor who alleged the existence of "a 'consensus' of virulently transphobic" Wikipedia editors was sanctioned for a "battleground approach" by the committee.

Following Caitlyn Jenner's gender transition in 2015, Kat George of Bustle wrote, "We can start learning about the proper use of gender pronouns, with Caitlyn Jenner's Wikipedia article as a perfect example of the correct before and after language we should be employing." The name and pronouns to use for Gloria Hemingway were a matter of discussion for over 15 years. In February 2022, after a week of debate, votes were evenly split between using Gloria and "she/her" pronouns, or continuing to use her birth name. An editor closed the discussion in favor of renaming; the decision was appealed but upheld by an administrator.

== Harassment ==
Wikipedia editors experience harassment, and in one case, a transgender editor was publicly deadnamed. The WMF has expressed concern over situations where transgender editors could be repelled from Wikipedia due to online abuse. BBC News said in 2020, "Many, particularly women and members of the LGBTQ community, have complained of abuse and harassment from other editors." Editors can report harassment to administrators via email or notice boards, which can cause harassers to be barred from editing.

Editors in anti-LGBTQ areas experience more virulent harassment. LGBTQ editors from countries where being LGBTQ is criminalized often use aliases and edit from various IP addresses so their work is not traced back to them. In one instance, an editor was blocked by a Wikipedia administrator since their username suggested they may be gay. The administrator was eventually blocked for those actions when WMF's Trust and Safety Team got involved. Amir Sarabadani, an editor, stated that in 12 years of editing Persian Wikipedia, users were often hostile to articles related to homosexuality. He said that his work as an administrator there helped make abuse less tolerable and that homophobic content that was previously acceptable now resulted in blocks.

In October 2022, a group of 40 French public figures, including director Céline Sciamma, writer Virginie Despentes, writer and graphic novel illustrator Jul Maroh, writer and philosopher Paul B. Preciado, and journalist and filmmaker Rokhaya Diallo, in conjunction with the National Transgender Association of France, signed an open letter, published in L'Obs magazine, to Wikipedia, denouncing "stigmatizing behaviors" against transgender, non-binary, and intersex people on Wikipedia including misgendering, deadnaming, the use of pre-transition pictures, and harassment of openly trans editors.

== Wikimedia movement ==
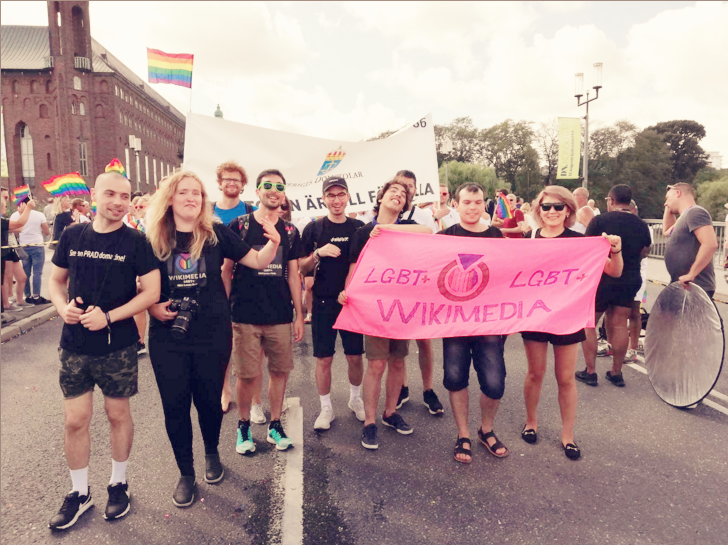
Wikimedia LGBT+ representation at EuroPride in Stockholm, 2018

The Wikimedia movement has seen campaigns and hosted edit-a-thons to improve coverage of LGBTQ topics. Wikipedia Loves Libraries, one of these initiatives, saw the Tom of Finland Foundation become the first LGBTQ cultural heritage institution to participate, hosting "Queering Wikipedia" edit-a-thons. Wiki Loves Pride is a campaign from June to October to create and improve LGBTQ-related content across Wikimedia projects. Wiki Loves Pride has promoted coverage of notable LGBTQ people. Art+Feminism has been described as "a campaign to improve the site's representation of women and nonbinary individuals". WikiProject LGBTQ+ studies, (Note: WikiProjects are spaces where editors can list articles for creation, work to enhance the quality of existing articles, and review the status of articles under their jurisdiction.) which works to create and enhance articles on LGBTQ topics, is present on 28 Wikipedias, as of 2023. An LGBTQ portal for organization has been overseen since 2006.

Wikimedia LGBT is a user group affiliate of WMF, established in August 2012. In 2022, WMF joined human rights and LGBTQ organizations in opposing the Kids Online Safety Act introduced in the United States Senate. The groups argued that "over-moderation" would "cut off members of marginalized younger groups who rely on online services to learn about sex education or access LGBTQ+ resources". In 2023, organizers of Wikimania requested a unisex public toilet for the duration of the conference at the Suntec Singapore Convention and Exhibition Centre. One was temporarily converted from an existing restroom usually designated for women, prompting "some hostile reactions" online, according to Today.

British physicist and Wikipedia editor Jess Wade has worked to improve coverage of LGBTQ topics on the site. Every day in 2018, Wade wrote at least one Wikipedia article about a woman, person of color, or LGBTQ figure in science to expand the diversity of Wikipedia's coverage.
