= Tennessee House of Representatives 7th district =

State legislative district in Tennessee

Tennessee's 7th State House of Representatives district
- Map of Tennessee House districts, with the 7th District shaded in red
Representative
Rebecca Alexander; R–Jonesborough
- Demographics: 84.3% White; 4.3% Black; 6.4% Hispanic; 1.2% Asian; 0.2% Other; 3.6% Multiracial
- Population (2024): 68,174

The Tennessee House of Representatives 7th district is one of 99 legislative districts in the Tennessee House of Representatives. It represents the east and south of Washington County and includes Jonesborough, Embreeville, Telford and parts of Johnson City. It has been represented by Republican Rebecca Alexander since 2021.

== Demographics ==
According to the Tennessee Comptroller, District 4 had a population of approximately 68,174 as of 2024.

- 84.3% of the district is White
- 4.3% of the district is African American
- 6.4% of the district is Hispanic
- 1.2% of the district is Asian
- 0.2% of the district is some other race
- 3.6% of the district is two or more races

== List of representatives ==
Representative	Party	Years of service	General Assembly	Residence
Rebecca Alexander	Republican	2021–present	112th–114th	Jonesborough
Matthew Hill	Republican	2005–2021	104th–111th	Jonesborough
Robert D. "Bob" Patton	Republican	1995–2005	99th–103rd	Johnson City
Tommy G. Haun	Republican	1989–1995	96th–98th	Greeneville

== Electoral history ==
=== 2024 ===
2024 Tennessee House of Representatives election, District 7
Party	Candidate	Votes	%
Republican	Rebecca Alexander	19,016	71.27
Democratic	Sylvain Bruni	7,665	28.73
Total votes		26,681	100.00

=== 2022 ===
2022 Tennessee House of Representatives election, District 7
Party	Candidate	Votes	%
Republican	Rebecca Alexander	12,411	100.00
Total votes		12,411	100.00

=== 2020 ===
2020 Tennessee House of Representatives election, District 7
Party	Candidate	Votes	%
Republican	Rebecca Alexander	18,136	100.00
Total votes		18,136	100.00

=== 2018 ===
2018 Tennessee House of Representatives election, District 7
Party	Candidate	Votes	%
Republican	Matthew Hill	13,240	66.43
Democratic	Nathan Farnor	6,690	33.57
Total votes		19,930	100.00

=== 2016 ===
2016 Tennessee House of Representatives election, District 7
Party	Candidate	Votes	%
Republican	Matthew Hill	14,385	67.78
Democratic	Nancy Fischman	6,840	32.22
Total votes		21,225	100.00

=== 2014 ===
2014 Tennessee House of Representatives election, District 7
Party	Candidate	Votes	%
Republican	Matthew Hill	9,487	100.00
Total votes		9,487	100.00

=== 2012 ===
2012 Tennessee House of Representatives election, District 7
Party	Candidate	Votes	%
Republican	Matthew Hill	12,960	65.68
Democratic	Nancy Fischman	6,773	34.32
Total votes		19,733	100.00

=== 2010 ===
2010 Tennessee House of Representatives election, District 7
Party	Candidate	Votes	%
Republican	Matthew Hill	8,320	64.71
Democratic	Todd Mrozek	4,122	32.06
Independent	Jesse Overbey	416	3.24
Total votes		12,858	100.00

=== 2008 ===
2008 Tennessee House of Representatives election, District 7
Party	Candidate	Votes	%
Republican	Matthew Hill	13,443	69.10
Independent	Mike Williams	6,012	30.90
Total votes		19,455	100.00

=== 2006 ===
2006 Tennessee House of Representatives election, District 7
Party	Candidate	Votes	%
Republican	Matthew Hill	8,181	52.32
Democratic	Fred Phillips	7,456	47.68
Total votes		15,637	100.00

=== 2004 ===
2004 Tennessee House of Representatives election, District 7
Party	Candidate	Votes	%
Republican	Matthew Hill	11,371	59.23
Democratic	Tony DeLucia	7,828	40.77
Total votes		19,199	100.00

=== 2002 ===
2002 Tennessee House of Representatives election, District 7
Party	Candidate	Votes	%
Republican	Robert D. "Bob" Patton	7,950	62.64
Democratic	Mark Thomas	4,741	37.36
Total votes		12,691	100.00

=== 2000 ===
2000 Tennessee House of Representatives election, District 7
Party	Candidate	Votes	%
Republican	Robert "Bob" Patton	11,842	99.91
Independent	Write-ins	11	0.09
Total votes		11,853	100.00
