= Another Believer =

Another Believer may refer to:

- "Another Believer", a song by Rufus Wainwright from the soundtrack to the film Meet the Robinsons
- Jason Moore (Wikipedia editor) (born 1984/1985), American Wikipedia editor with the username "Another Believer"
