= Commercial use of Wikimedia projects =

Any business or product selling content from Wikipedia or Wikimedia projects

Commercial use of Wikimedia projects refers to any business or product selling content from Wikipedia or Wikimedia projects which it freely took. Wikimedia projects use free and open copyright licenses which means that anyone may share the information for any purpose.

Commercial organizations which take without giving back may face criticism or social pressure.

== Conflict-of-interest editing on Wikipedia ==
Conflict-of-interest editing on Wikipedia occurs when editors use Wikipedia to advance the interests of their external roles or relationships. The type of COI editing of most concern on Wikipedia is paid editing for public relations (PR) purposes.

Controversies reported by the media include United States congressional staff editing articles about members of Congress in 2006; Microsoft offering a software engineer money to edit articles on competing code standards in 2007; the PR firm Bell Pottinger editing articles about its clients in 2011; and the discovery in 2012 that British MPs or their staff had removed criticism from articles about those MPs. The media has also written about COI editing by BP, the Central Intelligence Agency, Diebold, Portland Communications, Sony, the Vatican, and several others.

== Republication of Wikimedia content ==
In response to criticism about distributing misinformation, in 2018 YouTube announced a plan to match their videos to Wikipedia as a factchecking strategy. YouTube did not inform anyone in the Wikimedia Foundation that they were organizing this project. Critics questioned the fairness of YouTube and parent Google having a business model which shifts responsibility to Wikipedia's volunteer editors and does not apparently give back to that labor force.

Facebook created a feature in 2018 to likewise use Wikipedia to counter fake news. Beginning in April, news articles posted to Facebook have had an information button directing the user to the news publisher's Wikipedia entry, among other background content. Due to this, Breitbart News and other right-wing media organizations criticized Facebook and Wikipedia, especially over perceived bias in the content of Wikipedia's article on Breitbart. Also due to Facebook's and Google's use of Wikipedia to counter fake news, the Wikimedia Foundation is planning to formally ask the companies for compensation for its services.

In May 2018, Google republished information that it took from Wikipedia. When critics complained that the information was incorrect, Google apologized by saying that they took the information from Wikipedia.

== Commercial use of Wikidata ==
Wikidata has many applications as a centralized store of reference information. Commercial use is a category of these applications.

In July 2017 a small business reported benefit from using Wikidata in their commercial product.

== Response ==
Wikimedia Foundation director Katherine Maher has called on commercial organizations to develop Wikipedia and the shared commons to match their use of it.

On March 16, 2021, the Wikimedia Foundation announced the launch of Wikimedia Enterprise, a commercial product designed to sell and deliver Wikipedia's content directly to Big Tech companies. Agreements between the Big Tech companies and Wikimedia LLC, the foundation's new subsidiary, could be reached as early as June. The Wikimedia Foundation also plans on offering Wikimedia Enterprise to smaller companies.
