= CongressEdits =

Social media bot

@congressedits
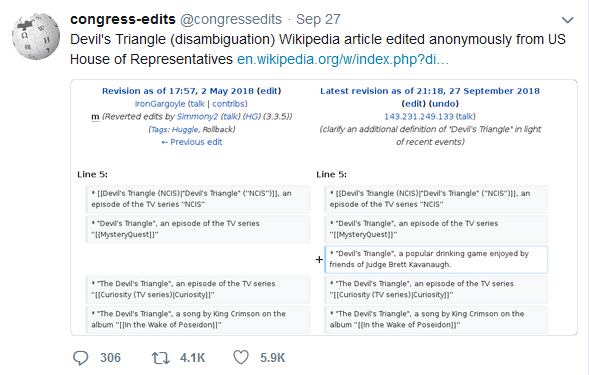
- A Tweet by @congressedits, showing an edit made to the article Devil's Triangle (disambiguation) that insults Supreme Court justice Brett Kavanaugh
- Website type: Twitter bot account, later relaunched on Mastodon
- Available in: English
- Owner: Ed Summers
- Website: botsin.space/@congressedits
- Launched: July 8, 2014
- Current status: Inactive

CongressEdits (@congressedits) (known as anon on GitHub) was a social media bot account created on July 8, 2014, that posted changes to Wikipedia articles that originate from IP addresses within the ranges assigned to the United States Congress. The changes could be made by anyone using a computer on the U.S. Capitol complex's computer network, including both staff of U.S. elected representatives and senators as well as visitors such as journalists, constituents, tourists, and lobbyists. CongressEdits has been called a watchdog by NBC News.

The account began on Twitter until it was suspended in October 2018, making its tweets only accessible through archival services. CongressEdits was migrated to Mastodon after its suspension, until its parent instance botsin.space was shut down in March 2025.

== History ==
CongressEdits was written by and was run by Ed Summers, a web developer, who was inspired by a friend's tweet about Parliament WikiEdits, run by Tom Scott, which performs the same function for the staffers of Parliament of the United Kingdom. It has since been credited for inspiring additional bots for Australia, Canada, South Africa, Switzerland, The Netherlands, Israel, Chile, Italy and Greece. Summers wrote that his "hope for @congressedits wasn't to expose inanity, or belittle our elected officials." He emphasized that he did not see edits to such articles as Step Up 3D, It's Always Sunny in Philadelphia, or Horse head mask as "something to make fun of," and points to "substantial edits like changing a Congressperson's party affiliation from Democrat to Independent." Ultimately, he wanted to see Congressional staffers log in to Wikipedia, identifying themselves to use their knowledge of the issues and history to help make Wikipedia better. Summers wrote that he saw the project "as a potentially useful transparency tool".

Tweets since November 6, 2017, included screenshots of the specific changes made to the article.

CongressEdits was credited with bringing to light edits to Senate Intelligence Committee report on CIA torture by a United States Senate shared address on December 9 and 10, 2014, which removed the phrase "(a euphemism for torture)", with revision notes of "removing bias"; however, these edits were soon reverted.

In 2017, the bot revealed many instances of disruptive edits by apparent Congressional interns, ranging from commentary on pop culture to inserting unsourced and controversial information about living people to direct communication with followers of the account.

On November 4, 2025, Wikipedia enabled temporary accounts, which means that anonymous editors no longer expose their IP addresses to other users, effectively making CongressEdits useless.

== Source code ==
The code for the bot itself is open-source software, and can be configured to watch for anonymous edits from any IP ranges or individual IP addresses.

== Controversy ==
On July 25, 2014, Wikipedia's co-founder Jimmy Wales told the BBC that the @congressedits Twitter feed may have been counterproductive. Referring to a Wikipedia administrator's 10-day editing block, imposed on July 24 against a shared address within the range assigned to the U.S. House of Representatives, for disruptive editing, Wales said, "There is a belief from some of the [Wikipedia] community that it only provoked someone—some prankster there in the office—to have an audience now for the pranks, and actually encouraged them rather than discouraged them."

In September and early October 2018, during the Brett Kavanaugh Supreme Court appointment hearings, Republican senators were doxxed by Congressional IP editors who inserted home addresses and phone numbers into Wikipedia articles. The private information was tweeted to the bot's approximately 65,000 followers before it was removed from the articles. Following additional doxxing by Congressional IP editors, Twitter suspended the account.

== Notes ==
- Levine, Gregg (July 11, 2014). "Those who do not learn history are doomed to retweet it". Al Jazeera. Archived from the original on September 28, 2018.
- Murphy, David (July 12, 2014). "New @congressedits Twitter Account Tracks Anonymous Wikipedia Updates". PCMag.com.
- Collins, Ben (December 21, 2017). "The Congressional Intern Secretly Vandalizing Wikipedia". The Daily Beast.
- Beutler, William (January 17, 2019). "What Happened to CongressEdits? The Thrilling Life and Untold Death of Twitter's Most Important Wikipedia Bot". The Wikipedian. Archived from the original on January 15, 2021.
