= Rebecca Alexander (politician) =

American politician (born 1958)

Member of the Tennessee House of Representatives from the 7th district
- Incumbent
- Assumed office January 12, 2021
- Preceded by: Matthew Hill

Personal details
- Born: Rebecca Kefauver; November 4, 1958 (age 68)
- Party: Republican
- Children: 2
- Education: Milligan College (BA); East Tennessee State University (MEd)

Rebecca Alexander (born November 4, 1958) is an American politician, businesswoman, and former teacher serving as a member of the Tennessee House of Representatives from the 7th district. She assumed office on January 12, 2021.

== Early life and education ==
Rebecca Alexander was born on November 4, 1958. She graduated from Daniel Boone High School in Gray, Tennessee. She then earned a BA in English, sociology, and psychology from Milligan College and a MEd with an emphasis in storytelling from East Tennessee State University.

== Career ==
Alexander began her career as an English teacher. She then joined Magnavox, eventually becoming a national sales manager with the organization. She also helped her husband operate his family's business, the Dillow-Taylor Funeral Home. Alexander was elected to the Tennessee House of Representatives in November 2020.

In 2023, the Tennessee House voted on motions to remove three sitting Democratic representatives — Gloria Johnson, Justin Jones, and Justin J. Pearson — for disrupting proceedings with a protest as demonstrators were at the capitol voicing their outrage over a mass shooting at a Nashville school that left six dead. Alexander voted in favor of all three resolutions: HR 63, to remove Pearson; HR 64, to remove Johnson; and HR 65, to remove Jones. Pearson and Jones were expelled, while Johnson was not.

== Personal life ==
She is married and has two daughters.
