= United States congressional staff edits to Wikipedia =

Some edits to the online encyclopedia Wikipedia by staff of the United States Congress have created controversy, notably in early to mid-2006. Several such instances, such as those involving Marty Meehan, Norm Coleman, Conrad Burns, and Joe Biden, received significant media attention. Others, such as those involving Gil Gutknecht, were reported but received less widespread coverage. Biographical information on various politicians was edited by their own staff to remove undesirable information (including pejorative statements quoted, or broken campaign promises), add favorable information or "glowing" tributes, add negative information to opponents' biographies, or replace the article in part or whole by staff-authored biographies.

== Background ==
On January 27, 2006, The Sun of Lowell, Massachusetts, published an article entitled "Rewriting History Under the Dome", which revealed the editing by Congressional staff members of Representative Marty Meehan's Wikipedia entry. Meehan's chief of staff Matt Vogel stated that he had "authorized an intern in July to replace existing Wikipedia content with a staff-written biography of the lawmaker". Further investigation by Wikipedia editors discovered over a thousand edits by IP addresses allocated to either the US House of Representatives or the US Senate. Wikipedia editors found that most of the edits were considered to be in good faith, but a minority of edits were considered improper. At least one of the addresses involved was prohibited from further editing.

Yesterday's story, "Rewriting history under the dome," accurately reported that in July of 2005 an intern in my office responsible for updating my biography also updated my online Wikipedia entry. I did not know that this change was being made at the time and was only made aware of it yesterday when informed that The Sun had inquired about it. Though the actual time spent on this issue amounted to 11 minutes, according to server logs, I do not consider it time well spent or approve of it in any way. ... It was a waste of energy and an error in judgment on the part of my staff to have allowed any time to be spent on updating my Wikipedia entry. I thank The Sun for bringing it to my attention.

— Congressman Marty Meehan, The Sun

== Incidents ==
=== Norm Coleman ===
Later in January 2006, Senator Norm Coleman's chief of staff, Erich Mische, denied that Coleman's staffers had edited his page "to correct inaccuracies and delete information". Mische stated: "What's to stop someone from writing in that Norm Coleman was 7 feet 10 inches, with green hair and one eye smack dab in the middle of his head? That's about as silly as this gets [...] When you put 'edia' in there, it makes it sound as if this is a benign, objective piece of information." Wikipedia co-founder Jimmy Wales said, "It appears to be a major rewrite of the article to make it more favorable."

=== Joe Biden ===
The Wikipedia investigation found that Biden staffers had removed and modified descriptions of incidents of alleged plagiarism and had recast discussion of a possible Biden 2008 presidential candidacy in a more favorable light. In February 2006, The Washington Post quoted Biden spokesperson Norm Kurz as saying that the changes that were "made to Biden's site by this office were designed to make it more fair and accurate."

=== Gil Gutknecht ===
On August 16, 2006, the Minneapolis-St. Paul Star Tribune reported that the office of Representative Gil Gutknecht tried twice—on July 24 and August 14, 2006—to remove a 128-word section in the Wikipedia article on him, replacing it with a more flattering 315-word entry from his official congressional biography. Gutknecht's office used the account "Gutknecht01" for the first edits on July 24, which was then notified of Wikipedia policies against self-editing. For the second set of edits on August 16, his office used an anonymous Congressional IP address.

Most of the removed text was about a 12-year term limit Gutknecht imposed on himself in 1995. Gutknecht's re-election bid in 2006 would have broken this promise if it had been successful. Gutknecht was ultimately defeated in the election by Tim Walz. A spokesman for Gutknecht did not dispute that his office had tried to change his Wikipedia entry, but questioned the reliability of the encyclopedia.

=== David Davis and Matthew Hill ===
In August 2007, US Representative David Davis's press secretary Timothy Hill at first denied—and later acknowledged, during a second press interview with the Knoxville News Sentinel—that he had used a congressional office computer and resources to edit Wikipedia in June 2007. His edits were to delete blocks of information about his employer and his brother Tennessee Representative Matthew Hill from their respective Wikipedia biographies. The information that was deleted "concerned political contributions to both his brother and Davis by former King Pharmaceuticals CEO John Gregory, as well as other ties to the Gregory family."

=== Mike Pence ===
In August 2011, The Huffington Post reported that an account claiming to be from the office of then-Indiana Representative Mike Pence edited Pence's Wikipedia page, noting that the account added past accomplishments and positive descriptions of the gubernatorial candidate as well as removing vandalism.

=== Edward Snowden ===
On August 2, 2013, an editor using an IP address linked to the US Senate edited the Wikipedia page of whistleblower Edward Snowden to change his description from "dissident" to "traitor". On August 5, 2014, an editor using an IP address linked to the US House of Representatives edited the Wikipedia page of the United Nations High Commissioner for Human Rights, Navi Pillay, to describe Edward Snowden as an "American traitor".

=== Laverne Cox ===
On August 21, 2014, an editor using an IP address linked to the US House of Representatives edited the page on the Netflix original series Orange Is the New Black to describe actress Laverne Cox as a "real man pretending to be a woman".

=== Senate Intelligence Committee report on CIA torture ===
On December 9 and 10, 2014, an anonymous user using an IP address registered to the US Senate (156.33.241.11) edited the article on the Senate Intelligence Committee report on CIA torture, removing a sentence characterizing the CIA's "enhanced interrogation techniques" as "torture".

=== Kavanaugh hearings ===
In September 2018, an anonymous editor from Congress posted the personal information of several Republican senators in their articles, leading to CongressEdits, a bot which posts edits to Wikipedia from IP addresses located in Congressional offices, being banned from Twitter. A former Democratic staffer named Jackson Cosko was arrested and eventually convicted for the doxxing; he had worked as a systems administrator for senator Maggie Hassan (D-NH) and had been fired before the incident, used a colleague's key to sneak into the office, install keylogging software, and collect the personal information on senators. He was arrested, charged with 7 crimes, and eventually convicted in the court case United States of America v. Jackson A. Cosko. Cosko was sentenced to four years in prison. On September 27, the disambiguation page for "Devil's Triangle" was edited from a House of Representatives IP address to describe it as a drinking game, matching the testimony of Kavanaugh.

== Congressional edits ==
The Wikimedia system has responded in at least three ways to questionable edits. The most obvious response is case-by-case, based on the "watch" button at the top of each article: A user who sets that switch can get emails when that article is changed. Another is an occasional (usually temporary) block. At least some of these are documented in Wikipedia. For edits from IP addresses associated with the US Congress, Ed Summers also created a Twitter feed to notify the world of any changes made from those addresses. @congressedits was an automated Twitter account from 2014 to 2018 that tweeted anonymous changes to Wikipedia articles that originated from IP addresses belonging to the United States Congress. Prior to the Twitter feed, the best information about what congressional staffers were editing was found in the present article on US Congressional staff edits to Wikipedia and in the Wikipedia project page for congressional staffer edits, both of which are manually updated. The changes were presumed to have been made by the staffs of US elected representatives and senators.

== Proponents ==
In August 2014, the Cato Institute suggested that Congressional staffers should spend spare time editing Wikipedia. A panel hosted by the institute endorsed the idea so that congressional staffers could use their time to write neutral and informative articles about proposed legislation to better educate the public. Experts on the panel considered the two main obstacles to doing this as being skepticism towards Wikipedia and the history of biased editing from Congressional staffers. The Cato Institute suggested one way to overcome these issues would be for the staffers to create user accounts and user profile pages disclosing their connections with Congress.

== See also ==
- Conflict-of-interest editing on Wikipedia
- List of political editing incidents on Wikipedia
- Wikipedia coverage of American politics
- Wikipedia:Congressional staffer edits
