= List of political editing incidents on Wikipedia =

The following is a list of publicly known incidents that occurred on Wikipedia when people with an external relationship to a political subject added information, promotional material, or maintained a particular context, with the aim of advancing a political ideology, viewpoint, or state position.

Such practices, comprising political editing, can be seen as a type of conflict-of-interest editing. The Wikipedia community utilizes various tools and policies to detect and remove such content; whether they would be effective against a state actor has been called into question.

== Incidents ==
=== WikiScanner ===
In 2007, Virgil Griffith created a searchable database that linked changes made by anonymous Wikipedia editors to companies and organizations from which the changes were made. The database cross-referenced logs of Wikipedia edits with publicly available records about the internet IP addresses edits were made from.

Most of the edits WikiScanner found were minor or harmless, but further analysis detected more controversial and embarrassing instances of conflict of interest edits. These instances received media coverage worldwide. Included among the accused were the Vatican, the CIA, the Federal Bureau of Investigation, the US Democratic Party's Congressional Campaign Committee, the US Republican Party, Britain's Labour Party, Britain's Conservative Party, the Canadian government, Industry Canada, the Department of Prime Minister, Cabinet, Defence in Australia, the United Nations, the US Senate, the US Department of Homeland Security, the US Environmental Protection Agency, Montana Senator Conrad Burns, Ohio Governor Bob Taft, the Israeli government, and various media and industry organizations.

Although the edits correlated with known IP addresses, there was no proof that the changes came from a member of the organization or an employee of the company, only that someone had access to their network.

=== Israeli–Palestinian conflict ===
In 2008, the pro-Israel activist group Committee for Accuracy in Middle East Reporting in America (CAMERA) launched a campaign to alter Wikipedia articles to support the Israeli side of the Israeli–Palestinian conflict. The campaign suggested that pro-Israeli editors should pretend to be interested in other topics until elected as administrators. Once administrators they were to misuse their administrative powers to suppress pro-Palestinian editors and support pro-Israeli editors. Some participants in the project were banned by Wikipedia administrators.

In 2010, two pro-settler Israeli groups, Yesha Council and Israel Sheli, launched courses to instruct pro-Israel editors on how to use Wikipedia to promote Israel's point of view. A prize was to be given to the editor who inserted the most pro-Israel changes.

The organization National Vision, led by Likud politician Ariel Kallner, was supported by the Israeli government through Concert, founded in 2018, to introduce a government-friendly perspective into the English Wikipedia (and to produce Russian advocacy videos).

In 2023, the right-wing Israeli non-profit think tank Kohelet Policy Forum came under criticism for allegedly using five sock puppet accounts to skew its Wikipedia page, which it has claimed was done by an employee without the consent or knowledge of KPF. KPF has openly used paid editing in the past to write about the 2023 Israeli judicial reform and other issues aligned with its viewpoints, mainly on the Hebrew Wikipedia. These five sockpuppet accounts were blocked between 17:45 and 18:54 on July 12, 2023 (UTC) in Hebrew Wikipedia. The forum, which already operates six authorized accounts, distanced itself from the sock puppets, claiming their operation was unauthorized and contravened the community's rules and forum's own policies.

=== Pro-China editing ===
In October 2019, the BBC reported that there were indications that tendentious edits on 22 politically sensitive articles (such as those related to the 2019–2020 Hong Kong protests or Taiwan) were not all "necessarily organic, nor random". The BBC quoted an academic article published in the Journal of Social Sciences called Opportunities And Challenges Of China's Foreign Communication in the Wikipedia as saying "due to the influence by foreign media, Wikipedia entries have a large number of prejudiced words against the Chinese government" and continues "We must develop a targeted external communication strategy, which includes not only rebuilding a set of external communication discourse systems, but also cultivating influential editors on the wiki platform." before concluding "China urgently needs to encourage and train Chinese netizens to become Wikipedia platform opinion leaders and administrators… [who] can adhere to socialist values and form some core editorial teams." Not all edits made by Chinese state actors are vandalism; many are related to asserting one disputed claim over others or pruning language to make a political point. The BBC reported that attacks have been made not just against Wikipedia's content but also against individual editors.

On 13 September 2021, the Wikimedia Foundation globally banned seven editors belonging to the Chinese Wikipedia group "Wikimedians of Mainland China", and removed the administrative privileges of another twelve, due to a "security risk related to information about infiltration of Wikimedia systems, including positions with access to personally identifiable information and elected bodies of influence". Researchers have called the incident "the clearest indication of a more concerted and strategic attempt to change Wikipedia by a state".

=== Promotion or debasement of politicians and political candidates ===
==== United States Congressional staffers ====
In 2006, it was discovered that more than 1,000 changes had been made to Wikipedia articles originating from United States government IP addresses. Changes had been made to articles about Representative Marty Meehan, Senator Tom Coburn, Senator Norm Coleman, Representative Gil Gutknecht, then-Senator Joe Biden, Senator Conrad Burns, Senator Dianne Feinstein, Senator Tom Harkin, Representative David Davis, Tennessee state representative Matthew Hill and then-Representative Mike Pence. The edits removed accurate but critical information and embellished positive descriptions. In response to the controversy, certain affected IP addresses were temporarily blocked.

Later, in 2011, conflicted edits were also made to US Congressional representative David Rivera's article.

==== 2008 US presidential campaign ====
During the 2008 US presidential election, changes made by both Barack Obama's and John McCain's campaigns made news. A user who later claimed to work for the McCain campaign made changes to Sarah Palin's article just before the announcement that she would run for vice-president.

==== 2012 Newt Gingrich presidential campaign ====
Around the beginning of 2012, Joe DeSantis, the campaign communications director for American presidential candidate Newt Gingrich, argued for and made changes to Gingrich's Wikipedia article. Some changes which DeSantis requested were minor, but his initial efforts tried to remove negative details which he thought unduly biased the articles, including details about Gingrich's extramarital affairs, information about his financial expenditure, ethics charges against him, and his political positions on controversial issues.

The incident was notable for DeSantis' switch from editing articles about the politician and his wife directly, to following Wikipedia's conflict of interest guideline by using the linked discussion pages for each article to suggest edits rather than make them himself. He said, "I stopped making direct edits in May 2011 because I was alerted to the COI rules...Earlier I thought that simply disclosing my affiliation was enough but it wasn't. So I started posting requests on the Talk page. This has been far more successful and the other editors on Wikipedia have largely received this very positively." He told the political journalism organization Politico that his approach of working with the Wikipedia community by discussing edits on talk pages to be more successful than making the changes himself. Wikipedia editor Tvoz was quoted as critical of the practice; she wrote: "... I have to say this micro-managing by a Gingrich campaign director is a matter of concern to me even though you now are identifying yourself. Pointing out factual errors is one thing, but your input should not go beyond that, even [on a Talk page]."

==== United Kingdom Parliament ====
In March 2012, the Bureau of Investigative Journalism uncovered that UK MPs or their staff had made almost 10,000 edits to the encyclopedia and that almost one in six MPs had their Wikipedia articles edited from within Parliament. Many of the changes dealt with removing unflattering details from during the 2009 expenses scandal, as well as other controversial issues. Former MP Joan Ryan admitted to changing her entry "whenever there's misleading or untruthful information [that has] been placed on it." Clare Short said her staff were "angry and protective" over mistakes and criticisms in her Wikipedia article and acknowledged they might have made changes to it. Labour MP Fabian Hamilton also reported having one of his assistants edit a page to make it more accurate, in his view. MP Philip Davies denied making changes about removing controversial comments related to Muslims from 2006 and 2007.

Labour MP Chuka Umunna was alleged to have created and edited his own Wikipedia page. Umunna told the Daily Telegraph that he did not alter his own Wikipedia page, but the paper quoted what they called "sources close to Umunna" as having told the newspaper that "it was possible that one of his campaign team in 2007, when he was trying to be selected to be Labour's candidate for Streatham in the 2010 general election, set up the page."

==== Irish former senator Jim Walsh ====
In September 2015, former senator Jim Walsh admitted to editing his own Wikipedia entry, claiming it had been edited by "a person from the gay lobby groups". He said that he had removed "certain erroneous comments" but did not say which edits he made. T.J. McIntyre, a law lecturer at University College Dublin, drew attention to edits made from an IP address belonging to the Oireachtas. Edits made from that address included removal of controversial comments made by the former senator about gay people or the Marriage Equality referendum.

==== Saudi infiltration ====
On 6 December 2022, the Wikimedia Foundation announced that it had globally banned 16 users — including seven administrators of Arabic Wikipedia as well as several ordinary users of Arabic Wikipedia and Persian Wikipedia — for conflict-of-interest editing of Middle East and North Africa topics. Democracy for the Arab World Now (DAWN) alleged these users to have been agents of the Saudi Arabian government; the organization also drew attention to the case of two administrators of Arabic Wikipedia from Saudi Arabia, — Osama Khalid and Ziyad al-Sofiani — who had been arrested in 2020, and allegedly sentenced to imprisonment on charges including but not limited to their editing of Wikipedia. The Foundation rejected DAWN's allegations about Saudi infiltration but did not comment on the incarceration of two administrators, and refused to confirm the specifics of the ban.

==== Iranian infiltration ====
In September 2018, a gathering titled "Exploring the Utilization of Wikipedia Strategies in Communication" took place in Tehran. The event was hosted at the Ministry of Culture and Islamic Guidance and consisted of a meeting between Iran's Ministry of Culture and chief editors of the Persian Wikipedia. During this meeting, discussions revolved around incorporating the Persian Wikipedia as a non-governmental organization within the oversight of Iran's Ministry of Culture. Another point of discussion was the protection of Wikipedia pages of Iranian officials from what Hamid Ziaei Parvar (the then deputy minister of Iran's Ministry of Culture and Islamic Guidance) referred to as "attacks and campaigns." An article featured in Open Democracy concluded that there were risks in the collaboration between the Iranian state and the Persian Wikipedia, mainly involving the empowering of the Iranian government to adopt complex forms of censorship within its propaganda apparatus.

An article published in The Times in January 2024 said that "anonymous users" change content in the English-language Wikipedia to "downgrade Iranian human right atrocities" and "discredit Iranian dissident groups". An op-ed by Majid Rafizadeh also said that Iranian state propaganda articles are used as sources to "shape narratives" in the English-language Wikipedia. Rafizadeh said that certain content that is critical of the Iranian government is also being censored in the platform.

==== Other examples ====
In 2011, Sarah Palin commented on the history of Paul Revere. This led to Palin supporters attempting to change the Wikipedia article about him to match Palin's comments.

In October 2012, the Occupy Melbourne article was edited from a City of Melbourne IP address to alter language about recent protests, in the week leading up to the election of lord mayor Robert Doyle. Doyle denied any involvement or motive.

In May 2019, LNP reported on paid conflict-of-interest editing concerning several Pennsylvania politicians.

In December 2019, Slate and other media reported on likely conflict-of-interest editing of US presidential candidate Pete Buttigieg's article.

In December 2020, Politico reported on conflict-of-interest editing regarding Jeffrey Zients by the Democratic consulting firm Saguaro Strategies.

In November 2022, Politico reported that New York congressman George Santos had edited his own Wikipedia article on at least one now-blocked Wikipedia account. In July 2023, The Daily Beast reported that fellow New York congressman Mike Lawler had edited his own Wikipedia page on several occasions.

In May 2023, shortly before announcing his candidacy for president, U.S. presidential candidate Vivek Ramaswamy paid a Wikipedia editor to remove information on his Wikipedia page, allegedly to appeal more to conservatives. Vivek's intention was to obscure his history of being a participant in the Ohio COVID-19 Response Team and his post-graduate fellowship from Paul & Daisy Soros Fellowship for New Americans. Ramaswamy denied manipulation and instead insisted that he was just paying to edit "factual distortions".

In August 2026, PassBlue reported on the recent editing on the candidates in the 2026 United Nations Secretary-General selection.

== See also ==
- List of Wikipedia controversies
- Criticism of Wikipedia
- Ideological bias on Wikipedia
- Reliability of Wikipedia
- Vandalism on Wikipedia
- Wikipedia bots
- Wikipedia coverage of American politics
- Media manipulation
- State-sponsored Internet propaganda
