= Raymond Finney =

American politician (1941–2026)

Member of the Tennessee Senate from the 8th district
- In office January 11, 2005 – January 13, 2009
- Preceded by: Bill Clabough
- Succeeded by: Doug Overbey

Personal details
- Born: March 29, 1941 Knoxville, Tennessee, U.S.
- Died: March 15, 2026 (aged 84) Maryville, Tennessee, U.S.
- Party: Republican
- Spouse: Linda Hunley
- Children: 4
- Education: University of Tennessee (BS); University of Tennessee College of Medicine (MD)
- Website: Senate website

Raymond Alfred Finney Jr. (March 29, 1941 – March 15, 2026) was an American politician who was a Republican member of the Tennessee Senate, representing the 8th district, which encompasses Blount and Sevier counties.

In the 104th Tennessee General Assembly, he was Assistant Floor Leader for the Senate Republican Caucus, as well as Vice-Chair of Senate Government Operations, and he served on the Senate Environment, Conservation and Tourism Committee and the Senate General Welfare, Health and Human Resources Committee. In the 105th General Assembly, he served as the Chair of the Calendar Committee, the Chair of Select Oversight Committee on TennCare, Secretary of the General Welfare, Health and Human Resources Committee and was a member of the Environment, Conservation and Tourism Committee and the Finance, Ways and Means Committee.

== Background ==
Finney was born on March 29, 1941. He graduated from the University of Tennessee in Knoxville with a B.S., and in 1964 he received an M.D. from the University of Tennessee College of Medicine in Memphis. For one year he worked as a surgical intern in Memphis hospitals, and for four years he worked as an anatomic and clinical pathology resident at The University of Tennessee Medical Center in Knoxville.

He previously worked at the United States Public Health Service. Finney retired in 1999 from practice as a pathologist and laboratory director at Blount Memorial Hospital in Maryville, Tennessee.

Finney died in Maryville, Tennessee, on March 15, 2026, at the age of 84.

== Creationism in public schools ==
In February 2007, Finney filed a state senate resolution which asked the Tennessee Department of Education to address a number of creationist points. In his resolution, Finney requested that the Department of Education answer three particular questions regarding creationism and the teaching of creationism in public schools. The first question asks:

Is the Universe and all that is within it, including human beings, created through purposeful, intelligent design by a Supreme Being, that is a Creator?

Question two assumes that the answer to the first question is Yes, and then goes on to query:

Since the Universe, including human beings, is created by a Supreme Being (a Creator), why is creationism not taught in Tennessee public schools?

If the answer to the first question is This question cannot be proved or disproved, the resolution then goes on to ask:

Since it cannot be determined whether the Universe, including human beings, is created by a Supreme Being (a Creator), why is creationism not taught as an alternative concept, explanation, or theory, along with the theory of evolution in Tennessee public schools?

Finally, if in the opinion of the Department of Education, the answer to the first question is No, the resolution offers

admiration for being able to decide conclusively a question that has long perplexed and occupied the attention of scientists, philosophers, theologians, educators, and others.

== See also ==
- Matthew Hill
- Tennessee Lt. Governor Ron Ramsey
