= Jason Moore (Wikipedia editor) =

American Wikipedia editor (born 1984 or 1985)

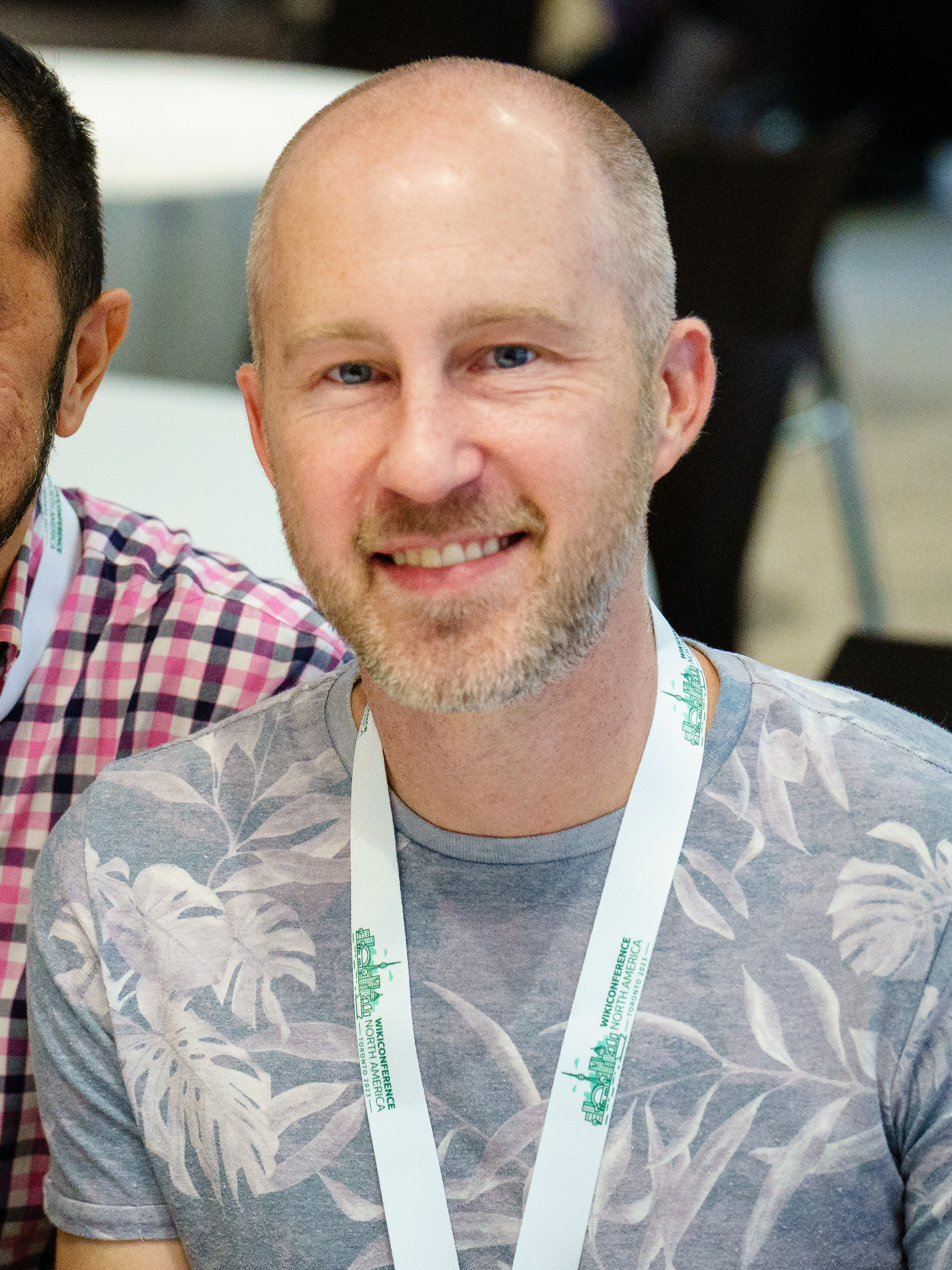
- Moore at the 2023 WikiConference North America
- Born: 1984 or 1985 (age 41–42)
- Known for: Writing and editing for Wikipedia

Jason Moore (born 1984 or 1985) is an American Wikipedia editor among the English Wikipedia's most active contributors by edit count. Editing since 2007 as "Another Believer", he has specialized in current events, with coverage including the COVID-19 pandemic, George Floyd protests, and the culture of Portland, Oregon, where he is based. On Wikipedia, Moore has created and developed editor affinity groups for joint work on these topics. As an organizer in the Wikimedia movement, Moore has hosted meet-ups and edit-a-thons to train new editors.

== Wikipedia ==
Moore is among the most active editors by edit count on the English Wikipedia. Across his half-million edits under the username "Another Believer" since 2007, Moore has created thousands of pages, including articles on current events, natural disasters, and terrorist attacks. Some of these articles include the January 6 United States Capitol attack, the 2022 Buffalo shooting, and the 2022 Laguna Woods shooting. On the English Wikipedia, Moore has created editor affinity groups ("WikiProjects") dedicated to improving Wikipedia's coverage of current events such as the COVID-19 pandemic. During COVID-19, he documented the pandemic's burgeoning reach across multiple U.S. states, business sectors, and communities. He was a major contributor to articles about the protests following the murder of George Floyd. Upon starting the entry on the 2021 United States Capitol attack, he and other editors stewarded the article's influx of new content as the event developed in real time.

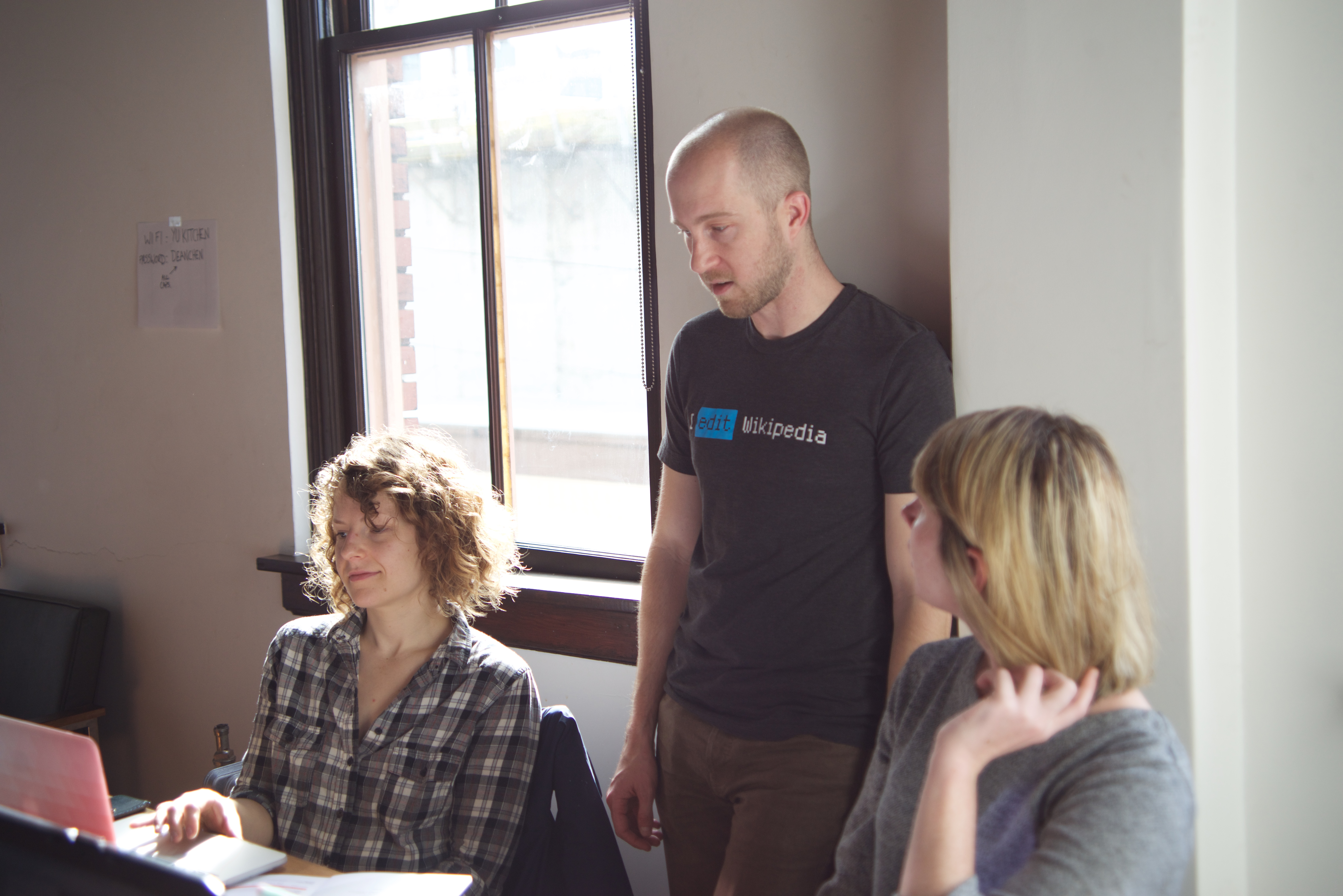
Moore at an Art+Feminism edit-a-thon in Portland, Oregon, 2016

He has additionally written about topics in Portland, Oregon, such as horse rings, roses, the Yale Union Laundry Building, and the 2011 Oregon Symphony recording Music for a Time of War. Moore's first featured article—the encyclopedia's highest quality rating—was about the 2007 album Rufus Does Judy at Carnegie Hall. He has described being motivated by "the instant gratification of making the Internet better so easily" and the satisfaction of "sharing information with the world". CNN Business described Moore as a "Wikipedia influencer".

In addition to editing, Moore has participated in building the Wikimedia movement by organizing local meet-ups and training new editors. A 2013 edit-a-thon he organized at the Portland Art Museum invited people to use institutional resources to improve coverage of local artists, arts organizations, and public art. He continued to host Portland-area events, especially to improve Wikipedia's coverage of Portland arts and women artists. Moore has also helped organize an LGBT-specific outreach affiliate of the Wikimedia Foundation and its Wiki Loves Pride campaign to improve LGBT culture and history-related coverage.

== Personal life and career ==
Moore was born in 1984 or 1985. Raised in Houston, he enjoyed book reports and science projects as a student. He lived in Portland, as of 2022, where he worked as a digital strategist and previously worked in the Oregon Symphony's fundraising department.

== See also ==
- List of people from Houston
- List of people from Portland, Oregon
- List of Wikipedia people
