= Edit count =

Statistics of wiki contributors

On internet wikis (including Wikipedia), an edit count is a record of the number of edits performed by a certain editor, or by all editors on a particular page. An edit, in this context, is an individually recorded change to the content of a page. Within Wikimedia projects, a number of tools exist to determine and compare edit counts, resulting in their usage for various purposes, with both positive and negative effects.

== Use and misuse of edit counts ==
An editor's edit count is often used as a shorthand for determining their level of activity within a wiki, to the extent that it has been said that "one's edit count is a sort of coin of the realm." Tools exist on Wikipedia "to compare contributors by the number of edits they have made," and a Wikipedia editor's edit count "may bring suffrage in elections where only community members may participate." Edit counts are also often weighed in community determinations of whether to grant editors extended rights.

It has been noted, however, that the measure fails to reflect the quality of contributions, with minor improvements and even acts of vandalism potentially registering the same number of edits as substantial additions and improvements of content. Vandalism can similarly increase the edit count associated with a specific article without indicating improvements to the quality of the article. The edit count recorded for a particular article tends to reflect the general level of editor interest in the article, with relatively obscure or unfamiliar topics sustaining low overall edit counts over time. Reader interest, however, is more immediately gauged through pageviews.

At the extreme end, editors who are more focused on increasing their edit count than on improving the quality of work being performed may suffer social consequences due to excessive time invested in making edits. Historically, it has been asserted that some Wikipedia administrators "engage in 'drive-by reversing' so as to drive up their edit count", with such edits sometimes being made too quickly for the editor to have actually read the content being reverted. The development of "an unhealthy obsession with the notion of edit count" has locally been dubbed "editcountitis".

The total edit count for all Wikipedians combined was reported as having reached one billion in mid-January 2021, with the billionth edit being registered by the most prolific non-bot Wikipedia editor, Steven Pruitt, though it was also noted that several hundred thousand early Wikipedia edits were lost in a software upgrade. Notably, some of the highest edit counts in Wikipedia are achieved by bots running automated tasks, rather than by human editors. Among human editors, it has been observed that a small percentage of editors are responsible for a substantial proportion of the total number of edits that have been made.

== Academic studies ==
One of the earliest significant academic studies about Wikipedia was a 2007 peer-reviewed paper, also mentioned in The Guardian, in which a team of six researchers from the University of Minnesota measured the relationship between editors' edit count and the editors' ability to convey their writings to Wikipedia readers, measured in terms of persistent word views (PWV)—the number of times a word introduced by an edit is viewed. The accounting method is best described using the author's own words: "each time an article is viewed, each of its words is also viewed. When a word written by editor X is viewed, he or she is credited with one PWV". The number of times an article was viewed was estimated from the web server logs.

The researchers analyzed 25 trillion PWVs attributable to registered users in the interval September 1, 2002 − October 31, 2006. At the end of this period, the top 10% of editors (by edit count) were credited with 86% of PWVs, the top 1% about 70%, and the top 0.1% (4200 users) were attributed 44% of PWVs, i.e. nearly half of Wikipedia's "value" as measured in this study. The top 10 editors (by PWV) contributed only 2.6% of PWVs, and only three of them were in top 50 by edit count. From the data, the study authors concluded that "[g]rowth of PWV share increases super-exponentially by edit count rank; in other words, elite editors (those who edit the most times) account for more value than they would [be attributed] given a power-law relationship". The study also analyzed the impact of bots on content. By edit count, bots dominate Wikipedia; 9 of the top 10 and 20 of the top 50 are bots. In contrast, in the PWV ranking, only two bots appear in the top 50, and none in the top 10. Based on the steady growth of the influence on those top 0.1% editors by PWV, the study concluded that the editors with the highest edit count "dominate what people see when they visit Wikipedia".

A 2008 study of English Wikipedia editors who had successfully passed the peer review process to become administrators by researchers from Carnegie Mellon University devised a probit model, which found that the number of edits was a factor in the success of such efforts. Edit counts in certain Wikipedia namespaces were more valuable to this end.
