= Wiki Loves Pride =

Wikimedia movement campaign

- Formation: 2014; 12 years ago
- Methods: Edit-a-thons
- Website: Wiki Loves Pride

Wiki Loves Pride is a campaign to improve LGBTQ-related content on Wikipedia and other projects in the Wikimedia movement. Realized in 2014, it grew from the United States and India into events across 18 countries, a dozen of which held in libraries. Edit-a-thons have been commonplace to spur collaboration.

== Description ==
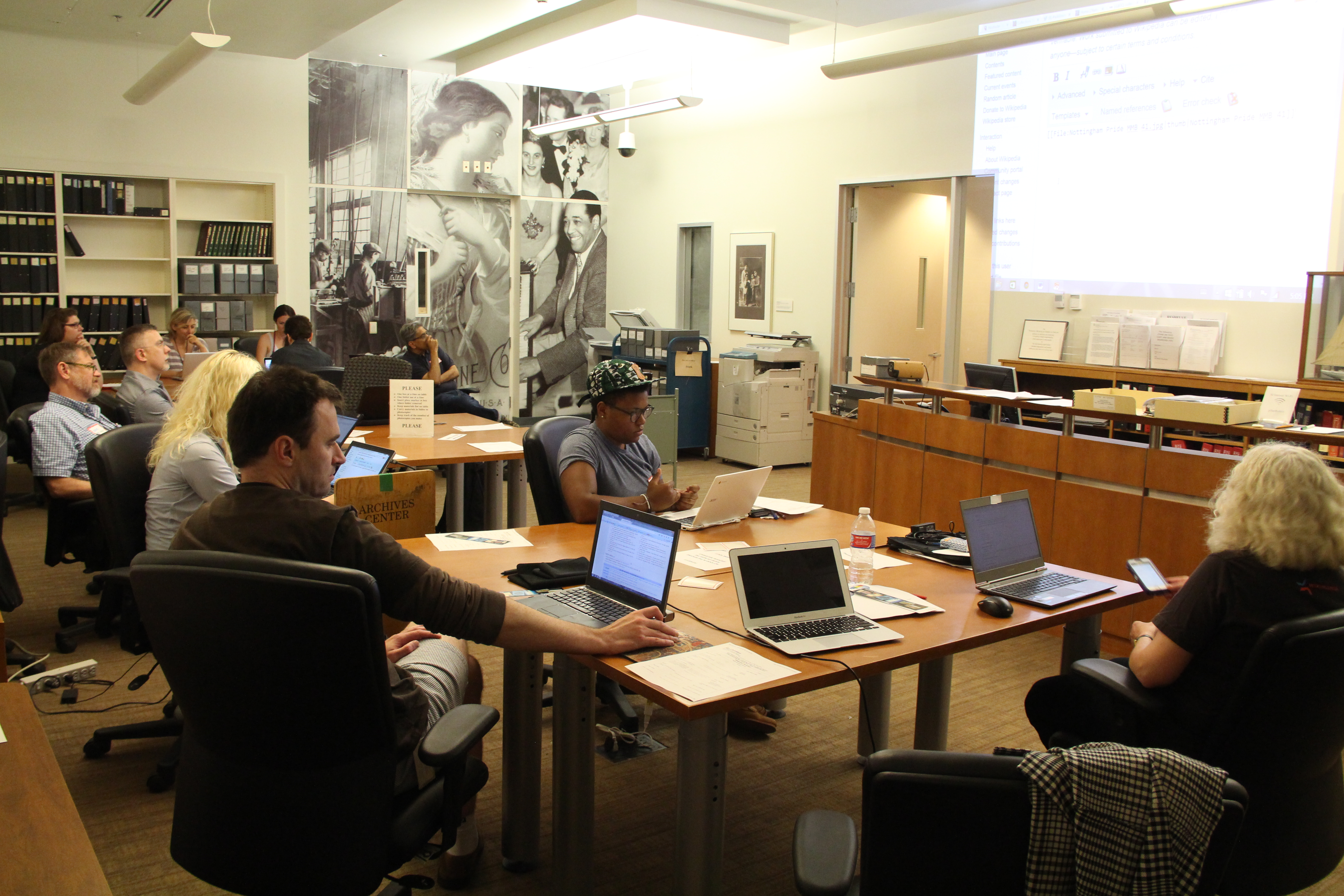
Wiki Loves Pride participants at the National Museum of American History in Washington, D.C., in 2015

The project seeks to create new encyclopedia entries and improve existing coverage of notable LGBTQ events, people, and places, and edit-a-thons have been organized to facilitate collaboration by interested editors. In addition to content creation, participants have worked to translate articles and photograph pride parades and other events. The "celebration of pride" is focused around June and October, "traditionally the months when lesbian, gay, bisexual, and transgender (LGBT) communities around the world celebrate LGBT culture and history".

== History ==
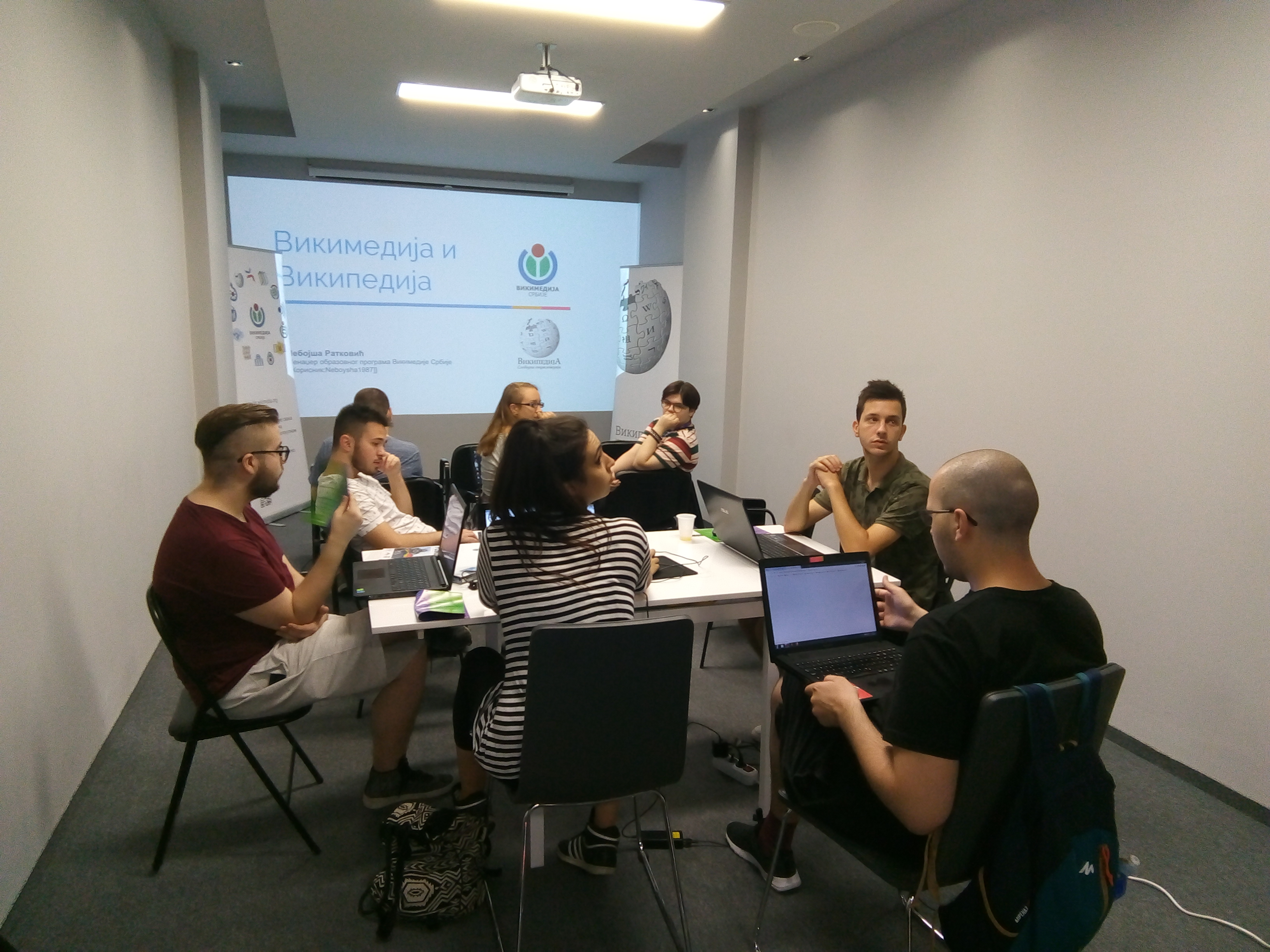
Wiki Loves Pride participants at the Pride Info Center, Belgrade (2018)

Wikipedia editors organized the campaign beginning in 2014 with events registered in at least a dozen cities in the United States as well as Bangalore and New Delhi in India. The founder of the LGBTQ organization Queerala hosted an edit-a-thon in Kochi in 2015, with support from the Wikimedia chapter for India; attendees created more than a dozen new entries for Malayalam Wikipedia. By 2019, 80 events had been organized in 18 countries; a dozen of the Wiki Loves Pride event were hosted at libraries, mostly within the U.S. and including Bucknell University's library and the Minneapolis Central Library. Host librarians "helped to set up the space, locate resources to improve Wikipedia articles, helped with citations, and sometimes just came to edit themselves and mentor newbies".

Events have also been hosted by the Metropolitan Museum of Art, Museum of Modern Art, New York Public Library, and Nova Southeastern University.

In 2024, the Spanish Wikipedia editorial community organized the Wikipedia Pride Month contest for the creation and improvement of articles with LGBTIQA+ content, with prizes for the first three places.

== See also ==
- LGBTQ people and Wikipedia
