= Gil Gutknecht =

American politician (born 1951)

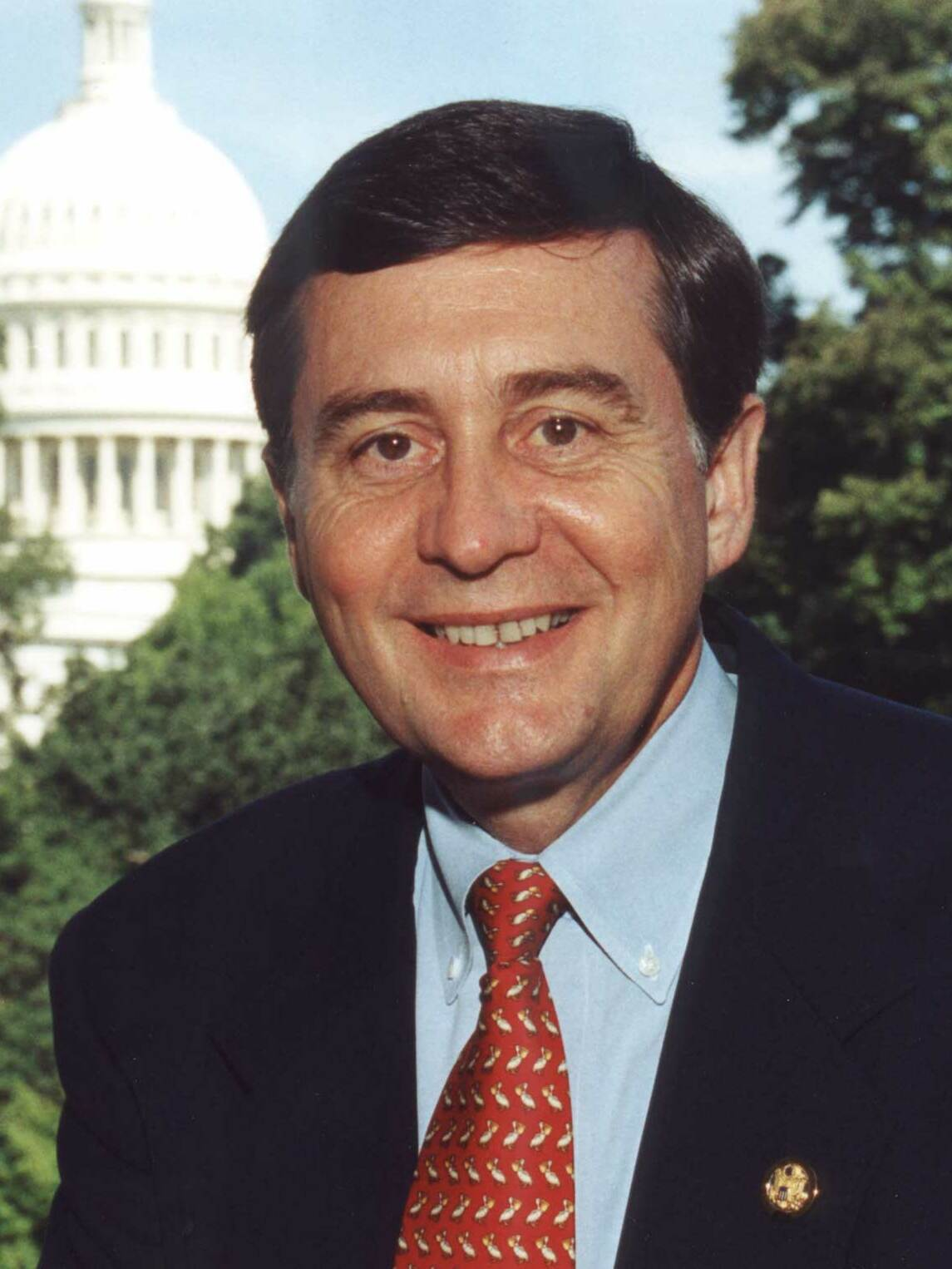

Member of the U.S. House of Representatives from Minnesota's 1st district
- In office January 3, 1995 – January 3, 2007
- Preceded by: Tim Penny
- Succeeded by: Tim Walz

Member of the Minnesota House of Representatives
- In office January 4, 1983 – January 2, 1995
- Preceded by: John R. Kaley
- Succeeded by: Fran Bradley
- Constituency: District 33A (1983–1993); District 30A (1993–1995)

Personal details
- Born: Gilbert William Gutknecht Jr. March 20, 1951 (age 75) Cedar Falls, Iowa, U.S.
- Party: Republican
- Spouse: Mary Keefe
- Education: University of Northern Iowa (BA)

Gilbert William Gutknecht Jr. (/ˈɡuːtˌknɛxt/, born March 20, 1951) is a former American politician. Gutknecht was a Republican member of the United States House of Representatives first elected in 1994 to represent Minnesota's 1st congressional district. Gutknecht lost his 2006 reelection bid to DFL candidate and future Governor Tim Walz, and his term ended in January 2007.

== Background ==
Gutknecht was born in Cedar Falls, Iowa. He graduated from high school in 1969 and was the first member of his extended family to attend college, graduating with a degree in business from the University of Northern Iowa in 1973.

After college, Gutknecht was a school supplies salesman for 10 years. He went to auction college in 1978 and conducted his first real estate auction in 1979.

Gutknecht is married to Mary Catherine Keefe. The couple has three grown children and has lived in Rochester, Minnesota for more than 30 years, where they are members of Pax Christi Catholic Church.

== Career in politics ==
=== Minnesota Legislature ===
In 1983, Gutknecht was elected to the Minnesota House of Representatives, where he served until 1994. He was the Republican floor leader for three years.

=== U.S. House of Representatives ===
Gutknecht was elected to the U.S. House in 1994, running for a seat left open when six-term Representative Tim Penny (DFL) retired. He served six terms, in the 104th, 105th, 106th, 107th, 108th, and 109th congresses, but in the November 2006 election lost his attempt to continue for a seventh.

During his tenure in Congress, Gutknecht served as chair of the House Agriculture Subcommittee on Operations Oversight, Nutrition and Forestry, vice chair of the Science Committee, and as a member of the Government Reform Committee.

In April 1995, The journal Science quoted Gutknecht's legislative aide Brian Harte as saying the federal effort to study AIDS based on the HIV/AIDS link "will be seen as the greatest scandal in American history and will make Watergate look like a no-fault divorce."

In August 2002, Gutknecht voiced his support for expansion plans by the Dakota, Minnesota and Eastern Railroad, despite opposition from many constituents in Mankato and Rochester who were concerned about noise and traffic problems.

He was the only Minnesota Republican to vote against the Central American Free Trade Agreement. He cited the sugar beet growers in his district as one reason to oppose the trade bill, which ultimately passed by a vote of 217–215.

He also sponsored legislation that would have legalized drug imports from other countries, despite opposition from the Food and Drug Administration. It passed the House but the provision fell from the final version, largely based on White House opposition and an administration report critical of imports.

In January 2006, Gutknecht also opposed his party's leadership when he called for new elections for all leadership posts except the speaker. He said Republicans needed to win back the trust of the American people in the wake of the Jack Abramoff scandal.

In mid-2006, after returning from Iraq, Gutknecht said that the U.S. should partially withdraw troops from that country, again deviating from the Republican administration's stance.

Gutknecht was considered to be the third most conservative member of the Minnesota delegation in the 109th Congress, scoring 92% conservative by a conservative group and 7% progressive by a liberal group.

=== Events of 2006 and election defeat ===
Gutknecht ran for re-election in 2006. During the 1994 campaign, he had signed the Contract with America, which called for a Constitutional Amendment to limit congressional terms to 12 years. The "contract" called for a vote on this amendment. "If we ever break this contract, throw us out." In 1995, the Supreme Court ruled in U.S. Term Limits, Inc. v. Thornton that congressional term limit laws are unconstitutional, so a constitutional amendment is the only way to implement term limits. Gutknecht voted for such a proposed amendment in 1995, which failed to muster the two-thirds vote for it to move on to the Senate. After Gutknecht was elected in November 1994, he pledged to serve no more than 12 years. In March 1995 he drafted a bill that would bar House members from accruing additional pension benefits after they have served for six terms. "The purpose is to provide one more incentive for people to stay no longer than 12 years," he said.

In November 1999, Gutknecht said he was not sure he would abide by his past recommendation that legislators serve no more than 12 years. He said he still liked term limits in principle, but he noted that the topic was no longer a front-burner issue in the public mind. According to the Associated Press, he "backtracked" from his 1995 term-limit pledge in May 2004, stating that the voters should be the ones making the decision. In March 2005 he announced he was running for a seventh term.

In March 2006, Gutknecht told a group of Minnesota State University, Mankato College Republicans and other students that the role they would take on in the elections in 2006 would be just as pivotal as the part played by Minnesota's 1st Regiment to hold the line at the Battle of Gettysburg during the American Civil War. "We're asked to stand in that gap and there are big stakes in this election," Gutknecht said. "And remember, had we lost the Battle of Gettysburg, we might have lost the war."

Gutknecht had always chosen to submit filing petitions when running for Congress instead of paying the $300 election filing fee, calling this a more fiscally conservative approach. Gutknecht was the only major party candidate in Minnesota to submit filing petitions in 2006. In August 2006, Louis Reiter of Elgin, Minnesota filed papers with the Minnesota Supreme Court seeking to disqualify Gutknecht from having his name appear on the September 12, 2006 primary ballot. The filing was prepared by DFL election attorney Alan Weinblatt, and argued that all candidates are subject to a time limit for petitions, and that most of the petition signatures were gathered before the July 4–18, 2006 period which the lawsuit claimed was applicable. Gutknecht filed the petitions on July 5, 2006, the first day possible for such filings. He had never previously been challenged on this point. The state Supreme Court heard the case on August 22, 2006, and denied the attempt to disqualify Gutknecht the same day.

On August 17, 2006, WCCO-TV News in Minneapolis reported that members of Gutknecht's campaign made edits to his Wikipedia article. They replaced part of the page with his official congressional biography, removing references to his term-limit pledges. Gutknecht's office used the account "Gutknecht01" to attempt previous edits on July 24; that account was then notified (via its talk page) of Wikipedia policies against self-editing.

Gutknecht defeated Gregory Mikkelson in the Republican primary on September 12, 2006, 87%–13%. Gutknecht was unsuccessful in his bid for a seventh term, losing to DFLer Tim Walz. After the election, Gutknecht was asked about a possible return to politics. He replied "That's a little like asking a woman who's just come out of a 38-hour labor and delivered a 12-pound [5.4 kg] baby, 'Well, don't you want to get pregnant again?' Not today."

== Electoral history ==
- 1996 Race for U.S. House of Representatives – 1st District
  - Gil Gutknecht (R) (inc.), 53%
  - Mary Rieder (DFL), 47%
- 1998 Race for U.S. House of Representatives – 1st District
  - Gil Gutknecht (R) (inc.), 55%
  - Tracy Beckman (DFL), 45%
- 2000 Race for U.S. House of Representatives – 1st District
  - Gil Gutknecht (R) (inc.), 57%
  - Mary Rieder (DFL), 42%
- 2002 Race for U.S. House of Representatives – 1st District
  - Gil Gutknecht (R) (inc.), 61%
  - Steve Andreasen (DFL), 35%
  - Gregg Mikkelson (G), 4%
- 2004 Race for U.S. House of Representatives – 1st District
  - Gil Gutknecht (R) (inc.), 60%
  - Leigh Pomeroy (DFL), 35%
  - Greg Mikkelson (I), 5%
- 2006 Race for U.S. House of Representatives – 1st District
  - Tim Walz (DFL), 53%
  - Gil Gutknecht (R) (inc.), 47%

== See also ==
- Congressional staffer edits to Wikipedia#Gil Gutknecht

U.S. House of Representatives
Preceded by Tim Penny	Member of the U.S. House of Representatives from Minnesota's 1st congressional district 1995–2007	Succeeded by Tim Walz
U.S. order of precedence (ceremonial)
Preceded by Tim Penny as Former U.S. Representative	Order of precedence of the United States as Former U.S. Representative	Succeeded by Keith Ellison as Former U.S. Representative
