= Devil's Triangle (disambiguation) =

Devil's Triangle, or the Bermuda Triangle, is a region in the North Atlantic Ocean.

Devil's Triangle may also refer to:

== Arts and entertainment ==
=== Television ===
- "Devil's Triangle" (NCIS), an episode of the series NCIS
- "Devil's Triangle", an episode of the series MysteryQuest
- "The Devil's Triangle", an episode of the series Curiosity

=== Music ===
- "The Devil's Triangle", a song by King Crimson on the album In the Wake of Poseidon
- "The Devil's Triangle", a song by Dagoba on the album Poseidon
- "Devil's Triangle", a song by Primitive Radio Gods on the album White Hot Peach

=== Other entertainment ===
- The Devil's Triangle, a book by J.T. Ellison and Catherine Coulter
- "The Devil's Triangle", a short story by Melinda M. Snodgrass in the book One-Eyed Jacks
- Hidden Expedition: Devil's Triangle, a video game

== Other uses ==
- Angel's Triangle, El Paso, Texas, US, a neighborhood previously named Devil's Triangle

== See also ==
- Devil's Sea
