= Matthew Hill =

American politician (born 1978)

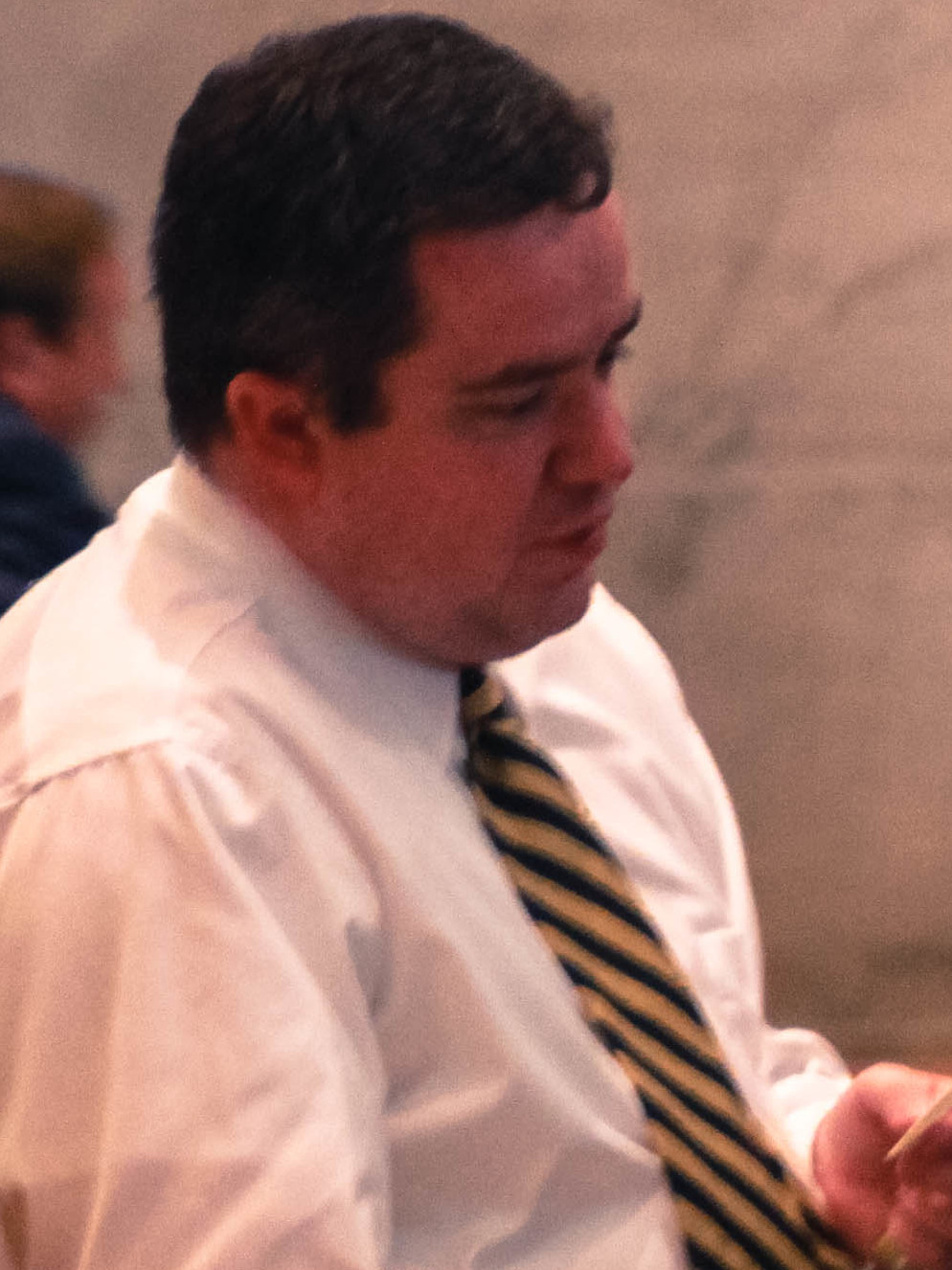

Member of the Tennessee House of Representatives from the 7th district
- In office January 2005 – January 12, 2021
- Preceded by: Bob Patton
- Succeeded by: Rebecca Alexander

Personal details
- Born: Matthew Joseph Hill; December 4, 1978 (age 47) Fort Wayne, Indiana, U.S.
- Party: Republican
- Spouse: Amanda Nadine Jenkins (m. 2003)
- Children: 3
- Education: East Tennessee State University; Mass Communications (B.S. 2003); Northeast State Community College (A.S. 2001)
- Profession: Talk Show Host; Telemarketer; Franchisee; Politician

Matthew Joseph Hill (born December 4, 1978) is an American talk show host, businessman, and politician who served as a member of the Tennessee House of Representatives from 2005 to 2021. Hill briefly served as Deputy Speaker of the Tennessee House of Representatives under appointment by House Speaker Rep. Glen Casada (January 8, 2019, through August 2, 2019).

Hill sought his own selection by the Tennessee House of Representatives as Tennessee House Speaker following both the drawn-out resignation of Speaker Casada amid an unfavorable no-confidence vote by the Tennessee House Republican Caucus and the widely reported news investigations of Casada's own political and personal scandals. Hill subsequently lost his own 2020 Republican Primary bid in the Tennessee 7th House District "by a nearly two to one margin to political newcomer" Rebecca Alexander.

== Early life ==
Hill was born in Fort Wayne, Indiana, the eldest son of Evangelical Methodist Church of America Rev. Dr. Kenneth C. Hill and Janet Hill, and grew up in northeast Tennessee, while attending public, private, and home schools at different times as a student. Hill graduated from Tri-Cities Christian High School and then went on to earn an Associate degree from Northeast State Technical Community College during 2001. Hill later completed a Bachelor of Science degree in Mass Communication from East Tennessee State University.

Hill participated in the April 17, 1999, Bristol protest rally coordinated with International Action Center international protests against the U.S. military intervention during the Kosovo War.

Hill married registered dental hygienist Amanda Nadine Jenkins in 2003.

At the time of his first campaign for the Tennessee General Assembly in 2004, Matthew Hill worked concurrently as operations manager of the Information Communications Corporation, Inc., while hosting "Good Morning Tri-Cities" on WPWT "PowerTalk" 870 AM for seven years Hill is a children's radio show host of the weekday broadcast of the Bible Buddies WHCB Kid’s Show with Mr. Matthew featuring Christian Rock music and had formerly hosted The Matthew Hill Show nationally syndicated broadcast radio program that was also hosted online by the IRN USA Radio News network as a free archived podcast.

His younger brother Timothy is a member of the Tennessee House of Representatives representing the 3rd district.

== Tennessee State Representative ==
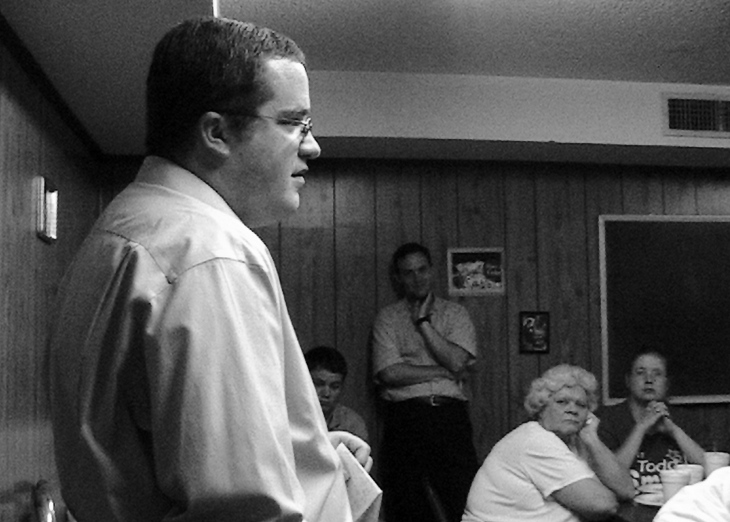
Rep. Matthew Hill speaking during 2008 Republican primary debate, Jonesborough, Tennessee

=== 2004 ===
Hill was first elected to the Tennessee House of Representatives in 2004 as a member of the Republican Party. Hill was then a member of the Children and Family Affairs Committee, the Transportation Committee, the Domestic Relations Subcommittee, and the Public Safety and Rural Roads Subcommittee.

During the 2004 7th House District election, Hill was quoted by a local newspaper as stating that he "would only vote for an income tax if there was a war."

=== 2005 ===
A 2005 article within Business Tennessee Magazine cited Hill as a "...firebrand political conservative," who "...championed social issues to recently get elected to the state House of Representatives representing Johnson City and Washington County."

=== 2006 ===
Hill was first re-elected to the Tennessee House of Representatives in 2006, defeating Fred Phillips, former Washington County Sheriff and Tennessee Department of Safety Director, in the general election.

Among the 2006 legislation sponsored by Hill in the Tennessee General Assembly is HB2921, authorizing (upon passage) "...the display, in county and municipal public buildings..., of replicas of historical documents and writings" including the Ten Commandments religious displays. Former Rep. Jerome Cochran of Carter County introduced HB2921 in the Tennessee House Constitutional Protections subcommittee – of which Hill is not a standing member – and Hill's HB2921 legislation died peacefully in subcommittee.

Another 2006 bill introduced by Hill, HB2924, would make child rape a capital offense, punishable by death or life imprisonment and would cost Tennessee taxpayers over $15 million each year to carry out the proposal. Hill's HB2924 failed in both the House and the Senate during the 2006 legislative session. The Senate version of Hill's child rape bill, SB2490, was sponsored by State Senator Raymond Finney. Finney has stated since the defeat of both HB2924 and SB2490 within the Tennessee General Assembly that he "...does not plan to continue with his bill."

=== 2009 ===
Hill was among a handful of Tennessee General Assembly Members within the House of Representatives widely reported during 2009 as a "Barack Obama "birther" citizenship conspiracy theorist", demanding that U.S President Barack Obama be compelled to present Hill and other legislators with certified copies of Obama's Hawaiian birth certificate. Hill interviewed the nationally noted "birther" conspiracy advocate Orly Taitz at the National Religious Broadcasters Convention in Nashville for a February 10, 2009, segment podcasted online by the IRN USA Radio News network during "The Matthew Hill Show.

=== 2010 ===
The Nashville Scene reported on February 9, 2010, that Hill introduced his HB2683, legislation that "...would transfer all commercial vehicle inspection and enforcement duties from the Safety Department to the Tennessee Regulatory Authority." The Nashville Scene article also observed that as Hill's father is a Tennessee Regulatory Authority Director, Hill's proposed TRA legislation would, "... In addition to all this new revenue from tractor-trailer tickets, the TRA and its directors also would gain fabulous new patronage powers under Hill's bill to fill positions outside of civil service for the next two years."

Hill re-introduced Tennessee workplace legislation during 2010 as HB2685, mandating that employees can only legally speak English at Tennessee workplaces.

=== 2011 ===
During 2011, Hill introduced his HB1705 nullification bill (sponsored in the Tennessee Senate by Senator Stacey Campfield SB1474) that would direct the Tennessee General Assembly to ...appoint a committee to review all federal laws and regulations for constitutionality; requires the committee to submit for a vote of the general assembly all federal laws and regulations it deems to be invalid under the Tennessee or federal constitutions. The U.S. Supreme Court in 1958 (Cooper v. Aaron, 358 U.S. 1) ruled that attempts by state and local officials to nullify federal law amounted to a “war against the Constitution” and cannot be accomplished by an official “without violating his solemn oath to support it.”

=== 2017 ===
In early 2017, Hill and State Senator Bill Ketron garnered national attention by proposing legislation that would free motorists of civil liability for running down political demonstrators.

Hill amended a 2018 bill to strip Memphis of $250,000 after the majority-black city legally circumvented the Tennessee Heritage Protection Act by having opted to sell a parcel of land from a Memphis city park to a non-profit organization that immediately removed the statue of Confederate President Jefferson Davis and statue of Ku Klux Klan Grand Wizard Nathan Bedford Forrest from display on the former city-owned property.

=== 2019 ===
According to the Tennessean the entity Dock Haley Gospel Magic online business Hill and his wife reportedly out of their basement is not registered as a business in Tennessee. Hill did not answer questions about if he has been paying taxes on the business. He stated that "'he has never made a dime' ... 'it's mine and my wife's ministry'". According to the executive director of the state Bureau of Ethics and Campaign Finance, "a lawmaker should be required to disclose the business if it is producing income, even if it is being used to repay the previous business owner. Members of the General Assembly are always required to disclose sources of income over $200".

=== 2020 ===
The Tennessee State Capitol Commission convened on July 9, 2020, and, after consideration of comments made by the public and deliberation among the members, voted for the petition to the Tennessee Historical Commission "for a waiver that would allow for the relocation of the busts of Nathan Bedford Forrest, David Glasgow Farragut and Albert Gleaves from their current locations on the second floor of the Tennessee State Capitol to the Tennessee State Museum". TNGA Senator Jack Johnson (R-Franklin) and Hill, were the only votes against the removal of the Nathan Bedford Forrest bust from the Tennessee General Assembly building.
